= Boxing career of Muhammad Ali =

Muhammad Ali
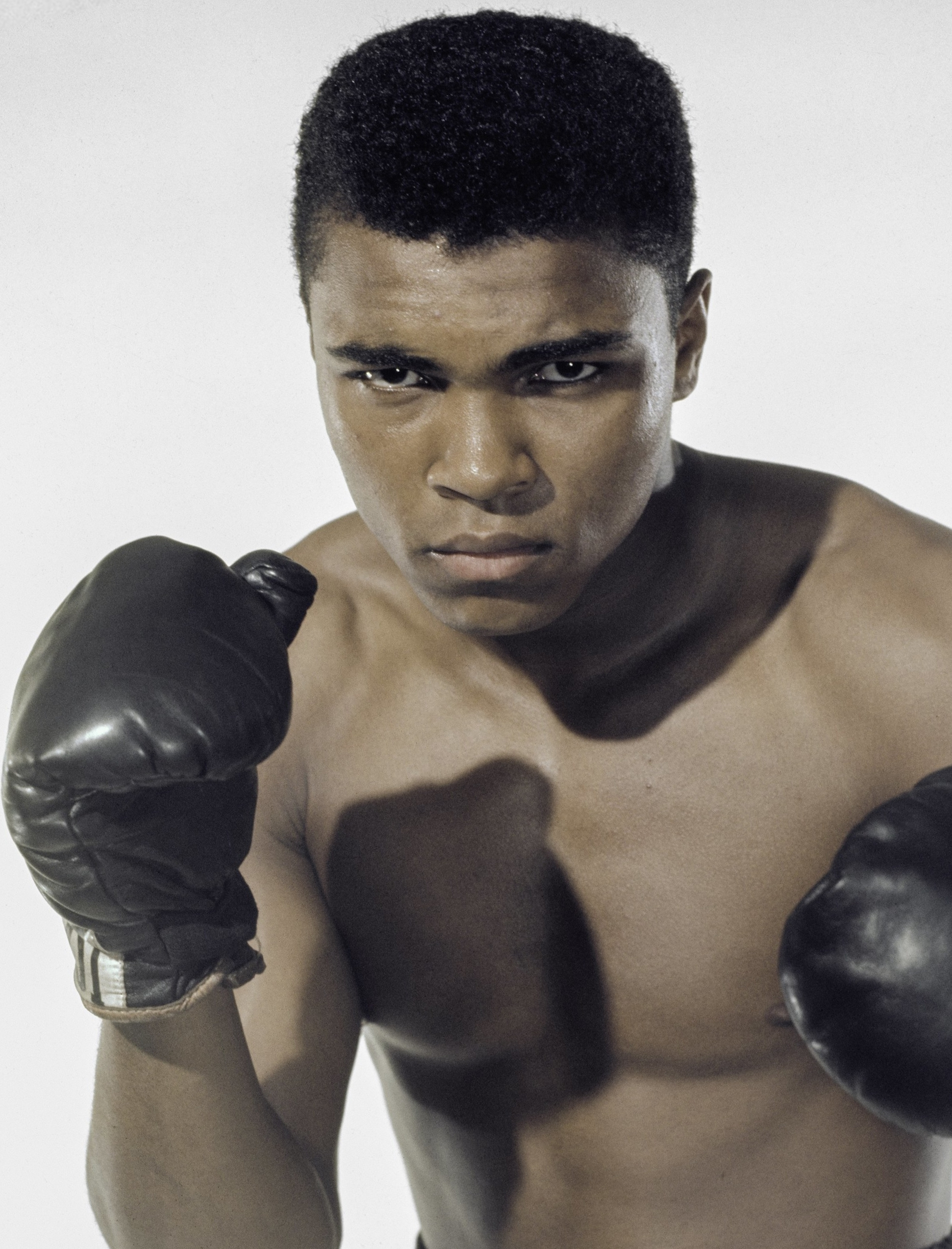
- Ali in 1962

Personal information
- Nicknames: The Greatest; The Louisville Lip; The People's Champion
- Born: Cassius Marcellus Clay Jr. January 17, 1942 Louisville, Kentucky, U.S.
- Died: June 3, 2016 (aged 74) Scottsdale, Arizona, U.S.
- Height: 6 ft 3 in (191 cm)
- Weight: Heavyweight
- Website: muhammadali.com

Boxing career
- Reach: 78 in (198 cm)
- Stance: Orthodox

Boxing record
- Total fights: 61
- Wins: 56
- Win by KO: 37
- Losses: 5
Medal record
Men's amateur boxing
Olympic Games
Representing the United States
Gold medal – first place	1960 Rome	Light-heavyweight
US Olympic Trials
Gold medal – first place	1960 San Francisco	Light-heavyweight
Intercity Golden Gloves
Gold medal – first place	1959 Chicago	Light-heavyweight
Gold medal – first place	1960 New York	Heavyweight
Chicago Golden Gloves
Gold medal – first place	1959 Chicago	Light-heavyweight
Gold medal – first place	1960 Chicago	Light-heavyweight
US National Championships
Gold medal – first place	1959 Toledo	Light-heavyweight
Gold medal – first place	1960 Toledo	Light-heavyweight

Muhammad Ali was an American professional boxer widely regarded by many boxing historians as the greatest heavyweight boxer of all time. The Ring magazine rated him number one in a ranking of greatest heavyweights from all eras in 1998. In 1999, the Associated Press voted Ali the number one heavyweight and second-greatest fighter of the 20th century. That same year, ESPN ranked him third on its list of the Top North American Athletes of the Century, and an ESPN poll named him the greatest pound-for-pound boxer of all time. Ali is the only three-time lineal and undisputed world heavyweight champion. He was inducted into the International Boxing Hall of Fame as part of its inaugural class in 1990.

As an amateur, Ali won the Kentucky Golden Gloves six times, the Chicago Golden Gloves twice, the Intercity Golden Gloves twice, the AAU National Championships twice, and the gold medal in the light heavyweight division at the 1960 Summer Olympics in Rome. In 1964, Ali, listed as an 8-to-1 underdog, defeated reigning World Heavyweight Champion Sonny Liston to win his first world title. After losing to Joe Frazier in the Fight of the Century, he reclaimed his titles by knocking out the previously undefeated George Foreman in the eighth round of The Rumble in the Jungle, despite entering as a 4-to-1 underdog. Following his defeat to Leon Spinks, Ali regained the heavyweight title in their September 15, 1978 rematch, becoming the first boxer to win the championship three times.

Ali received the Boxing Writers Association of America Fighter of the Year award a joint-record three times (1965, 1974, 1975). He was named The Ring magazine Fighter of the Year a record six times (1963, 1966, 1972, 1974, 1975, 1978), and his bouts were recognized as The Ring's Fight of the Year a record six times (1963, 1964, 1971, 1974, 1975, 1978). He also claimed The Ring magazine Round of the Year distinction a record six times (1965, 1971, 1973, 1974, 1975, 1978) and was named the magazine's Fighter of the Decade for the 1960s.

In 1999, Ali was named Sports Illustrated Sportsman of the Century and BBC Sports Personality of the Century. BoxRec ranks him as the tenth greatest boxer of all time, pound-for-pound, and the second-greatest heavyweight.

== Early career ==
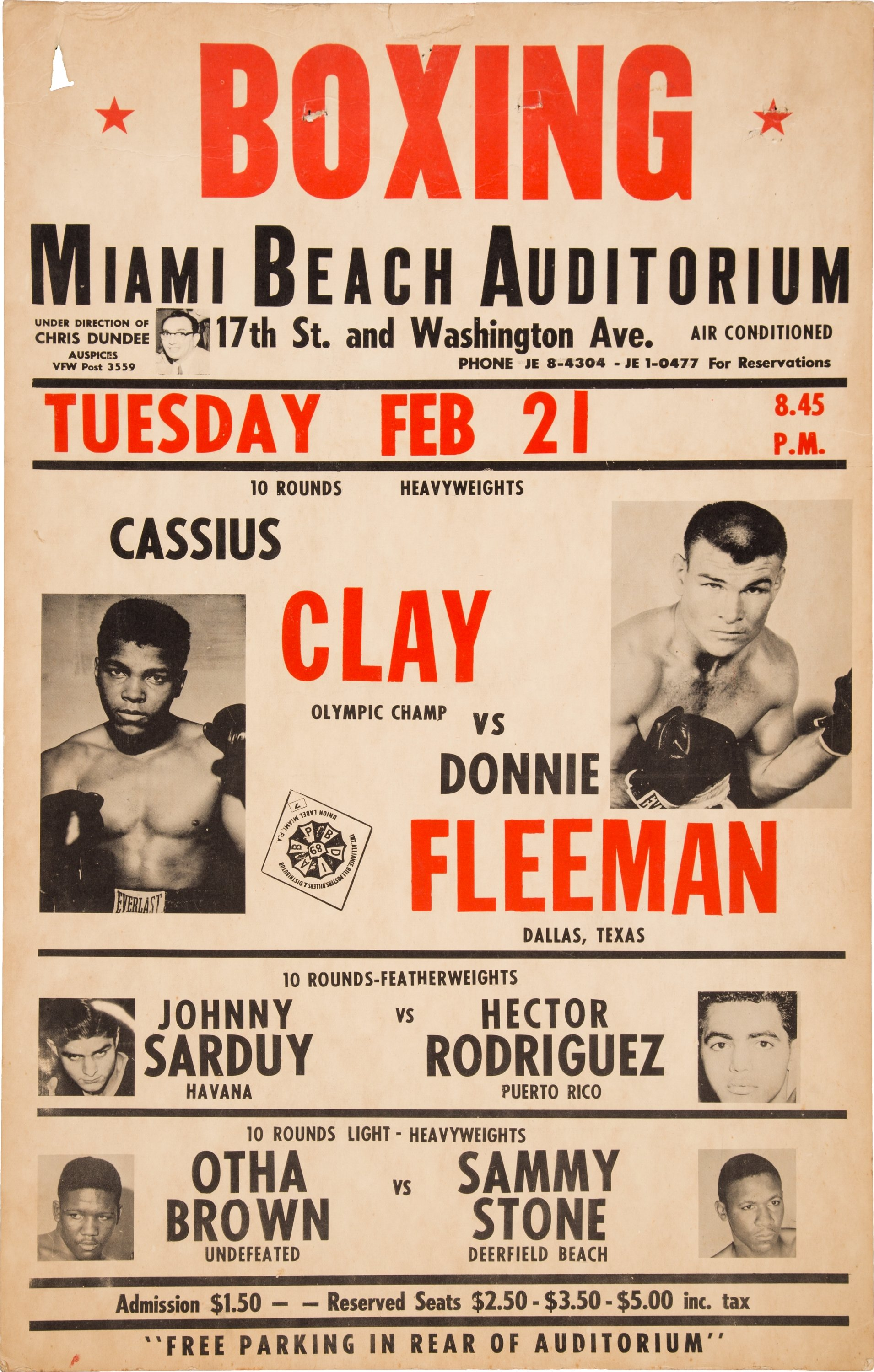
On-site poster for Cassius Clay's fifth professional bout

Clay made his professional debut on October 29, 1960, winning a six-round decision over Tunney Hunsaker. From then until the end of 1963, Clay amassed a record of 19–0 with 15 wins by knockout. He defeated boxers including Tony Esperti, Jim Robinson, Donnie Fleeman, Alonzo Johnson, George Logan, Willi Besmanoff, LaMar Clark, Doug Jones and Henry Cooper. Clay also beat his former trainer and veteran boxer Archie Moore in a 1962 match.

These early fights were not without trials. Clay was knocked down by both Sonny Banks and Cooper. In the Cooper fight, Clay was floored by a left hook at the end of round four, and was groggy when he got up at the count of three. However, the round had ended by the time he rose, and he recovered between rounds, going on to win in the predicted 5th round due to Cooper's severely cut eye. The fight with Doug Jones on March 13, 1963, was Clay's toughest fight during this stretch. The number two and three heavyweight contenders respectively, Clay and Jones fought on Jones' home turf at New York's Madison Square Garden. Jones staggered Clay in the first round, and the unanimous decision for Clay was greeted by boos and a rain of debris thrown into the ring. Watching on closed-circuit TV, heavyweight champ Sonny Liston quipped that if he fought Clay he might get locked up for murder. The fight was later named "Fight of the Year" by The Ring magazine.

In each of these fights, Clay vocally belittled his opponents and vaunted his abilities. He called Jones "an ugly little man" and Cooper a "bum." He said he was embarrassed to get in the ring with Alex Miteff and claimed that Madison Square Garden was "too small for me." His provocative and outlandish behavior in the ring was inspired by professional wrestler "Gorgeous George" Wagner. Ali stated in a 1969 interview with the Associated Press' Hubert Mizel that he met with Gorgeous George in Las Vegas in 1961 and that the wrestler inspired him to use wrestling jargon when he did interviews.

In 1960, Clay left Moore's camp, partially due to his refusal to do chores such as washing dishes and sweeping. To replace Moore, Clay hired Angelo Dundee to be his trainer. Clay had met Dundee in February 1957 during Clay's amateur career. Around this time, Clay sought longtime idol Sugar Ray Robinson to be his manager, but was rebuffed.

== World heavyweight champion ==
=== Fights against Liston ===
By late 1963, Clay had become the top contender for Sonny Liston's title. The fight was set for February 25, 1964, in Miami Beach. Liston was an intimidating personality, a dominating fighter with a criminal past and ties to the mob. Based on Clay's uninspired performance against Jones and Cooper in his previous two fights, and Liston's destruction of former heavyweight champion Floyd Patterson in two first-round knock outs, Clay was an 8:1 underdog. Despite this, Clay taunted Liston during the pre-fight buildup, dubbing him "the big ugly bear", stating "Liston even smells like a bear" and claiming "After I beat him I'm going to donate him to the zoo." Clay turned the pre-fight weigh-in into a circus, shouting at Liston that "someone is going to die at ringside tonight." Clay's pulse rate was measured at 120, more than double his normal 54. Many of those in attendance thought Clay's behavior stemmed from fear, and some commentators wondered if he would show up for the bout.

The outcome of the fight was a major upset. At the opening bell, Liston rushed at Clay, seemingly angry and looking for a quick knockout. However, Clay's superior speed and mobility enabled him to elude Liston, making the champion miss and look awkward. At the end of the first round, Clay opened up his attack and hit Liston repeatedly with jabs. Liston fought better in round two, but at the beginning of the third round Clay hit Liston with a combination that buckled his knees and opened a cut under his left eye. This was the first time Liston had ever been cut. At the end of round four, Clay was returning to his corner when he began experiencing blinding pain in his eyes and asked his trainer, Angelo Dundee, to cut off his gloves. Dundee refused. It has been speculated that the problem was due to ointment used to seal Liston's cuts, perhaps deliberately applied by his corner to his gloves. Though unconfirmed, boxing historian Bert Sugar claimed that two of Liston's opponents also complained about their eyes "burning."

Despite Liston's attempts to knock out a blinded Clay, Clay was able to survive the fifth round until sweat and tears rinsed the irritation from his eyes. In the sixth, Clay dominated, hitting Liston repeatedly. Liston did not answer the bell for the seventh round, and Clay was declared the winner by TKO. Liston stated that the reason he quit was an injured shoulder. Following the win, a triumphant Clay rushed to the edge of the ring and, pointing to the ringside press, shouted: "Eat your words!" He added, "I am the greatest! I shook up the world. I'm the prettiest thing that ever lived."

At ringside post fight, Clay appeared unconvinced that the fight was stopped due to a Liston shoulder injury, saying that the only injury Liston had was "an open eye, a big cut eye!" When told by Joe Louis that the injury was a "left arm thrown out of its socket," Clay quipped, "Yeah, swinging at nothing, who wouldn't!"

In winning this fight at the age of 22, Clay became the youngest boxer to take the title from a reigning heavyweight champion. However, Floyd Patterson remained the youngest to win the heavyweight championship, doing so at the age 21 during an elimination bout following Rocky Marciano's retirement. Mike Tyson broke both records in 1986 when he defeated Trevor Berbick to win the heavyweight title at age 20.

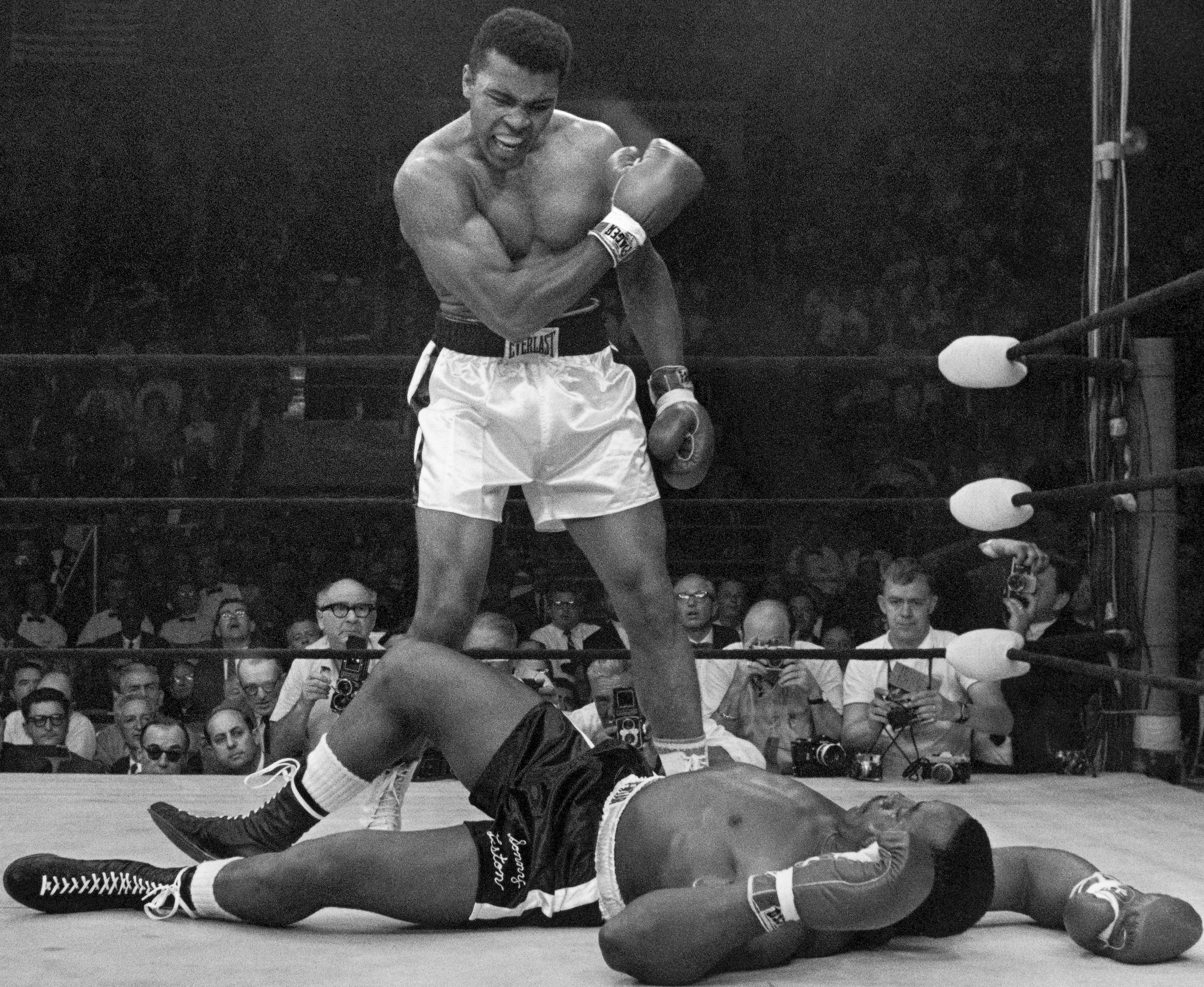
Ali standing over Liston

Soon after the Liston fight, Clay changed his name to Cassius X, and then later to Muhammad Ali upon converting to Islam and affiliating with the Nation of Islam. Ali then faced a rematch with Liston scheduled for May 1965 in Lewiston, Maine. It had been scheduled for Boston the previous November, but was postponed for six months due to Ali's emergency surgery for a hernia three days before. The fight was controversial. Midway through the first round, Liston was knocked down by a difficult-to-see blow the press dubbed a "phantom punch". Referee Jersey Joe Walcott did not begin the count immediately after the knockdown, as Ali refused to retreat to a neutral corner. Liston rose after he had been down for about 20 seconds, and the fight momentarily continued. However a few seconds later Walcott, having been informed by the timekeepers that Liston had been down for a count of 10, stopped the match and declared Ali the winner by knockout. The entire fight lasted less than two minutes.

It has since been speculated that Liston purposely dropped to the ground. Proposed motivations include threats on his life from the Nation of Islam, that he had bet against himself and that he "took a dive" to pay off debts. Slow-motion replays show that Liston was jarred by a chopping right from Ali, although it is unclear whether the blow was a genuine knockout punch.

=== Fight against Patterson ===
Ali defended his title against former heavyweight champion Floyd Patterson on November 22, 1965. Before the match, Ali mocked Patterson, who was widely known to call him by his former name Cassius Clay, as an "Uncle Tom", calling him "The Rabbit". Although Ali clearly had the better of Patterson, who appeared injured during the fight, the match lasted 12 rounds before being called on a technical knockout. Patterson later said he had strained his sacroiliac. Ali was criticized in the sports media for appearing to have toyed with Patterson during the fight. Patterson biographer W.K. Stratton claims that the conflict between Ali and Patterson was not genuine but was staged to increase ticket sales and the closed-circuit viewing audience, with both men complicit in the theatrics. Stratton also cites an interview by Howard Cosell in which Ali explained that rather than toying with Patterson, he refrained from knocking him out after it became apparent Patterson was injured. Patterson himself later said that he'd never been hit by punches as soft as Ali's. Stratton states that Ali arranged the second fight, in 1972, with the financially struggling Patterson to help the former champion earn enough money to pay a debt to the IRS.

=== Main Bout ===
After the Patterson fight, Ali founded his own promotion company, Main Bout, Inc. The company handled Ali's boxing promotions and pay-per-view closed-circuit television broadcasts; its stockholders were mainly fellow Nation of Islam members, such as Jabir Herbert Muhammad and the chief aide to Nation of Islam leader Elijah Muhammad, John Ali, along with several others, including Bob Arum, who later founded Top Rank.

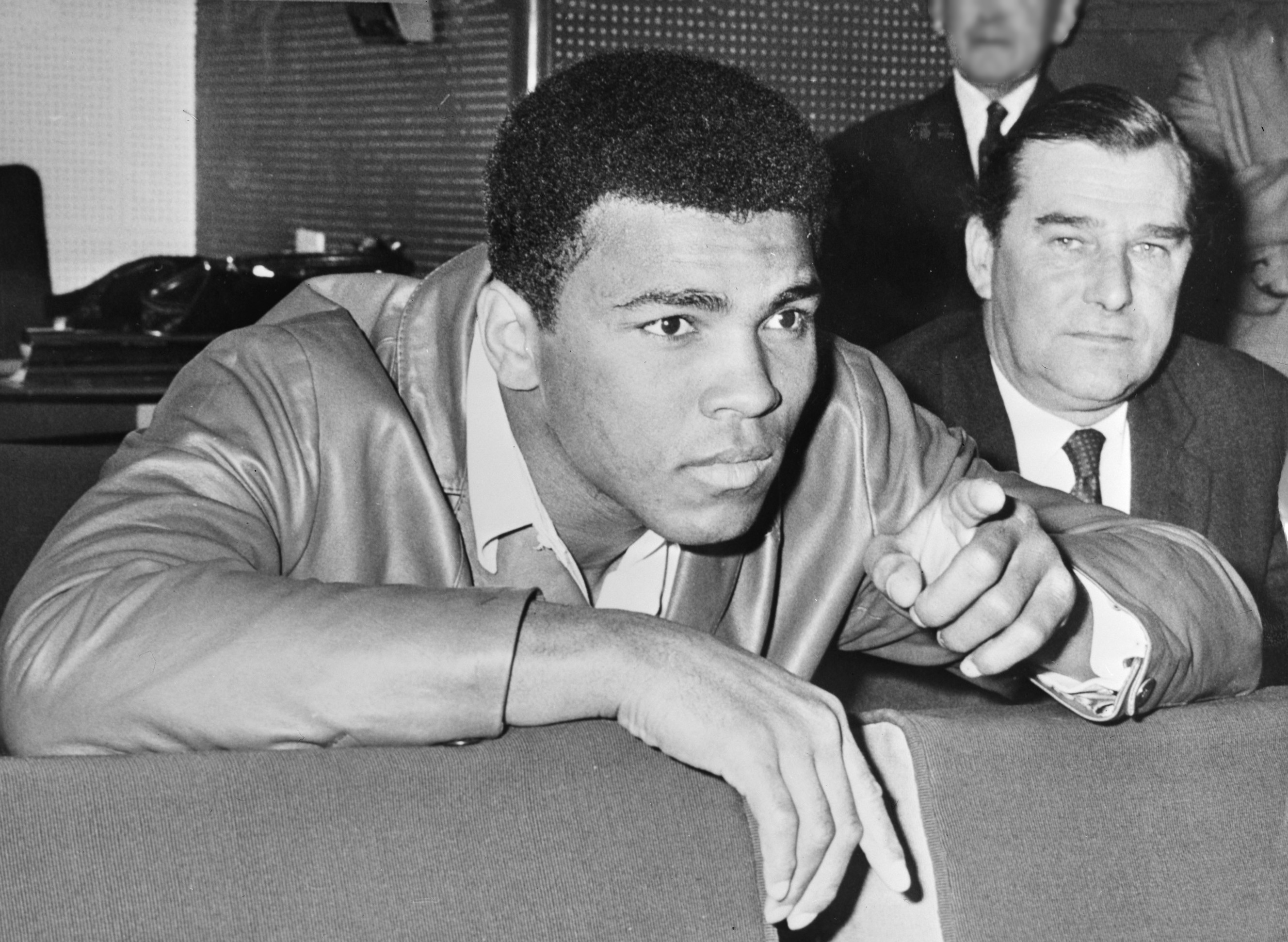
Ali in 1966

Ali and then-WBA heavyweight champion boxer Ernie Terrell had agreed to meet for a bout in Chicago on March 29, 1966 (the WBA, one of two boxing associations, had stripped Ali of his title following his signing a rematch with Liston) but in February Ali was reclassified by the Louisville draft board as 1-A from 1-Y, and he indicated that he would refuse to serve, commenting to the press, "I ain't got nothing against no Viet Cong; no Viet Cong never called me nigger." Amidst the media and public outcry over Ali's stance, the Illinois Athletic Commission refused to sanction the fight, citing technicalities.

Instead, Ali traveled to Canada and Europe and won championship bouts against George Chuvalo, Henry Cooper, Brian London and Karl Mildenberger.

Ali returned to the United States to fight Cleveland Williams in the Houston Astrodome on November 14, 1966. The bout drew a record-breaking indoor crowd of 35,460 people. Williams had once been considered among the hardest punchers in the heavyweight division, but in 1964 he had been shot at point-blank range with a .357 Magnum by a Texas policeman, resulting in the loss of one kidney and 10 feet (3.0 m) of his small intestine. Ali dominated Williams, winning a third-round technical knockout in what some consider the finest performance of his career.

Ali fought Terrell in Houston on February 6, 1967. Terrell, who was unbeaten in five years and had defeated many of the boxers Ali had faced, was billed as Ali's toughest opponent since Liston; he was big, strong and had a three-inch reach advantage over Ali. During the lead up to the bout, Terrell repeatedly called Ali "Clay", much to Ali's annoyance. The two almost came to blows over the name issue in a pre-fight interview with Howard Cosell. Ali seemed intent on humiliating Terrell. "I want to torture him", he said. "A clean knockout is too good for him." The fight was close until the seventh round, when Ali bloodied Terrell and almost knocked him out. In the eighth round, Ali taunted Terrell, hitting him with jabs and shouting between punches, "What's my name, Uncle Tom ... what's my name?" Ali won a unanimous 15-round decision. Terrell claimed that early in the fight Ali deliberately thumbed him in the eye, forcing him to fight half-blind, and then, in a clinch, rubbed the wounded eye against the ropes. Because of Ali's apparent intent to prolong the fight to inflict maximum punishment, critics described the bout as "one of the ugliest boxing fights." Tex Maule later wrote: "It was a wonderful demonstration of boxing skill and a barbarous display of cruelty." Ali denied the accusations of cruelty but, for Ali's critics, the fight provided more evidence of his arrogance.

After Ali's title defense against Zora Folley on March 22, he was stripped of his title due to his refusal to be drafted to army service. His boxing license was also suspended by the state of New York. He was convicted of draft evasion on June 20 and sentenced to five years in prison and a $10,000 fine. He paid a bond and remained free while the verdict was being appealed.

== Exile and comeback ==
In March 1966, Ali refused to be inducted into the armed forces. He was systematically denied a boxing license in every state and stripped of his passport. As a result, he did not fight from March 1967 to October 1970—from ages 25 to 28—as his case worked its way through the appeals process before his conviction was overturned in 1971. During this time of inactivity, as opposition to the Vietnam War began to grow and Ali's stance gained sympathy, he spoke at colleges across the nation, criticizing the Vietnam War and advocating African-American pride and racial justice.

=== The Super Fight ===
While banned from sanctioned bouts, Ali settled a $1 million lawsuit against radio producer Murray Woroner by accepting $10,000 to appear in a privately staged fantasy fight against retired champion Rocky Marciano. In 1969 the boxers were filmed sparring for about 75 one-minute rounds; they acted out several different endings. A computer program purportedly determined the winner, based on data about the fighters. Edited versions of the bout were shown in movie theaters in 1970. In the U.S. version Ali lost in a simulated 13th-round knockout, but in the European version Marciano lost due to cuts, also simulated.

Ali suggested that prejudice determined his defeat in the U.S. version. He was reported to jokingly say, "That computer was made in Alabama."

== Return to prizefighting ==
On August 11, 1970, with his case still in appeal, Ali was granted a license to box by the City of Atlanta Athletic Commission, thanks to State Senator Leroy R. Johnson. Ali's first return bout was against Jerry Quarry on October 26, resulting in a win after three rounds after Quarry was cut.

A month earlier, a victory in federal court forced the New York State Boxing Commission to reinstate Ali's license. He fought Oscar Bonavena at Madison Square Garden in December, an uninspired performance that ended in a dramatic technical knockout of Bonavena in the 15th round. The win left Ali as a top contender against heavyweight champion Joe Frazier.

=== First fight against Joe Frazier ===
Ali and Frazier's first fight, held at the Garden on March 8, 1971, was nicknamed the "Fight of the Century", due to the tremendous excitement surrounding a bout between two undefeated fighters, each with a legitimate claim as heavyweight champions. Veteran boxing writer John Condon called it "the greatest event I've ever worked on in my life." The bout was broadcast to 35 foreign countries; promoters granted 760 press passes.

Adding to the atmosphere were the considerable pre-fight theatrics and name calling. Ali portrayed Frazier as a "dumb tool of the white establishment." "Frazier is too ugly to be champ", Ali said. "Frazier is too dumb to be champ." Ali also frequently called Frazier an "Uncle Tom". Dave Wolf, who worked in Frazier's camp, recalled that, "Ali was saying 'the only people rooting for Joe Frazier are white people in suits, Alabama sheriffs, and members of the Ku Klux Klan. I'm fighting for the little man in the ghetto.' Joe was sitting there, smashing his fist into the palm of his hand, saying, 'What the fuck does he know about the ghetto?'"

Ali began training at a farm near Reading, Pennsylvania, in 1971 and, finding the country setting to his liking, sought to develop a real training camp in the countryside. He found a five-acre site on a Pennsylvania country road in the village of Deer Lake, Pennsylvania. On this site, Ali carved out what was to become his training camp, where he trained for all his fights from 1972 to the end of his career in 1981.

The Monday night fight lived up to its billing. In a preview of their two other fights, a crouching, bobbing and weaving Frazier constantly pressured Ali, getting hit regularly by Ali jabs and combinations, but relentlessly attacking and scoring repeatedly, especially to Ali's body. The fight was even in the early rounds, but Ali was taking more punishment than ever in his career. On several occasions in the early rounds he played to the crowd and shook his head "no" after he was hit. In the later rounds—in what was the first appearance of the "rope-a-dope strategy"—Ali leaned against the ropes and absorbed punishment from Frazier, hoping to tire him. In the 11th round, Frazier connected with a left hook that wobbled Ali, but because it appeared that Ali might be clowning as he staggered backwards across the ring, Frazier hesitated to press his advantage, fearing an Ali counter-attack. In the final round, Frazier knocked Ali down with a vicious left hook, which referee Arthur Mercante Sr. said was as hard as a man can be hit. Ali was back on his feet in three seconds. Nevertheless, Ali lost by unanimous decision, his first professional defeat.

=== Chamberlain challenge and Ellis fight ===
In 1971, basketball star Wilt Chamberlain challenged Ali to a fight, and a bout was scheduled for July 26. Although the seven-foot-two-inch tall Chamberlain had formidable physical advantages over Ali— weighing 60 pounds more and able to reach 14 inches further —Ali was able to influence Chamberlain into calling off the bout by taunting him with calls of "Timber!" and "The tree will fall" during a shared interview. These statements of confidence unsettled his taller opponent, whom Los Angeles Lakers owner Jack Kent Cooke had offered a record-setting contract, conditional on Chamberlain agreeing to abandon what Cooke termed "this boxing foolishness," and he did exactly that. To replace Ali's opponent, promoter Bob Arum quickly booked a former sparring partner of Ali's, Jimmy Ellis, who was a childhood friend from Louisville, Kentucky, to fight him.

=== Fights against Quarry, Bugner, Patterson, Foster and Norton ===
After the loss to Frazier, Ali fought Jerry Quarry, had a second bout with Floyd Patterson and faced Bob Foster in 1972, winning a total of six fights that year. For two fights in 1973 between Joe Bugner and Ken Norton, Ali would wear a "People's Choice" robe which was given to him by Elvis Presley. In 1973, Ken Norton broke Ali's jaw while giving him the second loss of his career. After initially considering retirement, Ali won a controversial decision against Norton in their second bout. This led to a rematch with Joe Frazier at Madison Square Garden on January 28, 1974; Frazier had recently lost his title to George Foreman in 1973.

=== Second fight against Joe Frazier ===
Ali was strong in the early rounds of the fight, and staggered Frazier in the second round. Referee Tony Perez mistakenly thought he heard the bell ending the round and stepped between the two fighters as Ali was pressing his attack, giving Frazier time to recover. However, Frazier came on in the middle rounds, snapping Ali's head in round seven and driving him to the ropes at the end of round eight. The last four rounds saw round-to-round shifts in momentum between the two fighters. Throughout most of the bout, however, Ali was able to circle away from Frazier's dangerous left hook and to tie Frazier up when he was cornered, the latter a tactic that Frazier's camp complained of bitterly. Judges awarded Ali a unanimous decision.

== World heavyweight champion (second reign) ==
=== The Rumble in the Jungle ===
The defeat of Frazier set the stage for a title fight against heavyweight champion George Foreman in Kinshasa, Zaire, on October 30, 1974—a bout nicknamed The Rumble in the Jungle. Foreman was considered one of the hardest punchers in heavyweight history. In assessing the fight, analysts pointed out that Joe Frazier and Ken Norton, who had given Ali four tough battles and won two of them, had both been devastated by Foreman in second-round knockouts. Ali was 32 years old, and had clearly lost speed and reflexes since his twenties. Contrary to his later persona, Foreman was at the time a brooding and intimidating presence. Almost no-one associated with the sport, not even Ali's long-time supporter Howard Cosell, gave the former champion a chance of winning.

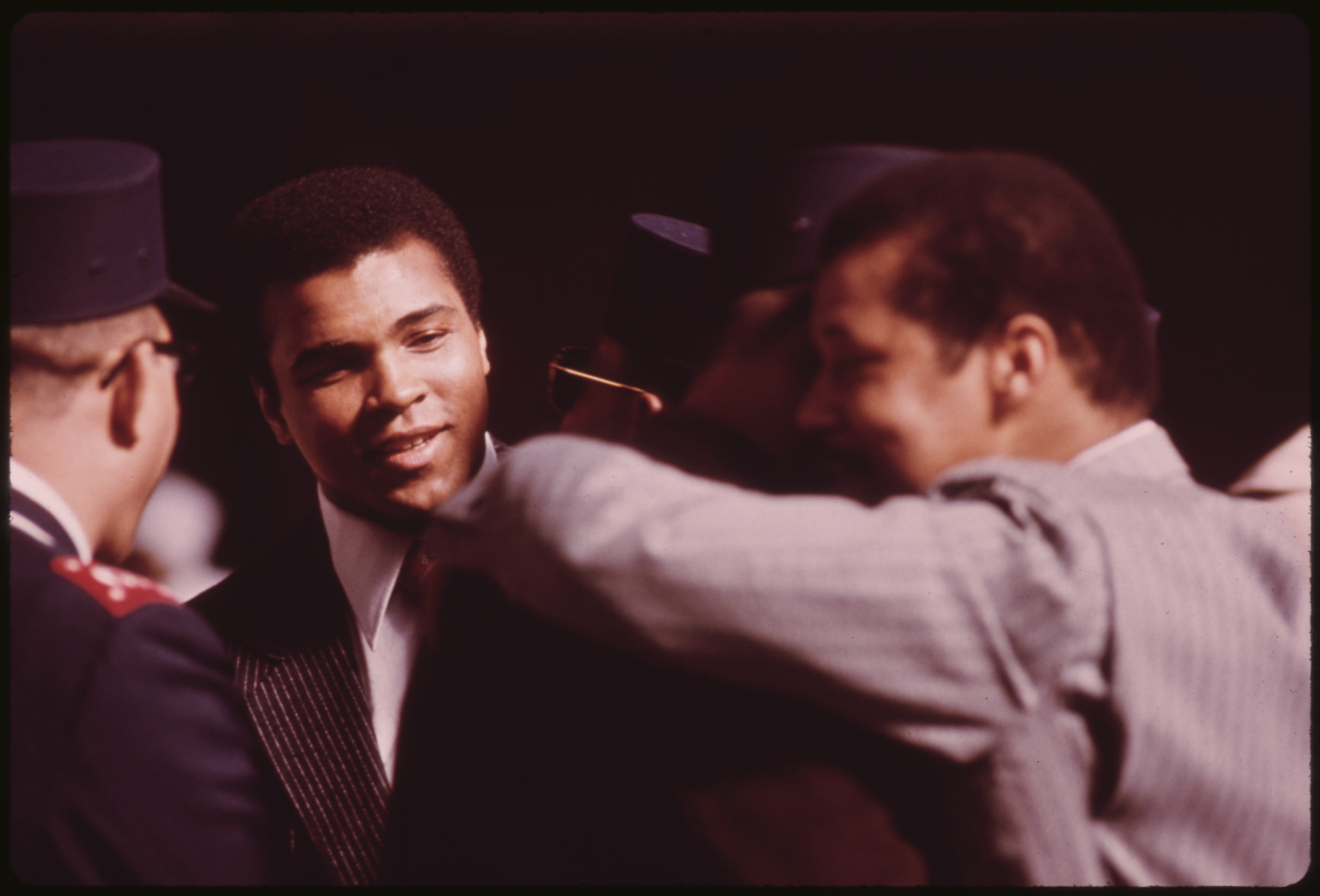
Ali in 1974

As usual, Ali was confident and colorful before the fight. He told interviewer David Frost, "If you think the world was surprised when Nixon resigned, wait 'til I whup Foreman's behind!" He told the press, "I've done something new for this fight. I done wrestled with an alligator, I done tussled with a whale; handcuffed lightning, thrown thunder in jail; only last week, I murdered a rock, injured a stone, hospitalized a brick; I'm so mean I make medicine sick." Ali was wildly popular in Zaire, with crowds chanting "Ali, bomaye" ("Ali, kill him") wherever he went.

Ali opened the fight moving and scoring with right crosses to Foreman's head. Then, beginning in the second round, and to the consternation of his corner, Ali retreated to the ropes and invited Foreman to hit him while covering up, clinching and counter-punching, all while verbally taunting Foreman. The move, which would later become known as the "Rope-a-dope", so violated conventional boxing wisdom—letting one of the hardest hitters in boxing strike at will—that at ringside writer George Plimpton thought the fight had to be fixed. Foreman, increasingly angered, threw punches that were deflected and did not land squarely. Midway through the fight, as Foreman began tiring, Ali countered more frequently and effectively with punches and flurries, which electrified the pro-Ali crowd. In the eighth round, Ali dropped an exhausted Foreman with a combination at center ring; Foreman failed to make the count. Against the odds, and amidst pandemonium in the ring, Ali had regained the title by knockout. Reflecting on the fight, George Foreman later said: "I thought Ali was just one more knockout victim until, about the seventh round, I hit him hard to the jaw and he held me and whispered in my ear: 'That all you got, George?' I realized that this ain't what I thought it was."

=== Fights against Wepner, Lyle and Bugner ===
Ali's next opponents included Chuck Wepner, Ron Lyle, and Joe Bugner. Wepner, a journeyman known as "The Bayonne Bleeder", stunned Ali with a knockdown in the ninth round; Ali would later say he tripped on Wepner's foot, or that Wepner had actually stepped on Ali's foot and he lost his balance. Wepner denied these claims, saying "in a fight, if somebody steps on your foot and knocks you down, you jump up and start screaming. Ali never did that. He took the eight count." Ali's version of events are considered more accurate. It was a bout that would inspire Sylvester Stallone to create the acclaimed film, Rocky.

=== Third fight against Joe Frazier ===
Ali then agreed to a third match with Joe Frazier in Manila. The bout, known as the "Thrilla in Manila", was held on October 1, 1975, in temperatures approaching 100 °F (38 °C). In the first rounds, Ali was aggressive, moving and exchanging blows with Frazier. However, Ali soon appeared to tire and adopted the "rope-a-dope" strategy, frequently resorting to clinches. During this part of the bout Ali did some effective counter-punching, but for the most part absorbed punishment from a relentlessly attacking Frazier. In the 12th round, Frazier began to tire, and Ali scored several sharp blows that closed Frazier's left eye and opened a cut over his right eye. With Frazier's vision now diminished, Ali dominated the 13th and 14th rounds, at times conducting what boxing historian Mike Silver called "target practice" on Frazier's head. The fight was stopped when Frazier's trainer, Eddie Futch, refused to allow Frazier to answer the bell for the 15th and final round, despite Frazier's protests. Frazier's eyes were both swollen shut. Ali, in his corner, winner by TKO, slumped on his stool, clearly spent.

An ailing Ali said afterwards that the fight "was the closest thing to dying that I know", and, when later asked if he had viewed the fight on videotape, reportedly said, "Why would I want to go back and see Hell?" After the fight he cited Frazier as "the greatest fighter of all times next to me."

== Later career ==
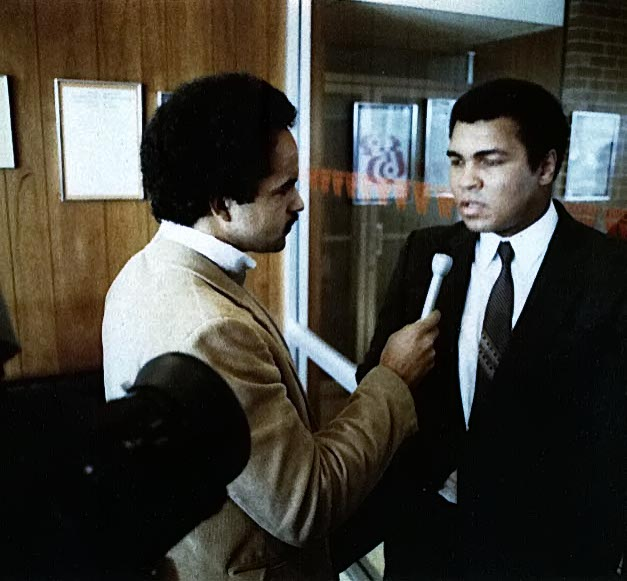
Ali being interviewed by WBAL-TV's Curt Anderson, 1978, Baltimore, Maryland

Following the Manila bout, Ali fought Jean-Pierre Coopman, Jimmy Young, and Richard Dunn, winning the last by knockout.

On June 1, 1976, Ali removed his shirt and jacket and confronted professional wrestler Gorilla Monsoon in the ring after his match at a World Wide Wrestling Federation show in Philadelphia Arena. After dodging a few punches, Monsoon put Ali in an airplane spin and dumped him to the mat. Ali stumbled to the corner, where his associate Butch Lewis convinced him to walk away. Later that month, Ali participated in an exhibition bout in Tokyo against Japanese professional wrestler and martial artist Antonio Inoki.

Ali fought Ken Norton for the third time in September 1976. The bout, which was held at Yankee Stadium, resulted in Ali winning a heavily contested decision that was loudly booed by the audience. Afterwards, he announced he was retiring from boxing to practice his faith, having converted to Sunni Islam after falling out with the Nation of Islam the previous year.

After returning to box in two exhibition bouts in April 1977 against a then 18-year-old Michael Dokes and journeyman Jody Ballard, Ali successfully defended his title for the 9th time against Alfredo Evangelista in May. Ali fought again in September 1977, struggling in a 10th title defence against hard-hitting contender Earnie Shavers. Ali was hurt in the second round but ultimately won the fight by another unanimous decision. The bout caused his long-time doctor Ferdie Pacheco to quit after he was rebuffed for telling Ali he should retire. Pacheco was quoted as saying, "the New York State Athletic Commission gave me a report that showed Ali's kidneys were falling apart. I wrote to Angelo Dundee, Ali's trainer, his wife and Ali himself. I got nothing back in response. That's when I decided enough is enough."

In February 1978, Ali faced Leon Spinks at the Hilton Hotel in Las Vegas. At the time, Spinks had only seven professional fights to his credit, and had recently fought a draw with journeyman Scott LeDoux. Ali sparred less than two dozen rounds in preparation for the fight, and was out of shape. He lost the title by split decision. Ali sought to regain his title however, and a rematch was scheduled for the fall of 1978.

Ali started training early and even travelled to Moscow, Russia to box in three exhibition fights in June of that year against Soviet Amateur champion Igor Vysotsky, Pyotar Zayev, and Yevgeny Gorstkov. Embarrassed by the Spinks loss, Ali purportedly sparred over 200 rounds in his preparation for the rematch, seemingly determined to regain his title. The Spinks rematch took place in September 1978 at the Superdome in New Orleans, Louisiana. A then-record 63,350 people attended the bout and paid a total of $6 million in admission, making it the largest live gate in boxing history at that time. A fitter and sharper Ali, although noticeably slower than his prime years, danced around Spinks and scored from range for the majority of the bout, holding his much younger opponent every time he got in close. Ali won a well deserved unanimous decision, with referee Lucien Joubert scoring rounds 10–4, judge Ernie Cojoe 10–4, and judge Herman Preis 11–4. This made Ali the first heavyweight champion to win the lineal title three times.

Following this win, on July 27, 1979, Ali announced his retirement from boxing. His retirement was short-lived, however; Ali announced his comeback to face Larry Holmes for the WBC belt in an attempt to win the heavyweight championship an unprecedented fourth time. The fight was largely motivated by Ali's need for money. Holmes' trainer Richie Giachetti said, "Larry didn't want to fight Ali. He knew Ali had nothing left; he knew it would be a horror."

It was around this time that Ali started struggling with vocal stutters and trembling hands. The Nevada Athletic Commission (NAC) ordered that he undergo a complete physical in Las Vegas before being allowed to fight again. Ali chose instead to check into the Mayo Clinic, who declared him fit to fight. Their opinion was accepted by the NAC on July 31, 1980, paving the way for Ali's return to the ring.

The fight took place on October 2, 1980, in Las Vegas Valley, with Holmes easily dominating Ali, who was weakened from thyroid medication he had taken to lose weight. Giachetti called the fight "awful ... the worst sports event I ever had to cover." Actor Sylvester Stallone was at ringside and said that it was like watching an autopsy on a man who is still alive. In the eleventh round, Angelo Dundee told the referee to stop the fight, making it the only time that Ali ever lost by stoppage. After the fight, Holmes went back to his dressing room and cried. The Holmes fight is said to have contributed to Ali's Parkinson's syndrome. Despite pleas to definitively retire, Ali fought one last time on December 11, 1981, in Nassau, Bahamas, against Trevor Berbick, losing a ten-round decision.

By the end of his boxing career Ali had absorbed 200,000 hits.

== Exhibition bouts ==
In exhibitions, Ali boxed both well-known boxers and celebrities from other walks of life, including Antonio Inoki, Michael Dokes, Sammy Davis Jr., Richard Pryor, Marvin Gaye, Burt Young, Lyle Alzado, Dave Semenko, and Puerto Rican comedian Jose Miguel Agrelot (with Iris Chacon acting as Agrelot's corner-woman).

=== Ali vs Inoki ===
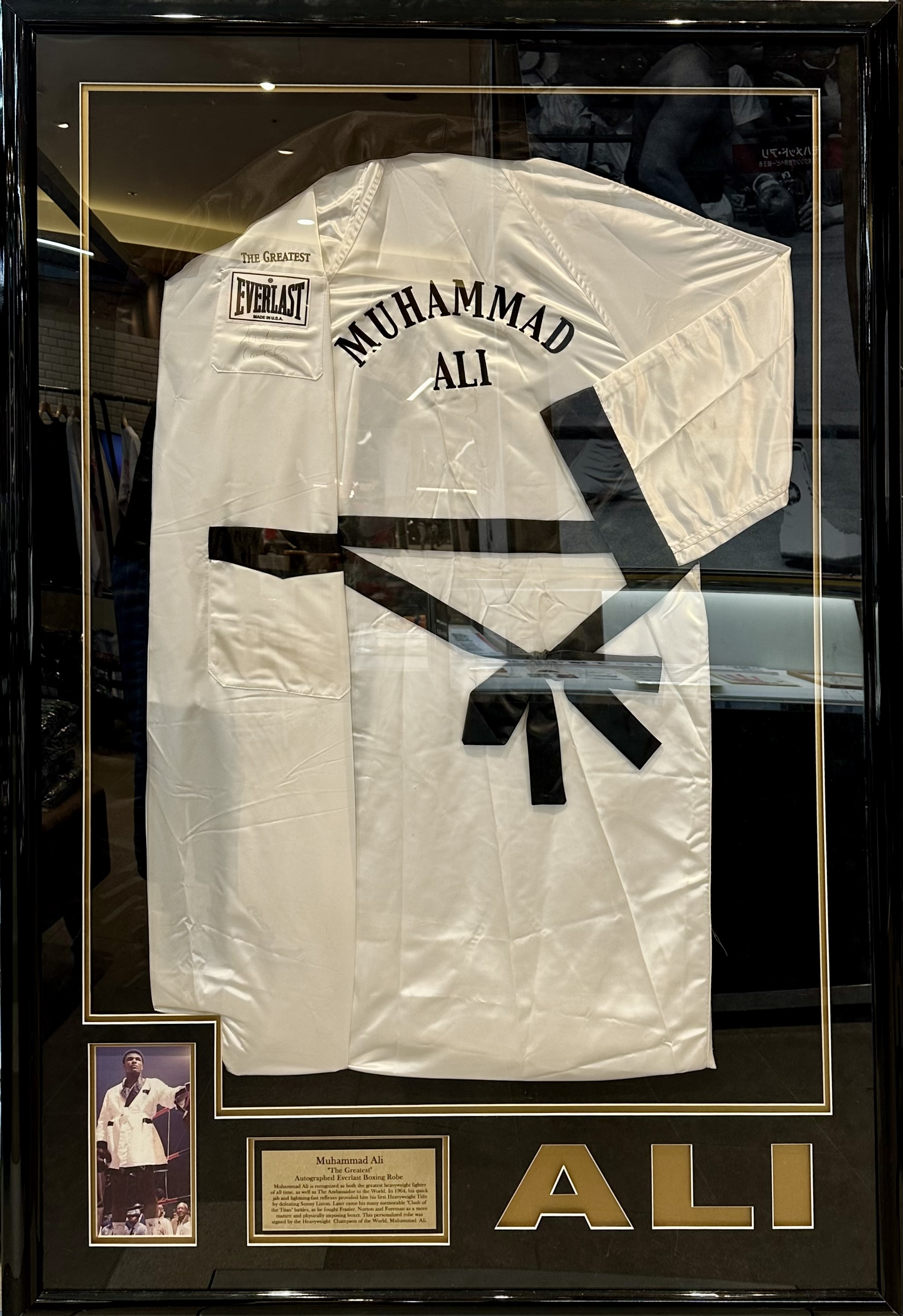
Muhammad Ali's boxing robe at Antonio Inoki Exhibition

On June 26, 1976, Ali participated in an exhibition bout in Tokyo against Japanese professional wrestler and martial artist Antonio Inoki. Ali was only able to land two jabs while Inoki's kicks caused two blood clots and an infection that almost resulted in Ali's leg being amputated, as a result of Ali's team insisting on rules restricting Inoki's ability to wrestle. Because of this, the fight has been criticized for causing Ali trouble healthwise, mostly in terms of movement, later down the line; Ferdie Pacheco stated "Ali was still feeling the effects of his leg injury, and his mobility was not what it had been". The match was not scripted and ultimately declared a draw. After Ali's death, The New York Times declared it his least memorable fight. Most boxing commentators at the time viewed the fight negatively and hoped it would be forgotten as some considered it a "15-round farce". Today it is considered by some to be one of Ali's most influential fights and CBS Sports said the attention the mixed-style bout received "foretold the arrival of standardized MMA years later". Ali and Inoki began a friendship after the fight.

=== Ali vs Alzado ===
In 1979, Ali fought an exhibition match against NFL player Lyle Alzado. The fight went 8 rounds and was declared a draw.

=== Ali vs Semenko ===
Ali fought NHL player, Dave Semenko in an exhibition on June 12, 1983. The match was officially a draw after going three rounds, but the Canadian Press reported Ali was not seriously trying for most of the bout, instead just toying with Semenko.

=== In Iran ===
Muhammad Ali last fight exhibition in Tehran, Iran 1993

Ali visited Iran in 1993 as a humanitarian mission for prisoners of war of the Iran–Iraq war, including an exhibition match in Tehran.

== Boxing style ==
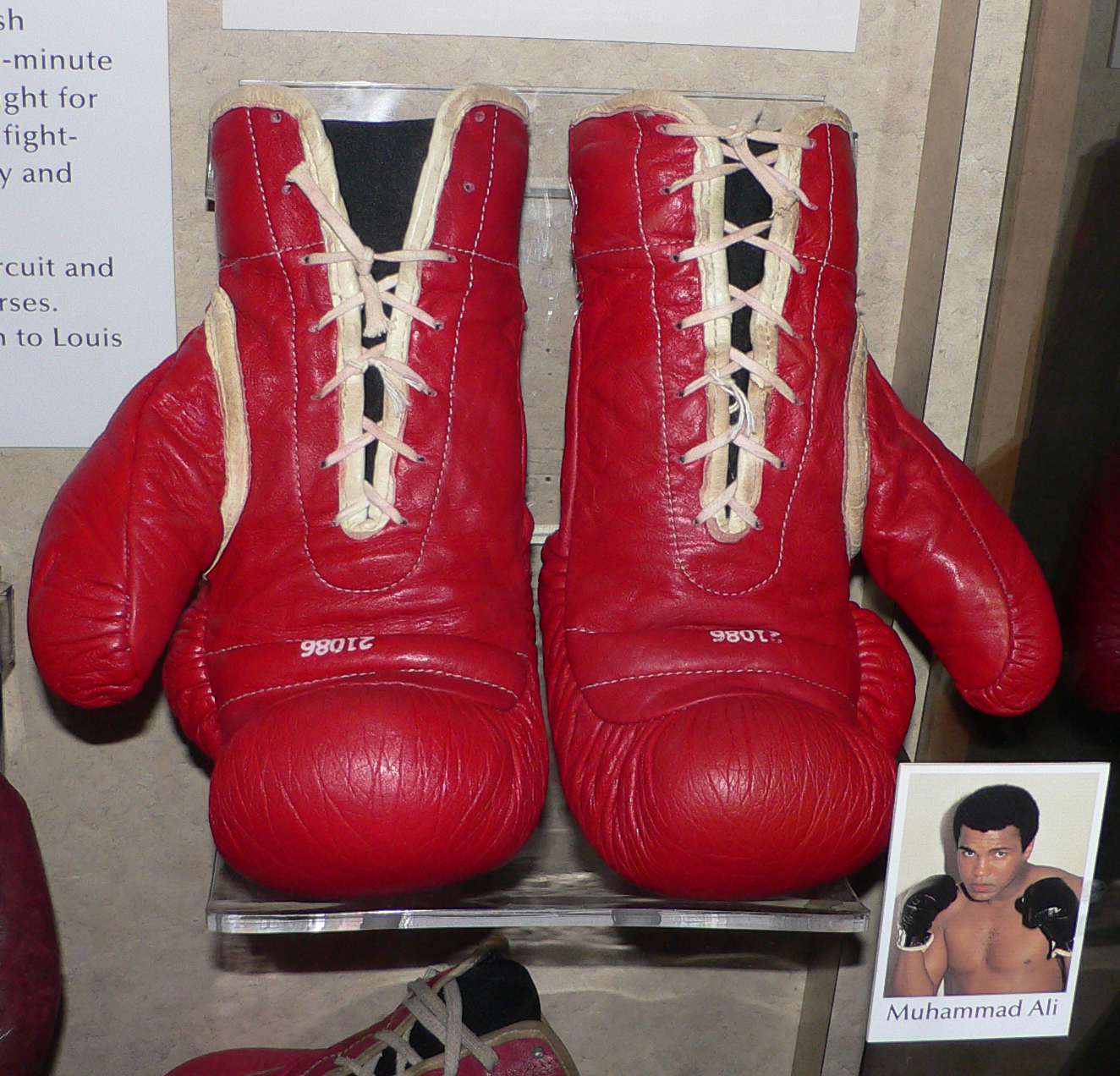
Muhammad Ali's boxing gloves are preserved in the Smithsonian Institution National Museum of American History.

Ali had a highly unorthodox boxing style for a heavyweight (210 pounds), epitomized by his catchphrase "float like a butterfly, sting like a bee." Ali relied early in his career on his incredible hand speed, superb reflexes and constant movement, dancing and circling opponents for most of the fight, holding his hands low and lashing out with a quick, cutting left jab that he threw from unpredictable angles. His footwork made it difficult for opponents to cut down the ring and corner Ali against the ropes. He was also able to quickly dodge punches with his speed, head movement, dancing and footwork.

One of Ali's greatest tricks was to make opponents overcommit by pulling straight backward from punches. Disciplined, world-class boxers chased Ali and threw themselves off balance attempting to hit him because he seemed to be an open target, only missing and leaving themselves exposed to Ali's counter punches, usually a chopping right. Slow motion replays show that this was precisely the way Sonny Liston was hit and apparently knocked out by Ali in their second fight. Ali often flaunted his movement by dancing the "Ali Shuffle", a sort of center-ring jig. Ali's early style was so unusual that he was initially discounted because he reminded boxing writers of a lightweight, and it was assumed he would be vulnerable to big hitters like Sonny Liston.

In 1969, Sports Illustrated measured Ali's jab with an omegascope, finding it covered 16.5 inches in just 4/100 of a second—the speed of a blink of an eye. Jimmy Jacobs, who co-managed Mike Tyson, used a synchronizer to measure young Ali's punching speed versus Sugar Ray Robinson, a welter/middleweight who was considered pound-for-pound the best fighter in history. Ali was 25% faster than Robinson, even though Ali was 45–50 pounds heavier. Ali's punches produced approximately 1,000 pounds of force. "No matter what his opponents heard about him, they didn't realize how fast he was until they got in the ring with him", Jacobs said. The effect of Ali's punches was cumulative. Charlie Powell, who fought Ali early in Ali's career and was knocked out in the third round, said: "When he first hit me I said to myself, 'I can take two of these to get one in myself.' But in a little while I found myself getting dizzier and dizzier every time he hit me. He throws punches so easily that you don't realize how much they hurt you until it's too late."

Commenting on fighting the young Ali, George Chuvalo said: "He was just so damn fast. When he was young, he moved his legs and hands at the same time. He threw his punches when he was in motion. He'd be out of punching range, and as he moved into range he'd already begun to throw the punch. So if you waited until he got into range to punch back, he beat you every time."

Floyd Patterson said, "It's very hard to hit a moving target, and (Ali) moved all the time, with such grace, three minutes of every round for fifteen rounds. He never stopped. It was extraordinary."

Darrell Foster, who trained Will Smith for the movie Ali, said: "Ali's signature punches were the left jab and the overhand right. But there were at least six different ways Ali used to jab. One was a jab that Ali called the 'snake lick', like cobra striking that comes from the floor almost, really low down. Then there was Ali's rapid-fire jab—three to five jabs in succession rapidly fired at his opponents' eyes to create a blur in [the latter's] face so he wouldn't be able to see [Ali's] right hand coming behind it."

=== Footwork ===
An unconventional "dancing" style of footwork was popularized by Ali in 1961. He moved side to side, and forward and back, while bouncing on the balls of his feet and dancing around his opponents. This allowed him to quickly move to wherever he wanted in the ring. He also occasionally shuffled his feet back and forth quickly, confusing his opponents before landing a blow, a move called the Ali shuffle. His unconventional footwork was referred to as the "dancing legs" at the time.

Ali's footwork notably influenced martial artist and actor Bruce Lee, who studied Ali's footwork and incorporated it into his own Jeet Kune Do style of hybrid martial arts in the 1960s.

=== Trash-talk ===
Ali regularly taunted and baited his opponents—including Liston, Frazier, and Foreman—before the fight and often during the bout itself. He said Frazier was "too dumb to be champion", that he would whip Liston "like his Daddy did", that Terrell was an "Uncle Tom" for refusing to call Ali by his name and continuing to call him Cassius Clay, calling Patterson a "rabbit", and calling Foreman "a mummy". In speaking of how Ali stoked Liston's anger and overconfidence before their first fight, one writer commented that "the most brilliant fight strategy in boxing history was devised by a teenager who had graduated 376 in a class of 391."

Ali typically portrayed himself as the "people's champion" and his opponent as a tool of the (white) establishment. During the early part of his career, he built a reputation for predicting rounds in which he would finish opponents, often vowing to crawl across the ring or to leave the country if he lost the bout. Ali adopted the latter practice from "Gorgeous" George Wagner, a professional wrestling champion who drew thousands of fans to his matches as "the man you love to hate." When Ali was 19, Wagner, who was in town to wrestle Freddie Blassie and had crossed paths with Clay, told the boxer before a bout with Duke Sabedong in Las Vegas, "A lot of people will pay to see someone shut your mouth. So keep on bragging, keep on sassing and always be outrageous."

ESPN columnist Ralph Wiley called Ali "The King of Trash Talk". In 2013, The Guardian said Ali exemplified boxing's "golden age of trash-talking." Bleacher Report called Clay's description of Sonny Liston smelling like a bear and his vow to donate him to a zoo after he beat him the greatest trash-talk line in sports history.

=== Rope-a-dope ===
In the opinion of many observers, Ali became a different fighter after the 3½-year layoff. Ferdie Pacheco, Ali's corner physician, noted that he had lost his ability to move and dance as before. This forced Ali to become more stationary and exchange punches more frequently, exposing him to more punishment while indirectly revealing his tremendous ability to take a punch. This physical change led in part to the "rope-a-dope" strategy, where Ali would lie back on the ropes, cover up to protect himself and conserve energy, and tempt opponents to punch themselves out. Ali often taunted opponents in the process and lashed back with sudden, unexpected combinations. The strategy was dramatically successful in the George Foreman fight, but less so in the first Joe Frazier bout when it was introduced.

=== Later years ===
Of his later career, Arthur Mercante said: "Ali knew all the tricks. He was the best fighter I ever saw in terms of clinching. Not only did he use it to rest, but he was big and strong and knew how to lean on opponents and push and shove and pull to tire them out. Ali was so smart. Most guys are just in there fighting, but Ali had a sense of everything that was happening, almost as though he was sitting at ringside analyzing the fight while he fought it."

In the mid-1970s, Ali took an interest in Asian martial arts, such as karate and taekwondo. The founder of American taekwondo, Jhoon Goo Rhee, coached Ali for several fights. A punching technique that Rhee taught him was the "accupunch", a technique that Rhee himself had originally learnt from Bruce Lee. The "accupunch" is a rapid fast punch that is very difficult to block, based on human reaction time—"the idea is to finish the execution of the punch before the opponent can complete the brain-to-wrist communication." Ali was reportedly unable to block the punch when Rhee first demonstrated it to him. Ali later used the "accupunch" to knock out Richard Dunn in 1976.

== Ali and his contemporaries ==
=== Ali and Frazier ===
==== Friendship ====
In an interview published in 2002, Joe Frazier recalled that he had first met Ali around 1968. At this time Ali was continuing his legal fight to get his boxing license back, and Frazier was the undisputed heavyweight champion of the world. Frazier stated that he had campaigned vigorously for Ali to get his license; this included going to Washington and meeting the president to lobby on Ali's behalf. Frazier also lent Ali some money at this time.

According to Dave Wolf, former sports editor of Life and a member of Frazier's entourage, Frazier was keen for Ali's return to boxing, because he believed that beating Ali would win him unambiguous acknowledgement as the "best". According to Wolf, Frazier was also kind to Ali during this time—agreeing to participate in staged confrontations, which enabled Ali to get publicity and earn money giving lectures. Wolf states that Frazier had deep respect for Ali's religious beliefs, and even participated in Muslim services at Ali's suggestion. Until Ali got "nasty" before their first fight, Frazier endorsed Ali's refusal to be drafted; Wolf recalls: "I remember [Frazier] telling me, 'If Baptists weren't allowed to fight, I wouldn't fight either'."

Ali and Frazier knew they would become wealthy if Ali returned to the ring. Prior to their first fight, both had expressed a liking for each other. In 1970, Ali had stated: "Me and Joe Frazier will be buddies. I just want it to go down in history that I didn't sell out or Uncle Tom when I got famous, and I don't think Joe Frazier's going to do that either. He ain't dumb."

==== Opponents ====
Ali and Frazier fought three fights in the span of five years; the first and third of these are widely regarded to be among the greatest of all boxing bouts, and the Ali-Frazier rivalry has been hailed as one of the greatest any sport has seen. Writing in Sports Illustrated, William Nack commented:

Of all the names joined forever in the annals of boxing—from Dempsey-Tunney to Louis-Schmeling, from Zale-Graziano to Leonard-Hearns—none are more fiercely bound by a hyphen than Ali-Frazier. Not Palmer-Nicklaus in golf nor Borg-McEnroe in tennis, as ardently competitive as these rivalries were, conjure up anything remotely close to the epic theater of Ali-Frazier.

According to Ali, Frazier's style of boxing made him a tougher opponent for him than Liston or Foreman because he was vulnerable to Frazier's in-close left hook. Had he fought with Frazier before his three-and-half year break from boxing, when he was younger, "I'd have danced for fifteen rounds, and Joe wouldn't have ever caught me." (Note: [Frazier] was harder for me than Liston or Foreman, because he had what I was vulnerable to—a good in-close left hook. Foreman wasn't an infighter or a hooker. He was an uppercutter with a right hand and a jab, always looking you in the eye. Liston was scarier than Frazier, but I fought Liston when I was young. Joe stayed on me, always on my chest, and from out of nowhere he'd throw the hook. If I was young, I'd have danced for fifteen rounds, and Joe wouldn't have ever caught me. But the first time we fought, I was three-and-half years out of shape. — Muhammad Ali)

After Thrilla in Manila, Frazier called Ali "a great champion", and, referring to Ali, graciously stated that "[m]y man fought a good fight"; while Ali declared Frazier to be "the greatest fighter of all time next to me."

==== Trash-talk and altercations ====
In the buildup to their bouts, Ali called Frazier "dumb" and an "Uncle Tom" before their first, "ignorant" before the second, and a "gorilla" before the third. Writers Dennis and Don Atyeo have noted that given Ali's warm words for Frazier in the past, his jibes about Frazier sounded hollow.

On January 23, 1974, five days before their second fight, Ali and Frazier had a public altercation captured on television. ABC Sports' Howard Cosell had arranged for the two to come to the studio to comment on their first fight. Things went smoothly until Frazier commented about Ali having to visit a hospital after the fight. Ali immediately responded by claiming he had gone to a hospital for ten minutes whereas Frazier had been hospitalized for three weeks after the fight, (Note: According to Dave Wolf, the reason for Frazier's hospitalization was hypertension from which he had been suffering before the fight.) and concluded by calling Frazier "ignorant". Frazier then snapped; removing his studio earplug, Frazier reached across to Ali, protesting the use of the word "ignorant". Soon the two were wrestling on the floor, until they were separated by onlookers. (Note: Larry Holmes commented that instead of letting Ali's words upset him, Frazier's response to Ali calling him ignorant should have been: "Yeah, okay, I might be ignorant, but this ignorant man is going to kick your ass."Eig)

According to veteran boxing commentator Ronnie Nathanielsz, during the buildup to Thrilla in Manilla, Ali once awakened Frazier in the middle of the night by constantly screaming. When Frazier appeared on the balcony of his hotel room, Ali pointed a toy gun at him and shouted: "I am going to shoot you."

Immediately after Thrilla in Manilla, Ali summoned Frazier's son Marvis to his dressing room and apologized for the things he had said about Frazier. (Note: Ali asked for me to come to his dressing room before any of the press arrived. I went in there and Ali was real tired and he hugged me and apologized for what he'd said about my father before the fight. He said, 'Tell your father he's a great man'. — Marvis Frazier) When Marvis conveyed Ali's contrition to his father, Frazier commented that Ali should have communicated this to him directly. After returning to the United States, Ali called boxing promoter and manager Butch Lewis, and asked for Frazier's private number, saying he wanted to apologize to Frazier. However, when Lewis conveyed this request to Frazier, he was told not to share the phone number with Ali.

==== Finale ====
In 1988, Ali and Frazier joined George Foreman, Larry Holmes, and Ken Norton in Las Vegas for the making of the film Champions Forever. At a local gym, Frazier came across Ali before a crowd of spectators, and said: "Look at Ali. Look what's happened to him. All your talkin', man. I'm faster than you are now. You're damaged goods." Ali, already afflicted with Parkinson's, insisted that he remained faster than Frazier and pointing to a heavy bag suggested the two compete to see which of them could hit the bag the fastest. Frazier immediately took off his coat, moved to the bag and threw a dozen rapid punches at it accompanied by loud grunts. Without removing his coat, Ali strolled towards the bag, held the ready stance, mimicked one of Frazier's grunts without throwing a punch, and then addressed Frazier with the words "Wanna see it again, Joe?" Everyone laughed, except Frazier.

Later that day, Frazier started walking towards Ali after having had too much to drink. Ali biographer Thomas Hauser, who was present, recalled that for the next 10 minutes Larry Holmes positioned himself between Ali and Frazier, preventing Frazier from reaching Ali. George Foreman then took over and acted as Ali's shield for the next 10 minutes. Throughout this incident, Ali remained oblivious to what was going on.

In his 1996 autobiography Smokin' Joe: The Autobiography of a Heavyweight Champion of the World, in which he always refers to Ali as Cassius Clay, Frazier wrote:

Truth is, I'd like to rumble with that sucker [Ali] again—beat him up piece by piece and mail him back to Jesus. ... Now people ask me if I feel bad for him, now that things aren't going so well for him. Nope. I don't. Fact is, I don't give a damn. They want me to love him, but I'll open up the graveyard and bury his ass when the Lord chooses to take him.

Commenting on Ali lighting the Olympic flame in 1996, Frazier stated that it would have been good if Ali had fallen into the cauldron after lighting the flame, and that he would have pushed Ali in himself if he had the chance to do so. In a press conference held on July 30, 1996, Frazier accused Ali of being a "draft dodger" and a racist, (Note: In the 1996 press conference, Frazier stated that "[Ali] didn't like his white brothers." Prior to their first fight, Frazier had questioned Ali's commitment to blacks, given "a lot of guys around him are white.") and claimed he would have been a better choice to light the Olympic flame. Also in 1996, Frazier claimed Ali was suffering from "Joe Frazier-itis" and "left-hook-itis".

In a 1997 interview, Frazier expressed no regret for the words he had used for Ali at the 1996 Atlanta Olympics. According to Frazier:

We weren't animals. We were human beings. He called me a gorilla. An Uncle Tom. Uncle Tom? I grew up so poor and so black in South Carolina, even the water we drank was colored. The only guy I 'tommed' for was him, giving in to him. God gave him so many gifts. Fast. Pretty. Smart. Strong. He didn't have to do what he did.

In a 2001 interview with The New York Times, Ali again apologized to Frazier for calling him names which, Ali claimed, was done to promote their fights. Frazier initially accepted the apology saying it was time to put this issue behind them. However, subsequently Frazier commented that Ali should apologize directly to him instead of apologizing through a newspaper. Reacting to this, Ali stated: "If you see Frazier, you tell him he's still a gorilla."

In his interview in Stephen Brunt's 2002 book Facing Ali, Frazier, referring to how he had contributed to Ali's infirmity, claimed he was sure Ali thinks of him whenever he gets out of bed, and that whatever Ali was undergoing was the will of God. (Note: In his book, Brunt notes Frazier's struggle of revealing his genuine beliefs about Ali, and being savvy, because by now he had people looking after his commercial interests, and "somebody probably had a talk with him about image and public relations and how they relate to earning potential ... Still, even the new, polished, packaged Frazier has his moments.")

In a 2008 interview, Frazier stated he had forgiven Ali, but was unable to comment on whether Ali's present condition was due to divine punishment, as he had earlier stated, since "God works in a mysterious way."

In 2011, on the eve of the 40th anniversary of his first fight with Ali, and the year of his death, Frazier reiterated that he had forgiven Ali. (Note: In a column in the Hartford Courant, published the day after Frazier's death, Jeff Jacobs wrote: "I hope Smokin' Joe did [forgave Ali]. I hope he let every inch of hate go. The Greatest and The Greatest Opponent deserve to join gloves and walk together into immortality.) Frazier's funeral service was attended by Ali who reportedly stood and clapped vigorously when the Rev. Jesse Jackson asked the mourners to stand and bring their hands together one last time for Frazier.

== Titles in boxing ==
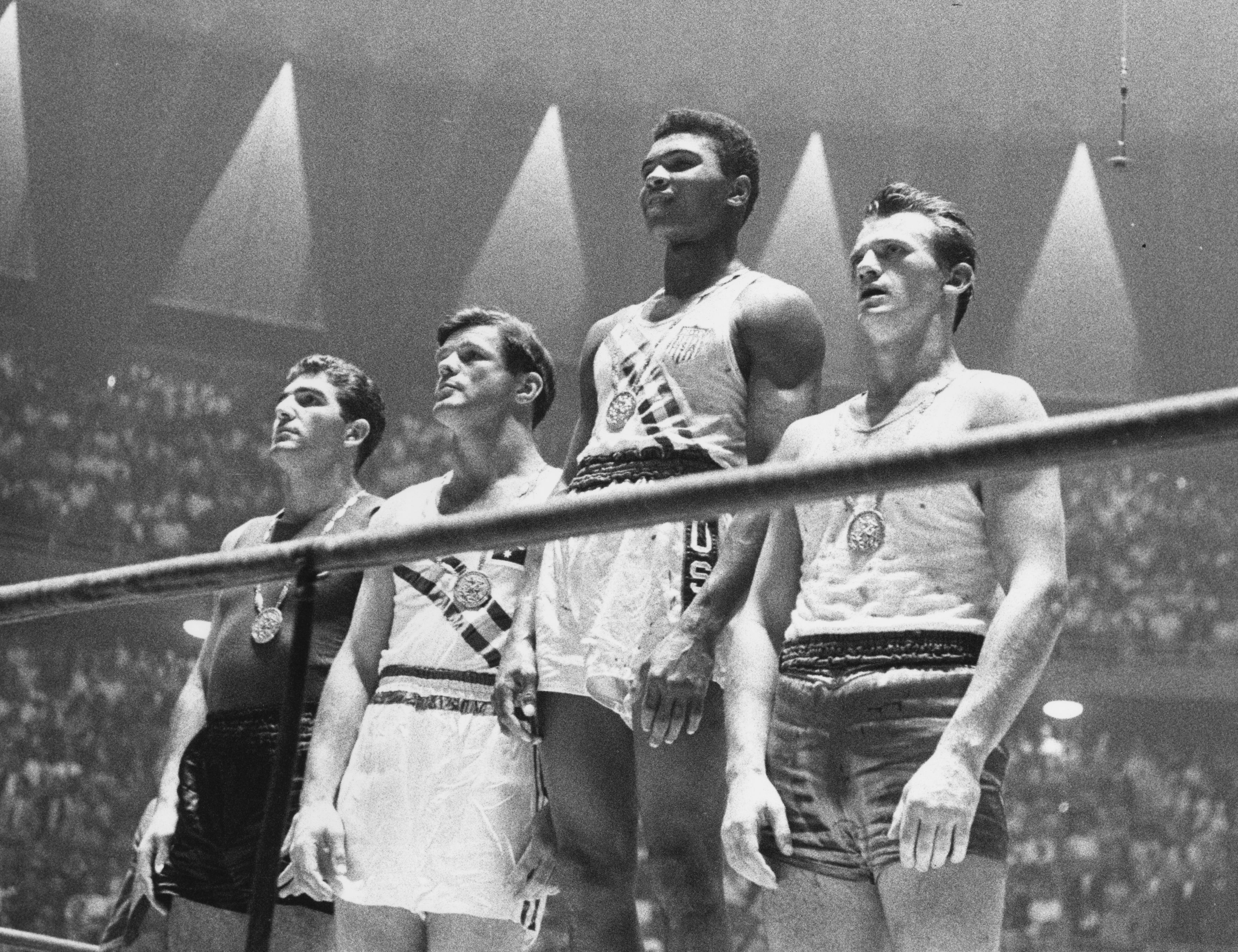
Cassius Clay, later Muhammad Ali, (second from right) at the 1960 Olympics

=== Major world titles ===
- NYSAC heavyweight champion
  - 9 title defenses
- WBA heavyweight champion (4x)
  - 15 total title wins
  - 11 title defenses (overall)
    - 0 title defenses (first reign)
    - 1 title defense (second reign)
    - 10 title defenses (third reign)
    - 0 title defenses (fourth reign)
- WBC heavyweight champion (2x)
  - 21 total title wins
  - 19 title defenses (overall)
    - 9 defenses (first reign)
    - 10 defenses (second reign)
- Lineal heavyweight champion (3×) (Note: The only three-time lineal heavyweight champion ever.)
  - 22 total title wins
  - 19 title defenses (overall)
    - 9 title defenses (first reign)
    - 10 title defense (second reign)
    - 0 title defenses (third reign)

=== Other world titles ===
==== The Ring magazine titles ====
- The Ring heavyweight champion (3×) (Note: The only three-time The Ring heavyweight champion ever.)

==== Undisputed titles ====
- Undisputed heavyweight champion (3x) (Note: The only three-time undisputed heavyweight champion ever.)

=== Regional titles ===
- NABF heavyweight champion (3×)

=== Honorary titles ===
- WBA Legend of Boxing
- WBC King of Boxing
- WBC Diamond champion
- Hickok Belt

=== Amateur titles ===
- Olympic light heavyweight champion (gold medal, 1960)
- U.S. Olympic Trials light heavyweight champion
- AAU national champion (2×)
- National Golden Gloves champion (2×)
- Kentucky Golden Gloves champion (6×)
- Chicago Golden Gloves light heavyweight champion (2×)
- Tomorrow's Champions WAVE-TV Division Winner

== Professional boxing record ==
61 fights	56 wins	5 losses
By knockout	37	1
By decision	19	4

No.	Result	Record	Opponent	Type	Round, time	Date	Age	Location	Notes
61	Loss	56–5	Trevor Berbick	UD	10	Dec 11, 1981	39 years, 328 days	Queen Elizabeth Sports Centre, Nassau, Bahamas	
60	Loss	56–4	Larry Holmes	RTD	10 (15), 3:00	Oct 2, 1980	38 years, 259 days	Caesars Palace, Paradise, Nevada, U.S.	For WBC, and vacant The Ring heavyweight titles
59	Win	56–3	Leon Spinks	UD	15	Sep 15, 1978	36 years, 241 days	Superdome, New Orleans, Louisiana, U.S.	Won WBA and The Ring heavyweight titles
58	Loss	55–3	Leon Spinks	SD	15	Feb 15, 1978	36 years, 29 days	Las Vegas Hilton, Winchester, Nevada, U.S.	Lost WBA, WBC, and The Ring heavyweight titles
57	Win	55–2	Earnie Shavers	UD	15	Sep 29, 1977	35 years, 255 days	Madison Square Garden, New York City, New York, U.S.	Retained WBA, WBC, and The Ring heavyweight titles
56	Win	54–2	Alfredo Evangelista	UD	15	May 16, 1977	35 years, 119 days	Capital Centre, Landover, Maryland, U.S.	Retained WBA, WBC, and The Ring heavyweight titles
55	Win	53–2	Ken Norton	UD	15	Sep 28, 1976	34 years, 255 days	Yankee Stadium, New York City, New York, U.S.	Retained WBA, WBC, and The Ring heavyweight titles
54	Win	52–2	Richard Dunn	TKO	5 (15), 2:05	May 24, 1976	34 years, 128 days	Olympiahalle, Munich, West Germany	Retained WBA, WBC, and The Ring heavyweight titles
53	Win	51–2	Jimmy Young	UD	15	Apr 30, 1976	34 years, 104 days	Capital Centre, Landover, Maryland, U.S.	Retained WBA, WBC, and The Ring heavyweight titles
52	Win	50–2	Jean-Pierre Coopman	KO	5 (15), 2:46	Feb 20, 1976	34 years, 34 days	Roberto Clemente Coliseum, San Juan, Puerto Rico	Retained WBA, WBC, and The Ring heavyweight titles
51	Win	49–2	Joe Frazier	RTD	14 (15), 3:00	Oct 1, 1975	33 years, 257 days	Philippine Coliseum, Quezon City, Philippines	Retained WBA, WBC, and The Ring heavyweight titles
50	Win	48–2	Joe Bugner	UD	15	July 1, 1975	33 years, 164 days	Stadium Merdeka, Kuala Lumpur, Malaysia	Retained WBA, WBC, and The Ring heavyweight titles
49	Win	47–2	Ron Lyle	TKO	11 (15), 1:08	May 16, 1975	33 years, 119 days	Las Vegas Convention Center, Winchester, Nevada, U.S.	Retained WBA, WBC, and The Ring heavyweight titles
48	Win	46–2	Chuck Wepner	TKO	15 (15), 2:41	Mar 24, 1975	33 years, 66 days	Coliseum, Richfield, Ohio, U.S.	Retained WBA, WBC, and The Ring heavyweight titles
47	Win	45–2	George Foreman	KO	8 (15), 2:58	Oct 30, 1974	32 years, 286 days	Stade du 20 Mai, Kinshasa, Zaire	Won WBA, WBC, and The Ring heavyweight titles
46	Win	44–2	Joe Frazier	UD	12	Jan 28, 1974	32 years, 11 days	Madison Square Garden, New York City, New York, U.S.	Retained NABF heavyweight title
45	Win	43–2	Rudie Lubbers	UD	12	Oct 20, 1973	31 years, 276 days	Gelora Bung Karno Stadium, Jakarta, Indonesia	
44	Win	42–2	Ken Norton	SD	12	Sep 10, 1973	31 years, 236 days	The Forum, Inglewood, California, U.S.	Won NABF heavyweight title
43	Loss	41–2	Ken Norton	SD	12	Mar 31, 1973	31 years, 73 days	Sports Arena, San Diego, California, U.S.	Lost NABF heavyweight title
42	Win	41–1	Joe Bugner	UD	12	Feb 14, 1973	31 years, 28 days	Las Vegas Convention Center, Winchester, Nevada, U.S.	
41	Win	40–1	Bob Foster	KO	8 (12), 0:40	Nov 21, 1972	30 years, 309 days	Sahara Tahoe, Stateline, Nevada, U.S.	Retained NABF heavyweight title
40	Win	39–1	Floyd Patterson	RTD	7 (12), 3:00	Sep 20, 1972	30 years, 247 days	Madison Square Garden, New York City, New York, U.S.	Retained NABF heavyweight title
39	Win	38–1	Alvin Lewis	TKO	11 (12), 1:15	Jul 19, 1972	30 years, 184 days	Croke Park, Dublin, Ireland	
38	Win	37–1	Jerry Quarry	TKO	7 (12), 0:19	Jun 27, 1972	30 years, 162 days	Las Vegas Convention Center, Winchester, Nevada, U.S.	Retained NABF heavyweight title
37	Win	36–1	George Chuvalo	UD	12	May 1, 1972	30 years, 105 days	Pacific Coliseum, Vancouver, British Columbia, Canada	Retained NABF heavyweight title
36	Win	35–1	Mac Foster	UD	15	Apr 1, 1972	30 years, 75 days	Nippon Budokan, Tokyo, Japan	
35	Win	34–1	Jürgen Blin	KO	7 (12), 2:12	Dec 26, 1971	29 years, 343 days	Hallenstadion, Zürich, Switzerland	
34	Win	33–1	Buster Mathis	UD	12	Nov 17, 1971	29 years, 304 days	Astrodome, Houston, Texas, U.S.	Retained NABF heavyweight title
33	Win	32–1	Jimmy Ellis	TKO	12 (12), 2:10	Jul 26, 1971	29 years, 190 days	Astrodome, Houston, Texas, U.S.	Won vacant NABF heavyweight title
32	Loss	31–1	Joe Frazier	UD	15	Mar 8, 1971	29 years, 50 days	Madison Square Garden, New York City, New York, U.S.	For WBA, WBC, and The Ring heavyweight titles
31	Win	31–0	Oscar Bonavena	TKO	15 (15), 2:03	Dec 7, 1970	28 years, 324 days	Madison Square Garden, New York City, New York, U.S.	Won vacant NABF heavyweight title
30	Win	30–0	Jerry Quarry	RTD	3 (15), 3:00	Oct 26, 1970	28 years, 282 days	Municipal Auditorium, Atlanta, Georgia, U.S.	
29	Win	29–0	Zora Folley	KO	7 (15), 1:48	Mar 22, 1967	25 years, 64 days	Madison Square Garden, New York City, New York, U.S.	Retained WBA, WBC, NYSAC, and The Ring heavyweight titles
28	Win	28–0	Ernie Terrell	UD	15	Feb 6, 1967	25 years, 20 days	Astrodome, Houston, Texas, U.S.	Retained WBC, NYSAC, and The Ring heavyweight titles; Won WBA heavyweight title
27	Win	27–0	Cleveland Williams	TKO	3 (15), 1:08	Nov 14, 1966	24 years, 301 days	Astrodome, Houston, Texas, U.S.	Retained WBC, NYSAC, and The Ring heavyweight titles
26	Win	26–0	Karl Mildenberger	TKO	12 (15), 1:30	Sep 10, 1966	24 years, 236 days	Waldstadion, Frankfurt, West Germany	Retained WBC, NYSAC, and The Ring heavyweight titles
25	Win	25–0	Brian London	KO	3 (15), 1:40	Aug 6, 1966	24 years, 201 days	Earls Court Exhibition Centre, London, England	Retained WBC, NYSAC, and The Ring heavyweight titles
24	Win	24–0	Henry Cooper	TKO	6 (15), 1:38	May 21, 1966	24 years, 124 days	Arsenal Stadium, London, England	Retained WBC, NYSAC, and The Ring heavyweight titles
23	Win	23–0	George Chuvalo	UD	15	Mar 29, 1966	24 years, 71 days	Maple Leaf Gardens, Toronto, Canada	Retained WBC, NYSAC, and The Ring heavyweight titles
22	Win	22–0	Floyd Patterson	TKO	12 (15), 2:18	Nov 22, 1965	23 years, 309 days	Las Vegas Convention Center, Winchester, Nevada, U.S.	Retained WBC, NYSAC, and The Ring heavyweight titles
21	Win	21–0	Sonny Liston	KO	1 (15), 2:12	May 25, 1965	23 years, 128 days	Civic Center, Lewiston, Maine, U.S.	Retained WBC, NYSAC, and The Ring heavyweight titles
20	Win	20–0	Sonny Liston	RTD	6 (15), 3:00	Feb 25, 1964	22 years, 39 days	Convention Center, Miami Beach, Florida, U.S.	Won WBA, WBC, NYSAC, and The Ring heavyweight titles
19	Win	19–0	Henry Cooper	TKO	5 (10), 2:15	Jun 18, 1963	21 years, 152 days	Wembley Stadium, London, England	
18	Win	18–0	Doug Jones	UD	10	Mar 13, 1963	21 years, 55 days	Madison Square Garden, New York City, New York, U.S.	
17	Win	17–0	Charlie Powell	KO	3 (10), 2:04	Jan 24, 1963	21 years, 7 days	Civic Arena, Pittsburgh, Pennsylvania, U.S.	
16	Win	16–0	Archie Moore	TKO	4 (10), 1:35	Nov 15, 1962	20 years, 302 days	Memorial Sports Arena, Los Angeles, California, U.S.	
15	Win	15–0	Alejandro Lavorante	KO	5 (10), 1:48	Jul 20, 1962	20 years, 184 days	Memorial Sports Arena, Los Angeles, California, U.S.	
14	Win	14–0	Billy Daniels	TKO	7 (10), 2:21	May 19, 1962	20 years, 122 days	St. Nicholas Arena, New York City, New York, U.S.	
13	Win	13–0	George Logan	TKO	4 (10), 1:34	Apr 23, 1962	20 years, 96 days	Memorial Sports Arena, Los Angeles, California, U.S.	
12	Win	12–0	Don Warner	TKO	4 (10), 0:34	Feb 28, 1962	20 years, 70 days	Convention Center, Miami Beach, Florida, U.S.	
11	Win	11–0	Sonny Banks	TKO	4 (10), 0:26	Feb 10, 1962	20 years, 24 days	Madison Square Garden, New York City, New York, U.S.	
10	Win	10–0	Willi Besmanoff	TKO	7 (10), 1:55	Nov 29, 1961	19 years, 316 days	Freedom Hall, Louisville, Kentucky, U.S.	
9	Win	9–0	Alex Miteff	TKO	6 (10), 1:45	Oct 7, 1961	19 years, 263 days	Freedom Hall, Louisville, Kentucky, U.S.	
8	Win	8–0	Alonzo Johnson	UD	10	Jul 22, 1961	19 years, 186 days	Freedom Hall, Louisville, Kentucky, U.S.	
7	Win	7–0	Duke Sabedong	UD	10	Jun 26, 1961	19 years, 160 days	Las Vegas Convention Center, Winchester, Nevada, U.S.	
6	Win	6–0	LaMar Clark	KO	2 (8), 1:27	Apr 19, 1961	19 years, 92 days	Freedom Hall, Louisville, Kentucky, U.S.	
5	Win	5–0	Donnie Fleeman	RTD	6 (8)	Feb 21, 1961	19 years, 35 days	Municipal Auditorium, Miami Beach, Florida, U.S.	
4	Win	4–0	Jim Robinson	KO	1 (8), 1:34	Feb 7, 1961	19 years, 21 days	Convention Center, Miami Beach, Florida, U.S.	
3	Win	3–0	Tony Esperti	TKO	3 (8), 1:30	Jan 17, 1961	19 years, 0 days	Municipal Auditorium, Miami Beach, Florida, U.S.	
2	Win	2–0	Herb Siler	TKO	4 (8), 1:00	Dec 27, 1960	18 years, 345 days	Municipal Auditorium, Miami Beach, Florida, U.S.	
1	Win	1–0	Tunney Hunsaker	UD	6	Oct 29, 1960	18 years, 286 days	Freedom Hall, Louisville, Kentucky, U.S.	

== Exhibition boxing record ==
The following list does not include matches in which the opponent's name, location or exact date is unknown such as the one that took place in Genoa, Italy against Alonzo Johnson and Giorgio Bambini around 1971, his knockout victory over Alonzo Johnson in Doha, Qatar in 1971 (before The Fight of the Century), his two ten-round exhibitions against Roy "Tiger" Williams at Deer Lake in early 1975, his six-round exhibition on April 26, 1975, in Orlando, Florida, and the one that took place in Casablanca, Morocco around 1979. Exhibition contests do not count on a professional or amateur boxer's official record.

105 fights	2 wins	3 losses
By knockout	1	3
By decision	1	0
Draws	2	
Non-scored	98	

No.	Result	Record	Opponent	Type	Round, time	Date	Age	Location	Notes
105	Draw	2–3–2 (98)	Dave Semenko	PTS	3	Jun 12, 1983	41 years, 146 days	Northlands Coliseum, Edmonton, Alberta, Canada	
104	—N/a	2–3–1 (98)	Reiner Hartner	—N/a	?	Dec 4, 1982	40 years, 321 days	Al Maktoum Stadium, Dubai, U.A.E.	Non-scored bout
103	—N/a	2–3–1 (97)	Jimmy Ellis	—N/a	?	Dec 1, 1982	40 years, 318 days	Sheikh Zayed Stadium, Abu Dhabi, U.A.E.	Non-scored bout
102	—N/a	2–3–1 (96)	Jimmy Ellis	—N/a	5	Jan 31, 1980	38 years, 14 days	Madras, India	Non-scored bout
101	—N/a	2–3–1 (95)	Kaur Singh	—N/a	4	Jan 27, 1980	38 years, 10 days	National Stadium, New Delhi, India	Non-scored bout
100	—N/a	2–3–1 (94)	Lyle Alzado	—N/a	8	Jul 14, 1979	37 years, 178 days	Mile High Stadium, Denver, Colorado, U.S.	Non-scored bout
99	—N/a	2–3–1 (93)	Thomas F. X. Smith	—N/a	2	Jun 29, 1979	37 years, 163 days	Jersey City Armory, Jersey City, New Jersey, U.S.	Non-scored bout
98	—N/a	2–3–1 (92)	Brendan Byrne	—N/a	2	Jun 29, 1979	37 years, 163 days	Jersey City Armory, Jersey City, New Jersey, U.S.	Non-scored bout
97	—N/a	2–3–1 (91)	Jimmy Ellis	—N/a	5	Jun 7, 1979	37 years, 141 days	Odeon Theatre, Birmingham, England	Non-scored bout
96	—N/a	2–3–1 (90)	Karl Mildenberger	—N/a	2	Jun 4, 1979	37 years, 138 days	Grugahalle, Essen, West Germany	Non-scored bout
95	—N/a	2–3–1 (89)	Georg Butzbach	—N/a	3	Jun 4, 1979	37 years, 138 days	Grugahalle, Essen, West Germany	Non-scored bout
94	—N/a	2–3–1 (88)	John L. Gardner	—N/a	4	May 29, 1979	37 years, 132 days	Royal Albert Hall, London, England	Non-scored bout
93	—N/a	2–3–1 (87)	Jimmy Ellis	—N/a	5	May 27, 1979	37 years, 130 days	Randershallen, Randers, Denmark	Non-scored bout
92	—N/a	2–3–1 (86)	Alonzo Johnson	—N/a	5	May 27, 1979	37 years, 130 days	Randershallen, Randers, Denmark	Non-scored bout
91	—N/a	2–3–1 (85)	Jimmy Ellis	—N/a	2	Mar 12, 1979	37 years, 54 days	Providence Civic Center, Providence, Rhode Island, U.S.	Non-scored bout
90	—N/a	2–3–1 (84)	Alonzo Johnson	—N/a	2	Mar 12, 1979	37 years, 54 days	Providence Civic Center, Providence, Rhode Island, U.S.	Non-scored bout
89	—N/a	2–3–1 (83)	John "Dino" Denis	—N/a	2	Mar 12, 1979	37 years, 54 days	Providence Civic Center, Providence, Rhode Island, U.S.	Non-scored bout
88	—N/a	2–3–1 (82)	Luke Capuano	—N/a	4	Feb 28, 1979	37 years, 42 days	DePaul University Alumni Hall, Chicago, Illinois, U.S.	Non-scored bout
87	—N/a	2–3–1 (81)	Joe Bugner	—N/a	?	Feb 8, 1979	37 years, 22 days	Auckland, New Zealand	Non-scored bout
86	—N/a	2–3–1 (80)	Jimmy Ellis	—N/a	?	Feb 8, 1979	37 years, 22 days	Auckland, New Zealand	Non-scored bout
85	—N/a	2–3–1 (79)	Igor Vysotsky	—N/a	2	Jun 20, 1978	36 years, 154 days	Moscow, RSFSR, U.S.S.R.	Non-scored bout
84	—N/a	2–3–1 (78)	Evgeny Gorstkov	—N/a	2	Jun 20, 1978	36 years, 154 days	Moscow, RSFSR, U.S.S.R.	Non-scored bout
83	—N/a	2–3–1 (77)	Pyotr Zayev	—N/a	2	Jun 20, 1978	36 years, 154 days	Moscow, RSFSR, U.S.S.R.	Non-scored bout
82	—N/a	2–3–1 (76)	Burt Young	—N/a	?	May 8, 1978	36 years, 111 days	Olympic Auditorium, Los Angeles, California, U.S.	Non-scored bout
81	—N/a	2–3–1 (75)	Marvin Gaye	—N/a	?	May 8, 1978	36 years, 111 days	Olympic Auditorium, Los Angeles, California, U.S.	Non-scored bout
80	—N/a	2–3–1 (74)	Richard Pryor	—N/a	?	May 8, 1978	36 years, 111 days	Olympic Auditorium, Los Angeles, California, U.S.	Non-scored bout
79	—N/a	2–3–1 (73)	Sammy Davis Jr.	—N/a	?	May 8, 1978	36 years, 111 days	Olympic Auditorium, Los Angeles, California, U.S.	Non-scored bout
78	—N/a	2–3–1 (72)	Scott LeDoux	—N/a	5	Dec 2, 1977	35 years, 319 days	Auditorium Theatre, Chicago, Illinois, U.S.	Non-scored bout
77	—N/a	2–3–1 (71)	Bernardo Mercado	—N/a	5	Nov 14, 1977	35 years, 301 days	Santamaría Bullring, Bogotá, Colombia	Non-scored bout
76	Loss	2–3–1 (70)	Bruce Wells	KO	?	Aug 12, 1977	35 years, 207 days	South Shields, England	
75	—N/a	2–2–1 (70)	Michael Dokes	—N/a	3	Apr 16, 1977	35 years, 89 days	Miami Beach Convention Center, Miami Beach, Florida, U.S.	Non-scored bout
74	—N/a	2–2–1 (69)	Jody Ballard	—N/a	3	Apr 16, 1977	35 years, 89 days	Miami Beach Convention Center, Miami Beach, Florida, U.S.	Non-scored bout
73	—N/a	2–2–1 (68)	Ron Drinkwater	—N/a	2	Jan 29, 1977	35 years, 12 days	Hynes Auditorium, Boston, Massachusetts, U.S.	Non-scored bout
72	—N/a	2–2–1 (67)	Matt Ross	—N/a	2	Jan 29, 1977	35 years, 12 days	Hynes Auditorium, Boston, Massachusetts, U.S.	Non-scored bout
71	—N/a	2–2–1 (66)	Frank Kingston Smith	—N/a	1	Jan 29, 1977	35 years, 12 days	Hynes Auditorium, Boston, Massachusetts, U.S.	Non-scored bout
70	—N/a	2–2–1 (65)	Walter Haines	—N/a	1	Jan 29, 1977	35 years, 12 days	Hynes Auditorium, Boston, Massachusetts, U.S.	Non-scored bout
69	—N/a	2–2–1 (64)	Peter Fuller	—N/a	1	Jan 29, 1977	35 years, 12 days	Hynes Auditorium, Boston, Massachusetts, U.S.	Non-scored bout
68	—N/a	2–2–1 (63)	Jerry Huston Jr.	—N/a	2	Jan 29, 1977	35 years, 12 days	Hynes Auditorium, Boston, Massachusetts, U.S.	Non-scored bout
67	—N/a	2–2–1 (62)	Larry D. Rice	—N/a	1	Jun 27, 1976	34 years, 162 days	Camp Casey, Dongducheon, South Korea	Non-scored bout
66	—N/a	2–2–1 (61)	Gerald Noble	—N/a	1	Jun 27, 1976	34 years, 162 days	Camp Casey, Dongducheon, South Korea	Non-scored bout
65	Draw	2–2–1 (60)	Antonio Inoki	PTS	15	Jun 25, 1976	34 years, 160 days	Nippon Budokan, Tokyo, Japan	Under special "boxing-wrestling" rules
64	Win	2–2 (60)	Buddy Wolff	PTS	3	Jun 10, 1976	34 years, 145 days	International Amphitheater, Chicago, Illinois, U.S.	"Boxer vs. Wrestler"
63	Win	1–2 (60)	Kenny Jay	KO	2 (3) 1:29	Jun 10, 1976	34 years, 145 days	International Amphitheater, Chicago, Illinois, U.S.	"Boxer vs. Wrestler"
62	Loss	0–2 (60)	José Miguel Agrelot	KO	?	Feb 6, 1976	34 years, 20 days	Cancha Pepin Cestero, Bayamón, Puerto Rico	
61	—N/a	0–1 (60)	Clifford "Randy" Stephens	—N/a	3	Dec 6, 1975	33 years, 323 days	Dallas, Texas, U.S.	Non-scored bout
60	Loss	0–1 (59)	Bill Cunningham	KO	? (2)	Jun 6, 1975	33 years, 140 days	Olympia Stadium, Detroit, Michigan, U.S.	
59	—N/a	0–0 (59)	Robert Blackwell	—N/a	2	Jun 6, 1975	33 years, 140 days	Olympia Stadium, Detroit, Michigan, U.S.	Non-scored bout
58	—N/a	0–0 (58)	Johnny Hudson	—N/a	3	Jun 6, 1975	33 years, 140 days	Olympia Stadium, Detroit, Michigan, U.S.	Non-scored bout
57	—N/a	0–0 (57)	Boston Almon	—N/a	1	Jun 6, 1975	33 years, 140 days	Olympia Stadium, Detroit, Michigan, U.S.	Non-scored bout
56	—N/a	0–0 (56)	Ron Gentry	—N/a	2	Jun 6, 1975	33 years, 140 days	Olympia Stadium, Detroit, Michigan, U.S.	Non-scored bout
55	—N/a	0–0 (55)	Joe Bugner	—N/a	?	Dec 3, 1974	32 years, 320 days	Royal Albert Hall, London, England	Non-scored bout
54	—N/a	0–0 (54)	Roy "Cookie" Wallace	—N/a	4	Feb 23, 1973	31 years, 37 days	Moody Coliseum, University Park, Texas U.S.	Non-scored bout
53	—N/a	0–0 (53)	Alonzo Johnson	—N/a	2	Nov 28, 1972	30 years, 316 days	Salem-Roanoke Valley Civic Center, Salem, Virginia, U.S.	Non-scored bout
52	—N/a	0–0 (52)	John Jordan	—N/a	2	Nov 28, 1972	30 years, 316 days	Salem-Roanoke Valley Civic Center, Salem, Virginia, U.S.	Non-scored bout
51	—N/a	0–0 (51)	Jimmy Wingfield	—N/a	2	Nov 28, 1972	30 years, 316 days	Salem-Roanoke Valley Civic Center, Salem, Virginia, U.S.	Non-scored bout
50	—N/a	0–0 (50)	Charlie Boston	—N/a	2	Nov 28, 1972	30 years, 316 days	Salem-Roanoke Valley Civic Center, Salem, Virginia, U.S.	Non-scored bout
49	—N/a	0–0 (49)	Paul Raymond	—N/a	2	Oct 11, 1972	30 years, 268 days	Boston Garden, Boston, Massachusetts, U.S.	Non-scored bout
48	—N/a	0–0 (48)	Ray Anderson	—N/a	2	Oct 11, 1972	30 years, 268 days	Boston Garden, Boston, Massachusetts, U.S.	Non-scored bout
47	—N/a	0–0 (47)	Doug Kirk	—N/a	2	Oct 11, 1972	30 years, 268 days	Boston Garden, Boston, Massachusetts, U.S.	Non-scored bout
46	—N/a	0–0 (46)	Cliff McDonald	—N/a	2	Oct 11, 1972	30 years, 268 days	Boston Garden, Boston, Massachusetts, U.S.	Non-scored bout
45	—N/a	0–0 (45)	John "Dino" Denis	—N/a	2	Oct 11, 1972	30 years, 268 days	Boston Garden, Boston, Massachusetts, U.S.	Non-scored bout
44	—N/a	0–0 (44)	Gary Dee	—N/a	1	Aug 28, 1972	30 years, 224 days	Cleveland Arena, Cleveland, Ohio, U.S.	Non-scored bout
43	—N/a	0–0 (43)	Rodney Greene	—N/a	1	Aug 28, 1972	30 years, 224 days	Cleveland Arena, Cleveland, Ohio, U.S.	Non-scored bout
42	—N/a	0–0 (42)	Terry Daniels	—N/a	2	Aug 28, 1972	30 years, 224 days	Cleveland Arena, Cleveland, Ohio, U.S.	Non-scored bout
41	—N/a	0–0 (41)	Amos Johnson	—N/a	2	Aug 28, 1972	30 years, 224 days	Cleveland Arena, Cleveland, Ohio, U.S.	Non-scored bout
40	—N/a	0–0 (40)	Alonzo Johnson	—N/a	2	Aug 28, 1972	30 years, 224 days	Cleveland Arena, Cleveland, Ohio U.S.	Non-scored bout
39	—N/a	0–0 (39)	Ray Anderson	—N/a	2	Aug 24, 1972	30 years, 220 days	Baltimore Civic Center, Baltimore, Maryland U.S.	Non-scored bout
38	—N/a	0–0 (38)	Alonzo Johnson	—N/a	2	Aug 24, 1972	30 years, 220 days	Baltimore Civic Center, Baltimore, Maryland U.S.	Non-scored bout
37	—N/a	0–0 (37)	Gregorio Peralta	—N/a	8	Aug 1, 1972	30 years, 197 days	La Monumental, Barcelona, Spain	Non-scored bout
36	—N/a	0–0 (36)	Ba Sounkalo	—N/a	8	Jul 29, 1972	30 years, 194 days	Casablanca, Morocco	Non-scored bout
35	—N/a	0–0 (35)	Rudy Clay	—N/a	2	Jul 1, 1972	30 years, 166 days	Los Angeles, California, U.S.	Non-scored bout
34	—N/a	0–0 (34)	Charley James	—N/a	2	Jul 1, 1972	30 years, 166 days	Los Angeles, California, U.S.	Non-scored bout
33	—N/a	0–0 (33)	Billy Ryan	—N/a	2	Jul 1, 1972	30 years, 166 days	Los Angeles, California, U.S.	Non-scored bout
32	—N/a	0–0 (32)	Eddie Jones	—N/a	2	Jul 1, 1972	30 years, 166 days	Los Angeles, California, U.S.	Non-scored bout
31	—N/a	0–0 (31)	Lonnie Bennett	—N/a	2	Jul 1, 1972	30 years, 166 days	Los Angeles, California, U.S.	Non-scored bout
30	—N/a	0–0 (30)	Al Migliorato	—N/a	4	Feb 18, 1972	30 years, 32 days	Pittsburgh, Pennsylvania, U.S.	Non-scored bout
29	—N/a	0–0 (29)	Jeff Merritt	—N/a	5	Jan 28, 1972	30 years, 11 days	Pacific Coliseum, Vancouver, British Columbia, Canada	Non-scored bout
28	—N/a	0–0 (28)	Alonzo Johnson	—N/a	5	Jan 28, 1972	30 years, 11 days	Pacific Coliseum, Vancouver, British Columbia, Canada	Non-scored bout
27	—N/a	0–0 (27)	Miguel Ángel Páez	—N/a	5	Nov 6, 1971	29 years, 293 days	Atlanta Court, Buenos Aires, Argentina	Non-scored bout
26	—N/a	0–0 (26)	James Summerville	—N/a	5	Nov 6, 1971	29 years, 293 days	Atlanta Court, Buenos Aires, Argentina	Non-scored bout
25	—N/a	0–0 (25)	Cliff Field	—N/a	2	Oct 19, 1971	29 years, 275 days	Royal Albert Hall, London, England	Non-scored bout
24	—N/a	0–0 (24)	Graham Sines	—N/a	2	Oct 19, 1971	29 years, 275 days	Royal Albert Hall, London, England	Non-scored bout
23	—N/a	0–0 (23)	Johnny Frankham	—N/a	2	Oct 19, 1971	29 years, 275 days	Royal Albert Hall, London, England	Non-scored bout
22	—N/a	0–0 (22)	Alonzo Johnson	—N/a	2	Oct 19, 1971	29 years, 275 days	Royal Albert Hall, London, England	Non-scored bout
21	—N/a	0–0 (21)	Eddie Brooks	—N/a	2	Aug 22, 1971	29 years, 217 days	Queen's Park Oval, Port of Spain, Trinidad and Tobago	Non-scored bout
20	—N/a	0–0 (20)	Lancer Johnson	—N/a	4	Aug 22, 1971	29 years, 217 days	Queen's Park Oval, Port of Spain, Trinidad and Tobago	Non-scored bout
19	—N/a	0–0 (19)	Eddie Brooks	—N/a	4	Aug 21, 1971	29 years, 216 days	Nuevo Circo, Caracas, Venezuela	Non-scored bout
18	—N/a	0–0 (18)	Lancer Johnson	—N/a	4	Aug 21, 1971	29 years, 216 days	Nuevo Circo, Caracas, Venezuela	Non-scored bout
17	—N/a	0–0 (17)	Rufus Braswell	—N/a	3	Jun 25, 1971	29 years, 159 days	Hara Arena, Dayton, Ohio, U.S.	Non-scored bout
16	—N/a	0–0 (16)	Eddie Brooks	—N/a	3	Jun 25, 1971	29 years, 159 days	Hara Arena, Dayton, Ohio, U.S.	Non-scored bout
15	—N/a	0–0 (15)	J.D. McCauley	—N/a	2	Jun 25, 1971	29 years, 159 days	Hara Arena, Dayton, Ohio U.S.	Non-scored bout
14	—N/a	0–0 (14)	George Hill	—N/a	2	Sep 2, 1970	28 years, 228 days	Archer Hall Gymnasium, Atlanta, Georgia, U.S.	Non-scored bout
13	—N/a	0–0 (13)	Johnny Hudgins	—N/a	2	Sep 2, 1970	28 years, 228 days	Archer Hall Gymnasium, Atlanta, Georgia, U.S.	Non-scored bout
12	—N/a	0–0 (12)	Rufus Braswell	—N/a	2	Sep 2, 1970	28 years, 228 days	Archer Hall Gymnasium, Atlanta, Georgia, U.S.	Non-scored bout
11	—N/a	0–0 (11)	Orvill Qualls	—N/a	3	Jun 15, 1967	25 years, 149 days	Detroit, Michigan, U.S.	Non-scored bout
10	—N/a	0–0 (10)	Al "Blue" Lewis	—N/a	3	Jun 15, 1967	25 years, 149 days	Detroit, Michigan, U.S.	Non-scored bout
9	—N/a	0–0 (9)	Doug Jones	—N/a	6	Oct 27, 1966	24 years, 283 days	Freedom Hall, Louisville, Kentucky, U.S.	Non-scored bout
8	—N/a	0–0 (8)	Cody Jones	—N/a	4	Aug 20, 1965	23 years, 215 days	Paisley, Scotland	Non-scored bout
7	—N/a	0–0 (7)	Jimmy Ellis	—N/a	4	Aug 20, 1965	23 years, 215 days	London, England	Non-scored bout
6	—N/a	0–0 (6)	Jimmy Ellis	—N/a	2	Aug 16, 1965	23 years, 211 days	Nya Ullevi, Gothenburg, Sweden	Non-scored bout
5	—N/a	0–0 (5)	Cody Jones	—N/a	2	Aug 16, 1965	23 years, 211 days	Nya Ullevi, Gothenburg, Sweden	Non-scored bout
4	—N/a	0–0 (4)	Cody Jones	—N/a	3	Jul 31, 1965	23 years, 195 days	San Juan, Puerto Rico	Non-scored bout
3	—N/a	0–0 (3)	Jimmy Ellis	—N/a	3	Jul 31, 1965	23 years, 195 days	San Juan, Puerto Rico	Non-scored bout
2	—N/a	0–0 (2)	Cody Jones	—N/a	4	Jul 28, 1965	23 years, 192 days	The Palace Theatre, Belize City, British Honduras	Non-scored bout
1	—N/a	0–0 (1)	Ingemar Johansson	—N/a	3	Feb 6, 1961	19 years, 20 days	Miami Beach, Florida U.S.	Non-scored bout

== Viewership ==
Muhammad Ali's fights were some of the world's most-watched television broadcasts, setting television viewership records. Some of his most-watched fights drew an estimated 1–2 billion viewers worldwide between 1974 and 1980, and were the world's most-watched live television broadcasts at the time.

Date	Fight(s)	Region(s)	Viewers	Source(s)
February 25, 1964	Sonny Liston vs. Cassius Clay	Western world	165,950,000	
February 25, 1964	Sonny Liston vs. Cassius Clay	Europe	165,000,000	
February 25, 1964	Sonny Liston vs. Cassius Clay	United States (PPV)	950,000	
May 25, 1965	Muhammad Ali vs. Sonny Liston II	Worldwide	80,000,000	
May 25, 1965	Muhammad Ali vs. Sonny Liston II	United Kingdom	7,000,000	
May 21, 1966	Muhammad Ali vs. Henry Cooper II	Worldwide	200,000,000	
May 21, 1966	Muhammad Ali vs. Henry Cooper II	United Kingdom	21,000,000	
May 21, 1966	Muhammad Ali vs. Henry Cooper II	United States	20,000,000	
March 8, 1971	Muhammad Ali vs. Joe Frazier (Fight of the Century)	Worldwide	300,000,000	
March 8, 1971	Muhammad Ali vs. Joe Frazier (Fight of the Century)	United Kingdom	27,500,000	
March 8, 1971	Muhammad Ali vs. Joe Frazier (Fight of the Century)	South Korea	2,000,000	
February 14, 1973	Muhammad Ali vs. Joe Bugner	United Kingdom	20,000,000	
October 30, 1974	Muhammad Ali vs. George Foreman (The Rumble in the Jungle)	Worldwide	1,000,000,000	
October 30, 1974	Muhammad Ali vs. George Foreman (The Rumble in the Jungle)	United Kingdom	26,000,000	
May 16, 1975	Muhammad Ali vs. Ron Lyle	United States	50,000,000	
February 20, 1976	Muhammad Ali vs. Jean-Pierre Coopman	United States	40,000,000	
April 30, 1976	Muhammad Ali vs. Jimmy Young	United States	33,700,000	
May 24, 1976	Muhammad Ali vs. Richard Dunn	United States	65,000,000	
June 26, 1976	Muhammad Ali vs. Antonio Inoki	Worldwide	1,400,000,000	
June 26, 1976	Muhammad Ali vs. Antonio Inoki	Japan	54,000,000	
May 16, 1977	Muhammad Ali vs. Alfredo Evangelista	United States	50,000,000	
September 29, 1977	Muhammad Ali vs. Earnie Shavers	United States	70,000,000	
February 15, 1978	Muhammad Ali vs. Leon Spinks	United States	70,000,000	
September 27, 1978	Leon Spinks vs. Muhammad Ali II	Worldwide	2,000,000,000	
September 27, 1978	Leon Spinks vs. Muhammad Ali II	United States	90,000,000	
	Total viewership	Worldwide	5,500,000,000	

=== Pay-per-view bouts ===
The earliest form of pay-per-view boxing telecasts was closed-circuit television, also known as theatre television, where fights were telecast live to a select number of venues, mostly theaters, where viewers paid for tickets to watch the fight live. The use of closed-circuit for boxing telecasts peaked in popularity with Ali in the 1960s and 1970s. Most of Ali's closed-circuit telecasts were handled by his promotion company Main Bout. The following table lists known ticket sales/buys for Ali fights at closed-circuit venues/theaters:

Closed-circuit theatre television
Date	Fight	Billing	Region(s)	Buys	Revenue	Revenue (inflation)
March 13, 1963	Cassius Clay vs. Doug Jones	Clay vs. Jones	United States	150,000	$500,000	$5,300,000
February 25, 1964	Sonny Liston vs. Cassius Clay	Greatest Fight In History	United States	700,000	$5,000,000	$51,900,000
May 25, 1965	Muhammad Ali vs. Sonny Liston II	Champion vs. Ex-Champion	United States	630,000	$4,300,000	$43,900,000
November 22, 1965	Muhammad Ali vs. Floyd Patterson	Ali vs. Patterson	United States	500,000	$4,000,000	$40,900,000
March 29, 1966	Muhammad Ali vs. George Chuvalo	The Second Reckoning	United States	46,000	$230,000	$2,280,000
May 21, 1966	Muhammad Ali vs. Henry Cooper II	Friday Night of the Century	England	40,000	$1,500,000	$14,900,000
August 6, 1966	Muhammad Ali vs. Brian London	Ali vs. British Bulldog	England	38,000	$300,000	$3,000,000
November 14, 1966	Muhammad Ali vs. Cleveland Williams	Ali vs. Williams	United States	500,000	$3,750,000	$38,300,000
February 6, 1967	Muhammad Ali vs. Ernie Terrell	The Battle of Champions	United States	800,000	$4,000,000	$39,700,000
January 20, 1970	Muhammad Ali vs. Rocky Marciano	The Super Fight	Western world		$5,000,000	$41,500,000
January 20, 1970	Muhammad Ali vs. Rocky Marciano	The Super Fight	United States	500,000	$2,500,000	$20,700,000
October 26, 1970	Muhammad Ali vs. Jerry Quarry	Return of the Champion	United States	630,000	$3,500,000	$29,000,000
March 8, 1971	Muhammad Ali vs. Joe Frazier	Fight of the Century	Anglosphere	2,590,000	$45,750,000	$400,000,000
March 8, 1971	Muhammad Ali vs. Joe Frazier	Fight of the Century	United States	2,500,000	$45,000,000	$358,000,000
March 8, 1971	Muhammad Ali vs. Joe Frazier	Fight of the Century	London	90,000	$750,000	$6,000,000
February 14, 1973	Muhammad Ali vs. Joe Bugner	Fight of a Lifetime	United Kingdom	30,000	$300,000	$2,200,000
January 28, 1974	Muhammad Ali vs. Joe Frazier II	Super Fight II	United States	1,100,000	$17,000,000	$111,000,000
October 30, 1974	Muhammad Ali vs. George Foreman	The Rumble in the Jungle	Worldwide	50,000,000	$100,000,000	$650,000,000
October 30, 1974	Muhammad Ali vs. George Foreman	The Rumble in the Jungle	United States	3,000,000	$60,000,000	$391,700,000
March 24, 1975	Muhammad Ali vs. Chuck Wepner	Chance of a Lifetime	United States	500,000	$5,000,000	$29,900,000
October 1, 1975	Muhammad Ali vs. Joe Frazier III	Thrilla in Manila	Worldwide	100,000,000	$100,000,000	$600,000,000
October 1, 1975	Muhammad Ali vs. Joe Frazier III	Thrilla in Manila	United States	3,000,000	$60,000,000	$359,000,000
June 26, 1976	Muhammad Ali vs. Antonio Inoki	War of the Worlds	United States	2,000,000	$20,000,000	$110,000,000
September 28, 1976	Muhammad Ali vs. Ken Norton III	Ali's Revenge	United States	1,500,000	$33,500,000	$189,500,000
March 31, 1985	WrestleMania I	WrestleMania	United States	1,000,000	$10,000,000	$29,900,000
	Total sales		Worldwide	162,154,000	$364,380,000	$2,016,420,000

Professional boxing was introduced to pay-per-view home cable television with several Muhammad Ali fights, especially the Thrilla in Manila fight between Ali and Joe Frazier in 1975, which was transmitted through HBO. Ali had several fights broadcast on early pay-per-view home television:

Pay-per-view home television
Date	Fight	Billing	Network	Region(s)	Buys	Revenue	Revenue (inflation)
March 13, 1963	Cassius Clay vs. Doug Jones	Clay vs. Jones		United States			
February 25, 1964	Sonny Liston vs. Cassius Clay	Greatest Fight In History	WHCT	United States	250,000	$750,000	$7,800,000
November 22, 1965	Muhammad Ali vs. Floyd Patterson	Ali vs. Patterson		United States		$150,000	$1,500,000
May 21, 1966	Muhammad Ali vs. Henry Cooper II	Friday Night of the Century	Pay TV	United Kingdom	40,000	$448,004	$3,570,000
November 14, 1966	Muhammad Ali vs. Ernie Terrell	The Battle of Champions	Hartford	United States			
October 1, 1975	Muhammad Ali vs. Joe Frazier III	Thrilla in Manila	HBO	United States	500,000	$10,000,000	$59,800,000
December 11, 1981	Muhammad Ali vs. Trevor Berbick	Drama in Bahama	SelectTV	United States			
	Total sales				790,000	$11,348,004	$62,640,000

== See also ==
- Muhammad Ali
- List of career achievements by Muhammad Ali
- List of heavyweight boxing champions
- List of WBA world champions
- List of WBC world champions
- List of The Ring world champions
- List of undisputed boxing champions
- Notable boxing families

== Notes ==
Sporting positions
Amateur boxing titles
Previous: Kent Green	U.S. Golden Gloves light heavyweight champion 1959	Next: Jefferson Davis
Previous: Sylvester Banks	U.S. light heavyweight champion 1959, 1960	Next: Bob Christopherson
Previous: Jimmy Jones	U.S. Golden Gloves heavyweight champion 1960	Next: Al Jenkins
Regional boxing titles
Vacant Title last held by Leotis Martin	NABF heavyweight champion December 17, 1970 – March 8, 1971; Failed to win world title	Vacant Title next held by George Foreman
Vacant Title last held by George Foreman	NABF heavyweight champion July 26, 1971 – March 31, 1973	Succeeded by Ken Norton
Preceded by Ken Norton	NABF heavyweight champion September 10, 1973 – October 30, 1974; Won world title	Vacant Title next held by Ken Norton
World boxing titles
Preceded by Sonny Liston	WBA heavyweight champion February 25, 1964 – September 14, 1964; Stripped	Vacant Title next held by Ernie Terrell
Preceded by Sonny Liston	WBC heavyweight champion February 25, 1964 – March 11, 1969; Stripped	Vacant Title next held by Joe Frazier
Preceded by Sonny Liston	The Ring heavyweight champion February 25, 1964 – March 13, 1970; Stripped	Vacant Title next held by Joe Frazier
Preceded by Sonny Liston	Undisputed heavyweight champion February 25, 1964 – September 14, 1964; Titles fragmented	Vacant Title next held by Himself
Preceded by Ernie Terrell	WBA heavyweight champion February 6, 1967 – April 28, 1967; Stripped	Vacant Title next held by Jimmy Ellis
Vacant Title last held by Himself	Undisputed heavyweight champion February 6, 1967 – April 28, 1967; Titles fragmented	Vacant Title next held by Joe Frazier
Preceded by George Foreman	WBA heavyweight champion October 30, 1974 – February 15, 1978	Succeeded by Leon Spinks
Preceded by George Foreman	WBC heavyweight champion October 30, 1974 – February 15, 1978	Succeeded by Leon Spinks
Preceded by George Foreman	The Ring heavyweight champion October 30, 1974 – February 15, 1978	Succeeded by Leon Spinks
Preceded by George Foreman	Undisputed heavyweight champion October 30, 1974 – February 15, 1978	Succeeded by Leon Spinks
Preceded by Leon Spinks	WBA heavyweight champion September 15, 1978 – July 3, 1979; Vacated	Vacant Title next held by John Tate
Preceded by Leon Spinks	The Ring heavyweight champion September 15, 1978 – July 4, 1979; Retired	Vacant Title next held by Larry Holmes
Awards
Inaugural award	United Press International; Athlete of the Year; 1974	Next: João Carlos de Oliveira
Previous: Olga Korbut	BBC Overseas; Sports Personality of the Year; 1973, 1974	Next: Arthur Ashe
Previous: Niki Lauda	BBC Overseas; Sports Personality of the Year; 1978	Next: Björn Borg
Heavyweight status
Previous: Ernie Terrell	Oldest living world champion December 16, 2014 – June 3, 2016	Next: George Foreman
Olympic Games
Previous: Haakon, Crown Prince of Norway	Final Olympic torchbearer Atlanta 1996	Next: Midori Ito
Previous: Antonio Rebollo	Final Summer Olympic torchbearer Atlanta 1996	Next: Cathy Freeman
