= Cassius Clay vs. George Logan =

1962 boxing match

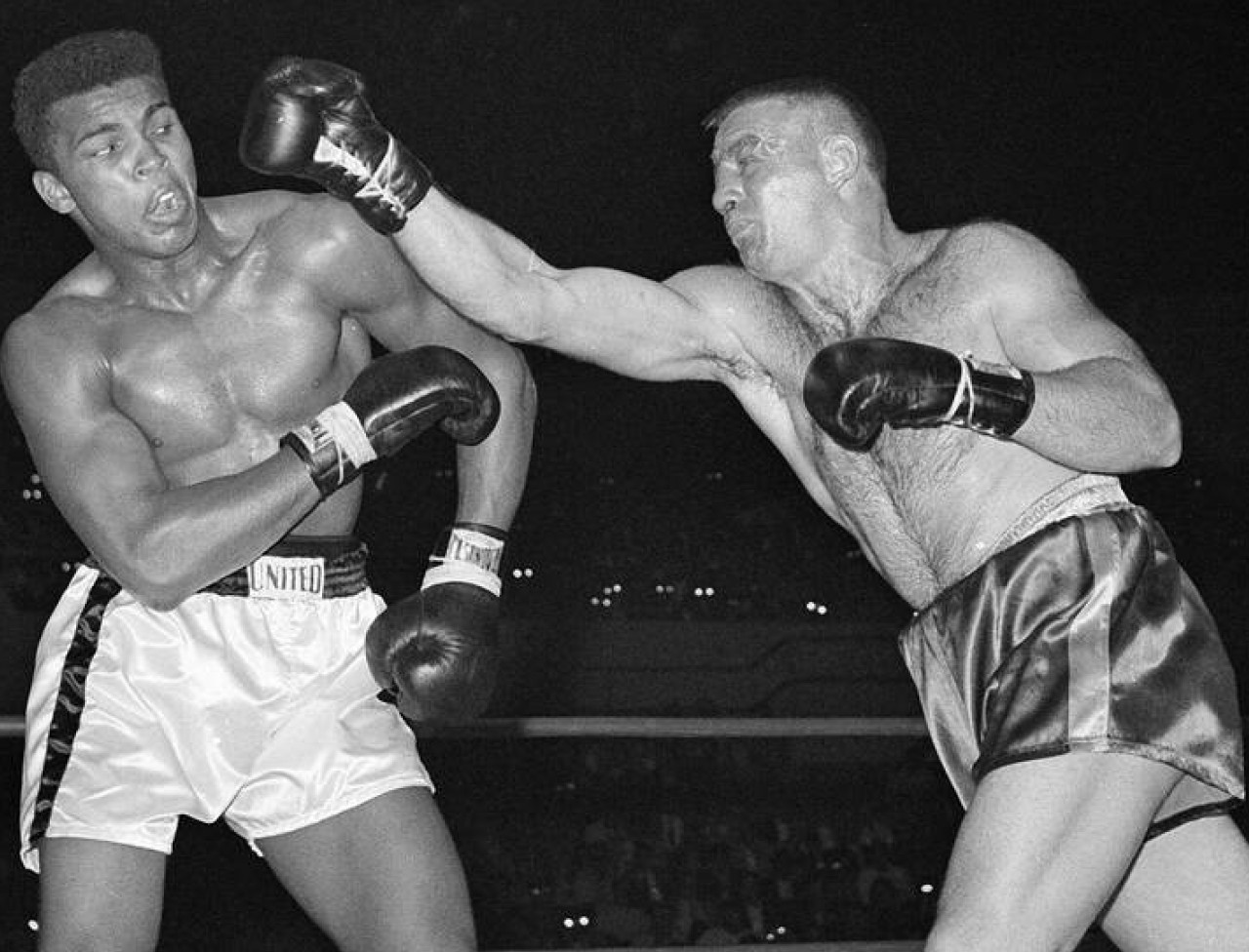
- Date: April 23, 1962
- Venue: Los Angeles Memorial Sports Arena, Los Angeles, California

Tale of the tape
Boxer	(United States) Cassius Clay	(United States) George Logan
Nickname	"The Louisville Lip"	
Hometown	Louisville, Kentucky	Boise, Idaho
Purse	$7,500	$4,000
Pre-fight record	12–0 (9 KO)	24–7–1 (13 KO)
Age	20 years, 3 months	25 years, 8 months
Height	6 ft 3 in (191 cm)	6 ft 1 in (185 cm)
Weight	196 1/2 lb (89 kg)	205 lb (93 kg)
Style	Orthodox	Orthodox
Recognition	The Ring; No. 10 Ranked Heavyweight; 1960 Olympic light heavyweight Gold Medalist	

Result
- Clay defeated Powell by 4th round TKO

Cassius Clay vs. George Logan was a professional boxing match contested on April 23, 1962.

== Background ==
Cassius Clay fought a ten-round boxing match with George Logan in Los Angeles in April 1962. Clay was a 4 to 1 favorite going into the bout.

== The fight ==
Clay won the fight through a technical knockout after the referee stopped the fight in the fourth round. This was Clay's 13th professional victory and before the fight Jack Dempsey predicted he would win the title. Logan sustained a serious eye injury during the bout that eventually led to its stoppage.

== Aftermath ==
Logan later claimed his cornermen told him to use low blows against Clay but he refused. Logan was later a truant officer and a police officer in his native state of Idaho.

== Undercard ==
Confirmed bouts:

Preceded by vs. Don Warner	Cassius Clay's bouts 23 April 1962	Succeeded by vs. Billy Daniels
Preceded by vs. Bob Cleroux	George Logan's bouts 23 April 1962	Succeeded by vs. Billy Fields
