= Cassius Clay vs. Charlie Powell =

1963 boxing match

- Date: January 24, 1963
- Venue: Civic Arena, Pittsburgh, Pennsylvania

Tale of the tape
Boxer	(United States) Cassius Clay	(United States) Charlie Powell
Nickname	"The Louisville Lip"	"Chuck"
Hometown	Louisville, Kentucky	San Diego, California
Pre-fight record	16–0 (13 KO)	26–3–3 (15 KO)
Age	21 years	30 years, 9 months
Height	6 ft 3 in (191 cm)	6 ft 4 in (193 cm)
Weight	205 lb (93 kg)	214 lb (97 kg)
Style	Orthodox	Orthodox
Recognition	The Ring; No. 2 Ranked Heavyweight; 1960 Olympic light heavyweight Gold Medalist	

Result
- Clay defeated Powell by 3rd round KO

Cassius Clay vs. Charlie Powell was a professional boxing match contested on January 24, 1963.

== Background ==
Clay was a 4 to 1 favourite.

== The fight ==
Clay won the bout by knocking out Powell in the third round.

== Aftermath ==
The gross gate was $55,782, and the net was $47,360. 10% of the net went to a fund for the families of 37 men who were killed in a mine explosion the previous month.

== Undercard ==
Confirmed bouts:

Preceded by vs. Archie Moore	Cassius Clay's bouts 24 January 1963	Succeeded by vs. Doug Jones
Preceded by vs. Dave Furch	Charlie Powell's bouts 24 January 1963	Succeeded by vs. Dave Furch II
