= Muhammad Ali vs. Henry Cooper II =

Boxing match

- Date: 21 May 1966
- Venue: Arsenal Stadium, Islington, London, UK
- Title(s) on the line: WBC, NYSAC, and The Ring heavyweight titles

Tale of the tape
Boxer	(United States) Muhammad Ali	(United Kingdom) Henry Cooper
Nickname	"The Greatest".	"Our 'Enry"
Hometown	Louisville, Kentucky, U.S.	Lambeth, London, UK
Pre-fight record	23–0 (18 KO)	33–11–1 (22 KO)
Age	24 years, 4 months	32 years
Height	6 ft 3 in (191 cm)	6 ft 1 1/2 in (187 cm)
Weight	207 lb (94 kg)	185 lb (84 kg)
Style	Orthodox	Orthodox
Recognition	WBC, NYSAC, and The Ring; Heavyweight Champion	British and Commonwealth; Heavyweight Champion

Result
- Ali won via 6th roundTKO

Muhammad Ali vs. Henry Cooper II was a professional boxing match contested on 21 May 1966, for the WBC, NYSAC, and The Ring championship.

== Background ==
On 16 April 1966 Muhammad Ali signed to make the fourth defence of the title he had won against Sonny Liston in February 1964, against Henry Cooper. Cooper had faced Ali in the bout immediately prior to him becoming the champion and had famously knocked down the American with a trademark left hook at the end of the fourth round, with trainer Angelo Dundee appearing to possibly pop an ampule of smelling salts under Ali's nose (which would have been a disqualifying offense if he had been caught).

The bout was fought at Arsenal Stadium, where it drew a live audience of 46,000 spectators. The fight held the record for the largest live audience at a British boxing event, up until Joe Calzaghe vs. Mikkel Kessler drew 55,000 spectators in 2007. It was the first world heavyweight title bout to be held in the United Kingdom since Tommy Burns vs. Jem Roche in March 1908, 58 years earlier.

== The fight ==
Ali stayed away from Cooper for the first three rounds as Cooper continued to stalk him. In the next two rounds, Ali allowed Cooper to come closer; but then in the sixth round the fight was again stopped because of a cut over Cooper's eye which started bleeding profusely.

The Associated Press scored the first two rounds for Cooper, the third even, and gave Ali the fourth and fifth.

== Aftermath ==
Reflecting on the fight Cooper observed:

I still had the style that could upset him. But I must say that he's a quick learner, Ali. The second fight he learned. He would stand no nonsense. I could not mess around inside. I've never been held so bleedin' tight in my life. In the second fight, I think that's all I can remember... Whenever I got close to him, he held me. It was just like being in a vice. He held me, and when the referee said 'Break,' he made sure he pushed me back, and he took a right step back. He'd learned well from the first experience.

== Undercard ==
Confirmed bouts:

== Broadcasting ==
Country	Broadcaster
Philippines	CBN 9
United Kingdom	Pay TV (Live) / BBC (Delayed)
United States	ABC

=== Viewership and revenue ===
On pay-per-view closed-circuit television, the fight drew 40,000 buys in England, where it was shown in 16 theaters, grossing $1.5 million ($14,884,615 with inflation). The fight was telecast at Odeon Cinemas. On pay-per-view home television, the fight drew 40,000 buys, as the first fight on Britain's experimental Pay TV service, at a price of £4, grossing £160,000 ($448,004), equivalent to £2,490,721 ($3,746,853) with inflation.

The fight was later aired on BBC, where it was watched by 21 million viewers in the United Kingdom. In the United States, the fight was broadcast live to 20 million viewers via satellite.

Preceded by vs. George Chuvalo	Muhammad Ali's bouts 21 May 1966	Succeeded by vs. Brian London
Preceded by vs. Jefferson Davis	Henry Cooper's bouts 21 May 1966	Succeeded by vs. Floyd Patterson
