= Cassius Clay vs. Don Warner =

1962 boxing match

- Date: February 28, 1962
- Venue: Miami Beach Convention Center, Miami Beach, Florida

Tale of the tape
| Boxer | (United States) Cassius Clay | (United States) Don Warner |
| Nickname | "The Louisville Lip" | |
| Hometown | Louisville, Kentucky | Philadelphia, Pennsylvania |
| Pre-fight record | 11–0 (8 KO) | 12–6–2 (11 KO) |
| Age | 20 years, 1 month | 22 years, 6 months |
| Height | 6 ft 3 in (191 cm) | 6 ft 0 in (183 cm) |
| Weight | 195 lb (88 kg) | 189 1/2 lb (86 kg) |
| Style | Orthodox | Orthodox |
| Recognition | 1960 Olympic light heavyweight Gold Medalist | |

Result
- Clay defeated Warner by 4th round TKO

Cassius Clay vs. Don Warner was a professional boxing match contested on February 28, 1962.

== Background ==
Clay fought a ten-round boxing match with Don Warner in Miami Beach.

Interviewer: I heard you met Don Warner last night.
Cassius Clay: Yeah, he didn't were too friendly.
Interviewer: What do you mean with that?
Cassius Clay: He didn't shake my hand.
Interviewer: What are you going to do about that?
Cassius Clay: Now he must fall.

== The fight ==
Clay won the fight through a technical knockout after the referee stopped the fight in the fourth round.

== Aftermath ==
Warner would later serve as a sparring partner for Joe Frazier.

== Undercard ==
Confirmed bouts:

| Preceded by vs. Sonny Banks | Cassius Clay's bouts 28 February 1962 | Succeeded by vs. George Logan |
| Preceded by vs. Orie Paschall | Don Warner's bouts 28 February 1962 | Succeeded by vs. Orie Paschall |
