= Cassius Clay vs. Billy Daniels =

1962 boxing match

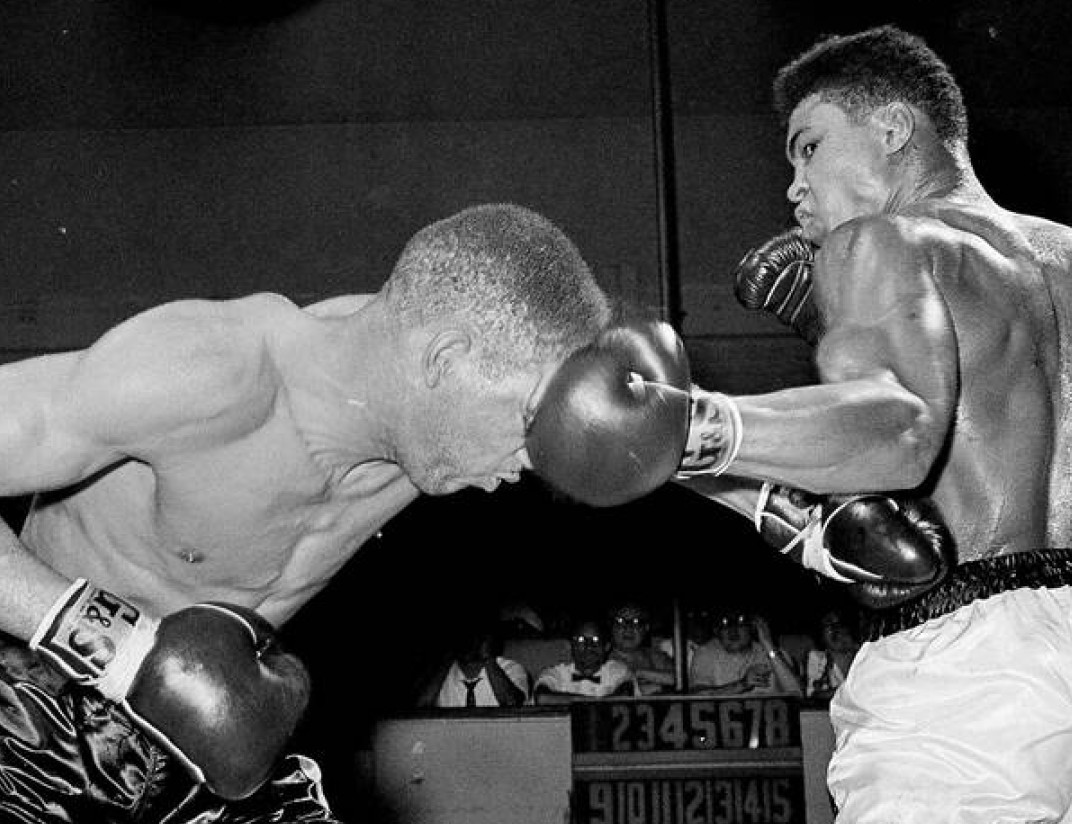
- Date: May 19, 1962
- Venue: St. Nicholas Arena, New York City, New York

Tale of the tape
Boxer	(United States) Cassius Clay	(United States) Billy Daniels
Nickname	"The Louisville Lip"	"The Barber"
Hometown	Louisville, Kentucky	New York City, New York
Pre-fight record	13–0 (10 KO)	16–0 (6 KO)
Age	20 years, 4 months	24 years, 8 months
Height	6 ft 3 in (191 cm)	6 ft 4 in (193 cm)
Weight	196 lb (89 kg)	189 lb (86 kg)
Style	Orthodox	Orthodox
Recognition	NBA; No. 7 Ranked Heavyweight; The Ring; No. 9 Ranked Heavyweight	

Result
- Clay defeated Daniels by 7th round TKO

Cassius Clay vs. Billy Daniels was a professional boxing match contested on May 19, 1962.

== Background ==
Cassius Clay fought fellow undefeated prospect Billy Daniels in a ten-round boxing match at St. Nicholas Arena in New York City. Clay, who was a 5-1 favourite going into the bout, said in build up "Daniels will fall in five".

== The fight ==
Clay won the fight through a technical knockout when the referee stopped the fight in the seventh round. The fight featured a series of clinches and calls of "break" from the referee. Clay was ahead on points when the referee stopped the fight after a cut opened above Daniels' left eyebrow. At the time of the stoppage, referee Mark Conn had Clay ahead 5–1, and judges Artie Aidala and Leo Birnbaum had him in front 4–2.

== Aftermath ==
Nine days after the bout the Arena closed its doors for good.

== Undercard ==
Confirmed bouts:

Preceded by vs. George Logan	Cassius Clay's bouts 19 May 1962	Succeeded by vs. Alejandro Lavorante
Preceded by vs. Claude Chapman	Billy Daniels's bouts 19 May 1962	Succeeded by vs. Mike DeJohn
