= Cassius Clay vs. Alejandro Lavorante =

1962 boxing match

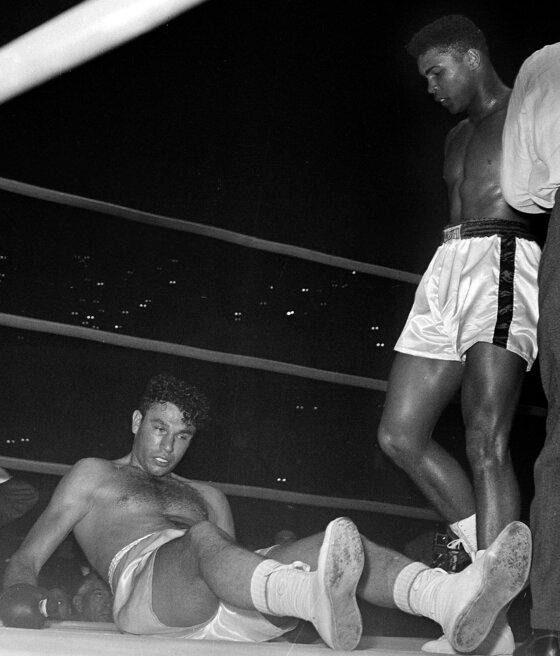
- Date: July 20, 1962
- Venue: Los Angeles Memorial Sports Arena, Los Angeles, California, U.S.

Tale of the tape
Boxer	(United States) Cassius Clay	(Argentina) Alejandro Lavorante
Nickname	"The Louisville Lip"	
Hometown	Louisville, Kentucky, U.S.	Mendoza, Province of Mendoza, Argentina
Pre-fight record	14–0 (11 KO)	19–3 (15 KO)
Age	20 years, 6 months	26 years, 2 months
Height	6 ft 3 in (191 cm)	6 ft 3 1/2 in (192 cm)
Weight	199 lb (90 kg)	208 lb (94 kg)
Style	Orthodox	Orthodox
Recognition	1960 Olympic light heavyweight Gold Medalist	

Result
- Clay defeated Powell by 5th round KO

Cassius Clay vs. Alejandro Lavorante was a professional boxing match contested on July 20, 1962.

== Background ==
Clay fought the Argentine Lavorante in a ten-round match in the Los Angeles Memorial Sports Arena on July 20, 1962.

== The fight ==
Clay won the bout by knocking out Lavorante in the fifth round.

== Undercard ==
Confirmed bouts:

Preceded by vs. Billy Daniels	Cassius Clay's bouts 20 July 1962	Succeeded by vs. Archie Moore
Preceded by vs. Archie Moore	Alejandro Lavorante's bouts 20 July 1962	Succeeded by vs. John Riggins
