= Cassius Clay vs. Sonny Banks =

1962 boxing match

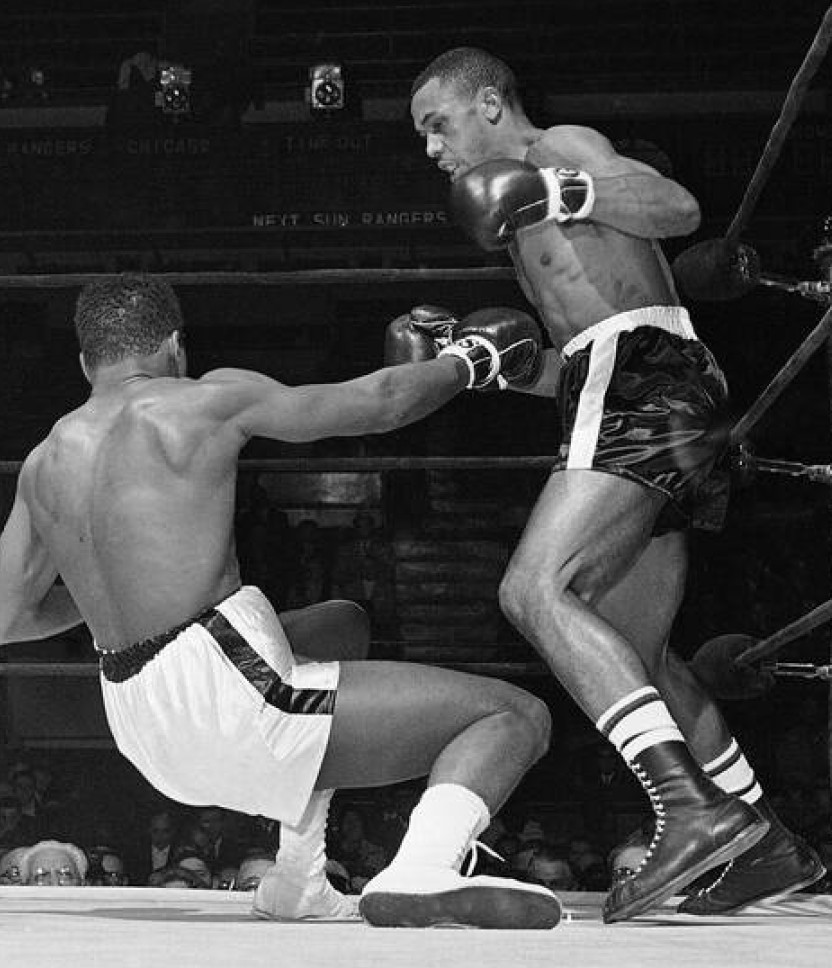
- Ali knocked down by Banks
- Date: February 10, 1962
- Venue: Madison Square Garden, New York City, New York

Tale of the tape
| Boxer | (United States) Cassius Clay | (United States) Sonny Banks |
| Nickname | "The Louisville Lip" | |
| Hometown | Louisville, Kentucky | Birmingham, Mississippi |
| Pre-fight record | 10–0 (7 KO) | 10–2 (9 KO) |
| Age | 20 years | 21 years, 7 months |
| Height | 6 ft 3 in (191 cm) | 6 ft 2 in (188 cm) |
| Weight | 194 lb (88 kg) | 191 lb (87 kg) |
| Style | Orthodox | Orthodox |
| Recognition | The Ring; No. 9 Ranked Heavyweight; 1960 Olympic light heavyweight Gold Medallist | |

Result
- Clay won by TKO in 4rd round (0:26)

Cassius Clay vs. Sonny Banks was a professional boxing match contested on February 10, 1962.

== Background ==
Clay, who was a 5 to 1 favourite going into the bout, predicted a fourth round stoppage.

== The fight ==
Clay won the fight through a technical knockout when the referee stopped the fight in the fourth round.

The event is remembered for being the first professional boxing match in which Ali was officially knocked down in the ring by his boxing opponent. (Note: Although it has gone down as a knockdown in the records, some commentators opine that Ali had slipped on water splashed in a corner during this fight.)

== Aftermath ==
Speaking after the bout Clay said "As you know, I think that I'm the greatest and I'm not supposed to be on the floor, so I had to get up and put him on out, in four as I predicted."

== Undercard ==
Confirmed bouts:

== Broadcasting ==
| Country | Broadcaster |
|---|---|
| United Kingdom | BBC |

== Notes ==
| Preceded by vs. Willi Besmanoff | Cassius Clay's bouts 10 February 1962 | Succeeded by vs. Don Warner |
| Preceded by vs. Clay Thomas | Sonny Banks's bouts 10 February 1962 | Succeeded by vs. Young Jack Johnson |
