= Archie Moore vs. Cassius Clay =

1962 boxing match

- Date: November 15, 1962
- Venue: Los Angeles Memorial Sports Arena, Los Angeles, California

Tale of the tape
Boxer	(United States) Archie Moore	(United States) Cassius Clay
Nickname	"The Old Mongoose"	"The Louisville Lip"
Hometown	Benoit, Mississippi	Louisville, Kentucky
Purse	$75,000	$40,000
Pre-fight record	185–22–10 (1) (131 KO)	15–0 (12 KO)
Age	48 years, 11 months	20 years, 9 months
Height	5 ft 11 in (180 cm)	6 ft 3 in (191 cm)
Weight	192 lb (87 kg)	204 lb (93 kg)
Style	Orthodox	Orthodox
Recognition	Former World Light heavyweight champion	1960 Olympic light heavyweight Gold Medalist

Result
- Clay won by TKO in the 4th round (1:35)

Archie Moore vs. Cassius Clay was a professional boxing match contested on November 15, 1962.

The fight is notable for being Clay's first professional fight in the modern heavyweight division, and featured two iconic fighters at different ends of their careers.

== Background ==
Clay had previously trained under Moore for a short time before leaving his camp and joining Angelo Dundee. Moore had just recently been stripped of his light heavyweight title (a title he had held since 1952), and was nearing 49 years old. The age disparity between the two fighters was so great that Archie began fighting professionally 7 years before Clay was born. The then 20 year old Clay was given 3-1 odds of defeating Moore. In the days before the fight, Clay had rhymed that "Archie Moore...Must fall in four."

== The fight ==
Clay won the fight through a technical knockout in the fourth round, as he had predicted in his stanza before the bout, having knocked down Moore three times in the round before it was stopped.

== Aftermath ==
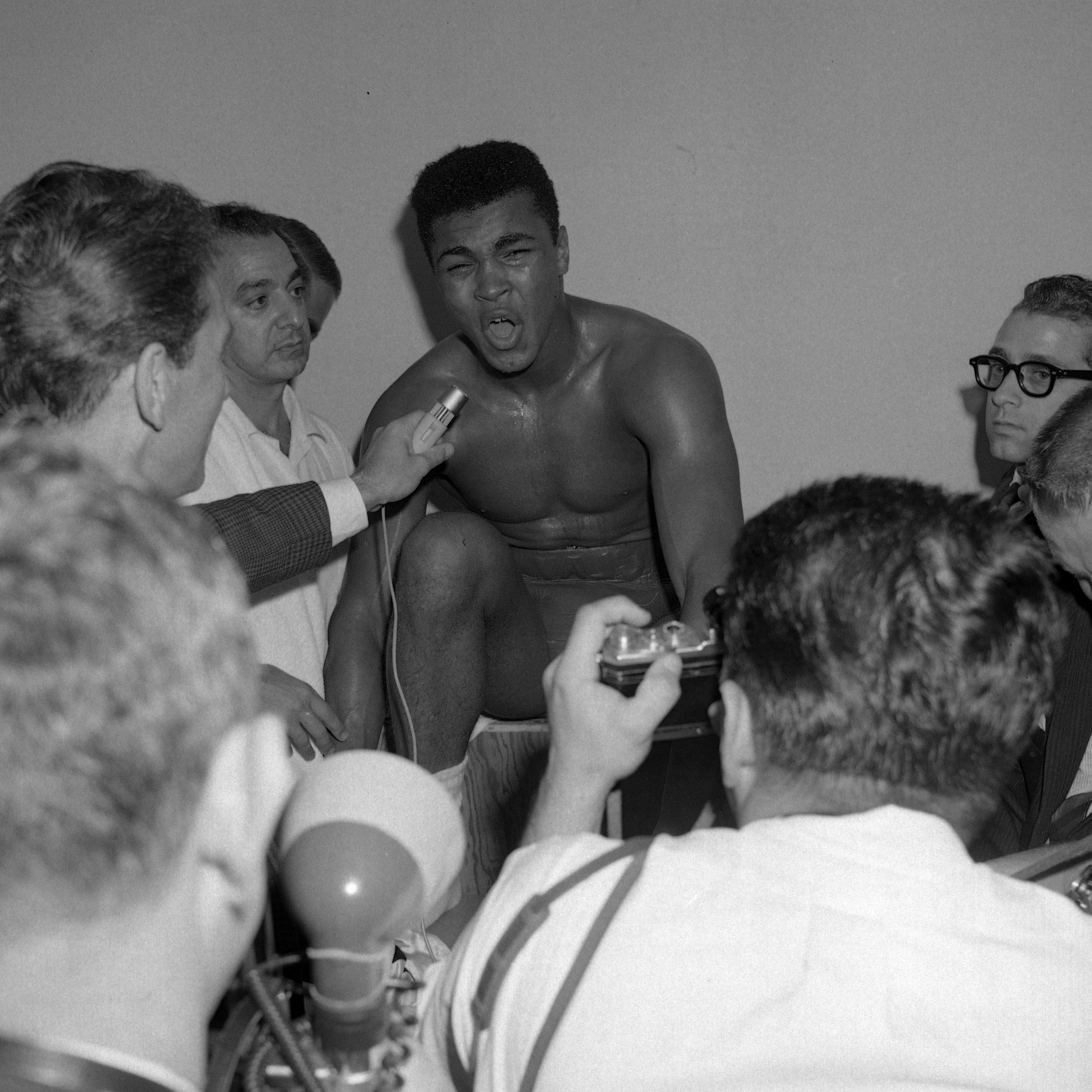
Clay giving a press conference after his victory

Moore would fight one more time, four months later when he stopped Iron Mike DiBiase in the 3rd round.

== Undercard ==
Confirmed bouts:

Preceded by vs. Willie Pastrano	Archie Moore's bouts 15 November 1962	Succeeded by vs. Mike DiBiase
Preceded by vs. Alejandro Lavorante	Cassius Clay's bouts 15 November 1962	Succeeded by vs. Charlie Powell
