= Freddie Mack =

American boxer

Freddie Mack (15 September 1934 – 11 January 2009), sometimes also spelled Freddy Mack and also known as Mr. Superbad, was a light-heavyweight boxer. He later enjoyed success in the UK as a Funk/Soul singer and DJ.

== Biography ==
Mack was born on a cotton plantation in Bennettsville, South Carolina, to father Fred Mack, black American foreman of the Carolina Breeding Estate and mother Florence Purvis, an Italian kitchen worker originally from Bracciano, just outside Rome, Italy.

He was a childhood friend of Floyd Patterson, who introduced him to boxing at Cus D'Amato's gym on 14th Street, Manhattan,

As a light-heavyweight boxer, he reached 3rd place in the world ranking and is remembered for his knockouts against Sante Amonti, Jack Bodell, Chic Calderwood and Roman Morais, among others.

After 66 professional fights he became a sparring partner for, among others, Henry Cooper, Billy Walker (The Blonde Bomber) and John "Cowboy" McCormack.

After living some time in Rome, he retired to England, c. 1965, where he was introduced to the movie scene by fight fans Sir Richard Burton and Rex Harrison. Freddie enjoyed a short film career especially his part in Cleopatra where, as one of the black slaves, he carried Elizabeth Taylor into Rome. He can also be found in small acting roles in the Invisible Man, The Great Rock n Roll Swindle with the Sex Pistols and Scotland's Taggart.

Then, Mack embarked on yet another initially successful career as a singer/entertainer backed by an ever-changing band of British jazz and R&B musicians.His first "group" was an R&B show with singers, dancers and two bands. This settled down into one backing band, called "The Mack Sound" put together by baritone sax player Roger Warwick. The band featured four to five horns, including, for a time, Otis Redding's trombone player Clarence Johnson, and full rhythm section with Alan Cartwright and B.J. Wilson.

From 1967 onwards his line-ups for the "Freddie Mack Sound", the "Fantastic Freddie Mack Show" or the "Freddie Mack Extravaganza" included, variously, Mel Day (vocals), Ray Lewis (bass), Dave Roffey (lead guitar), Ged Peck (lead guitar), Rod Jones (bass), Dick Morrissey (tenor sax), B.J. Wilson (drums), Roger Truth (drums). Alan Cartwright (bass), Johnny Orlando (vocals), Eddie 'Tan Tan' Thornton (trumpet), Bobby Morris (keyboards), Tex Makin (bass), Bill Davidson (organ), Art Regis(Organ), Viv Prince (Drums), Derry Wilkie (vocals), Tony Gomez (keyboards), Tony Morgan (vocals), Kookie Etan (vocals), Bob Mundy (vocals), Steve Mustang Sallis (lead guitar), Brian Williams (bass), Jimmy Jewell (tenor saxophone), Jeff Bridge (tenor saxophone), Phil Presland (baritone saxophone) John Walsh (organ), Pat Green (drums) and Chris Burdett (Tenor Saxophone) Steve Humphries, (Bass), Mick Clarke, (Guitar), Jeffrey Jai Seopardie, (drums), among many others.

In 1969 he was arrested for being an illegal alien in the UK but managed to avoid deportation.

At the end of 1974, Mack signed to K-Tel Records as Mr. Superbad and recorded many records under this label. He also sang on the 1975 hit "Kung Fu Man" on UltraFunk for Contempo Records.

He went to live in Plains, North Lanarkshire in 1979 and spent the time from then till his retirement in 2005 working as a Radio DJ and doing gigs with his Disco Show. His voice could be heard over the airwaves of Radio Clyde every Saturday night for many years.

In 1981, his strong American voice featured on the Tight Fit megamix song Back to the Sixties. The track reached number 4 in the UK Charts. His words are at the start of the song and are "Wam Bam Alakazam, that's the sound, the super sound of the 60's, going back and checking it out, ready for some more? Hit that floor! The great days are back again!" Following his departure from Radio Clyde, in 1991, he joined Glasgow's East End Radio and found huge popularity.

In 2001 he founded The Scot's Boxing Hall of Fame of which he was named president and there have been three Induction Events with a fourth on 13 September 2008 in the Quality Inn, Glasgow Central Hotel.

Between 2002 and 2003 he presented the Superbad Saturday Night programme on Lanarkshire radio station Clan FM which was a mix of soul music and chat. Mack died on 11 January 2009.

== Discography ==
- The Fantastic Freddy Mack Show (live 1966) – (Rayrik TPLMP 142/143)

As Freddie Mack's Extravanganza in Sounds (Extravaganza is misspelt on 7" release):

- A: People – Part One; B: People – Part Two 1973

As Mr Superbad:

- Superbad is Back 1973 (released only in America)
- Superbad 1974
- Souled Out 1975
- Soul Motion 1976
- Soul City 1977
- Superbad Returns 1981

== Professional boxing record ==
27 Wins (14 knockouts, 12 decisions, 1 DQ), 19 Losses (4 knockouts, 15 decisions), 3 Draws, 2 No Contests
Result	Record	Opponent	Type	Round	Date	Location	Notes
Loss	24–6	(United Kingdom) Jack Bodell	PTS	8	7 September 1965	(United Kingdom) Earls Court Arena, Kensington, London	Mathis knocked out at 2:58 of the second round.
Win	40–5–1	(Scotland) Chic Calderwood	KO	8	3 February 1965	(United Kingdom) Wolverhampton, West Midlands	
Win	16–4	(United Kingdom) Jack Bodell	TKO	5	29 September 1964	(United Kingdom) Embassy Sportsdrome, Birmingham, West Midlands	Referee stopped the bout at 1:15 of the fifth round.
Win	16–1–1	(Italy) Giuseppe Migliari	KO	8	12 September 1964	(Italy) Rome	
Loss	23–0–3	(Italy) Piero Del Papa	PTS	10	24 May 1964	(Italy) Brescia, Lombardy	
Win	15–1	(Italy) Benito Penna	PTS	10	6 May 1964	(Italy) PalaLido, Milan	Referee stopped the bout at 1:15 of the fifth round.
Win	18–13–2	(United Kingdom) Ray Shiel	TKO	5	25 March 1964	(United Kingdom) Midlands Sporting Club, Solihull, West Midlands	
Win	17–15–2	(United Kingdom) Ron Gray	DQ	2	3 March 1964	(United Kingdom) Granby Halls, Leicester, Leicestershire	
Loss	17–12–2	(United Kingdom) Ray Shiel	PTS	8	6 February 1964	(United Kingdom) Tower Circus, Blackpool, Lancashire	
Draw	19–1–2	(Italy) Piero Tomasoni	PTS	10	15 November 1963	(Italy) Palazzetto dello Sport, Rome	
Win	11–7–1	(Ghana) Joey Armstrong	TKO	4	23 October 1963	(United Kingdom) Wolverhampton Civic Hall, Wolverhampton, West Midlands	
Win	6–2	(Nigeria) Joe Louis	KO	1	25 September 1963	(United Kingdom) Midlands Sporting Club, Solihull, West Midlands	Louis knocked out at 0:45 of the first round.
Loss	42–6–1	(Wales) Joe Erskine	PTS	10	10 August 1963	(Wales) Newtown Pavilion, Newtown, Powys	
Loss	13–4	(United States) Sonny Banks	SD	10	5 June 1963	(United States) Graystone Ballroom, Detroit, Michigan	
No Contest	6–3	(Brazil) Renato Moraes	NC	7	18 January 1963	(Italy) Palazzetto dello Sport, Rome	
Draw	13–0–1	(Italy) Piero Tomasoni	PTS	10	20 September 1962	(Italy) Brescia, Lombardy	
No Contest	6–5	(France) Georges Torrecillas	ND	4	19 August 1962	(Italy) Casino Municipale, San Remo, Liguria	
Win	5–2	(Brazil) Renato Moraes	KO	7	13 April 1962	(Italy) Palazzetto dello Sport, Rome	
Win	24–7	(Italy) Ottavio Panunzi	KO	2	19 January 1962	(Italy) Palazzetto dello Sport, Rome	
Loss	29–10	(United States) Jesse Bowdry	PTS	10	24 November 1961	(Italy) Palazzetto dello Sport, Rome	
Win	40–2–2	(Italy) Santo Amonti	TKO	3	6 October 1961	(Italy) Palazzetto dello Sport, Rome	
Draw	5–7–1	(United States) Chuck Garrett	PTS	10	21 August 1961	(United States) Vogue Arena, Chicago, Illinois	
Loss	30–2–2	(Peru) Mauro Mina	PTS	10	29 July 1961	(Peru) Estadio Nacional, Lima	
Loss	29–2–2	(Peru) Mauro Mina	PTS	10	12 April 1961	(Peru) Estadio Nacional, Lima	
Loss	23–5	(Italy) Giulio Rinaldi	PTS	10	24 February 1961	(Italy) Rome	
Win	14–6–1	(Cuba) Lino Rendon	UD	10	30 January 1961	(United States) St. Nicholas Arena, New York City	
Win	8–1	(Puerto Rico) Wilfredo Avellez	TKO	1	7 January 1961	(United States) Madison Square Garden, New York City	
Win	19–7	(United States) Young Beau Jack	KO	6	8 July 1960	(Canada) Sydney, Nova Scotia	
Win	36–4–2	(United States) Junius Washington	PTS	6	10 December 1958	(Canada) Montreal Forum, Montreal, Quebec	
Win	3–4	(United States) Eddie Bramlett	PTS	6	1 December 1958	(United States) St. Nicholas Arena, New York City	
Loss	76–19–2	(Canada) Yvon Durelle	PTS	10	28 August 1958	(Canada) Moncton, New Brunswick	
Loss	5–13–1	(United States) Al Anderson	TKO	4	5 May 1958	(United States) St. Nicholas Arena, New York City	
Win	3–2	(United States) Eddie Bramlett	PTS	6	7 April 1958	(United States) St. Nicholas Arena, New York City	
Win	0–1	(United States) Louis "Baby" Jones	UD	6	15 March 1958	(United States) Boxing From Eastern Parkway, Brooklyn, New York	
Loss	10–12–1	(United States) Curtis Bruce	SD	6	10 February 1958	(United States) St. Nicholas Arena, New York City	
Win	5–3	(United States) Floyd McCoy	PTS	6	13 January 1958	(United States) St. Nicholas Arena, New York City	
Loss	22–5–1	(United States) Jerry Luedee	TKO	8	2 September 1957	(United States) St. Nicholas Arena, New York City	
Win	9–2–1	(United States) Dennis McCann	TKO	5	23 July 1957	(United States) Ansonia, Connecticut	
Win	4–1	(United States) Floyd McCoy	PTS	6	18 July 1957	(Canada) Sherbrooke, Quebec	
Win	2–0	(United States) Wilson Hannibal	PTS	6	24 June 1957	(United States) St. Nicholas Arena, New York City	
Win	5–11–3	(United States) Lou Perry	PTS	6	13 May 1957	(United States) St. Nicholas Arena, New York City	
Loss	8–2–1	(United States) Dennis McCann	PTS	6	19 April 1957	(United States) Hartford, Connecticut	
Win	3–0	(United States) Rudy Williams	KO	1	8 November 1956	(United States) Sunnyside Gardens, Queens, New York City	
Win	2–1	(United States) Charley Black	PTS	4	29 September 1955	(United States) Olympic Auditorium, Los Angeles, California	
Loss	9–1	(United States) Angelo DeFendis	PTS	6	28 June 1955	(United States) Freeport Stadium, Freeport, New York	
Loss	4–7	(United States) Al Anderson	PTS	6	14 June 1955	(United States) Freeport Stadium, Freeport, New York	
Loss	24–4–2	(United States) Paul Pender	TKO	4	6 January 1955	(United States) Mechanics Hall, Boston, Massachusetts	
Loss	2–2–2	(Argentina) David Bondulich	TKO	3	8 November 1954	(United States) St. Nicholas Arena, New York City	Referee stopped the bout at 2:05 of the third round.
Win	1–1	(United States) Tommy Selkirk	PTS	4	23 August 1954	(United States) Boxing From Eastern Parkway, Brooklyn, New York	
Loss	0–1–1	(United States) Lou Perry	PTS	4	16 August 1954	(United States) Boxing From Eastern Parkway, Brooklyn, New York	
Loss	1–0	(United States) Alan Watson	KO	2	12 August 1954	(United States) Eintracht Oval, Astoria, Queens, New York City	
