= Muhammad Ali vs. Cleveland Williams =

Boxing match

- Date: November 14, 1966
- Venue: Astrodome, Houston, Texas
- Title(s) on the line: WBC, NYSAC, and The Ring heavyweight titles

Tale of the tape
Boxer	(United States) Muhammad Ali	(United States) Cleveland Williams
Nickname	"The Greatest"	"Big Cat"
Hometown	Louisville, Kentucky	Griffin, Georgia
Pre-fight record	26–0 (21 KO)	69–5–1 (55 KO)
Age	24 years, 9 months	33 years, 4 months
Height	6 ft 3 in (191 cm)	6 ft 2 in (188 cm)
Weight	212 3/4 lb (97 kg)	210 1/2 lb (95 kg)
Style	Orthodox	Orthodox
Recognition	WBC, NYSAC, and The Ring; Heavyweight Champion	WBA; No. 7 Ranked Heavyweight

Result
- Ali won via 3rd round TKO

Muhammad Ali vs. Cleveland Williams was a professional boxing match contested on November 14, 1966, for the WBC, NYSAC, and The Ring championship. Ali dominated the fight and won the bout through a technical knockout in the third round.

== Background ==
Williams was a top heavyweight contender for several years, but had never received a title shot. On the evening of November 29, 1964, two years before the fight, Williams was shot in the stomach by a highway patrolman, for supposedly resisting arrest. The .357 magnum bullet moved across his intestines and lodged in his right hip, doing immense damage to his colon and right kidney. He underwent four operations over the next seven months which resulted in the eventual removal of his right kidney and a loss of 60 pounds, which he later recovered by doing weight-lifting. Williams later said that "I died three times on that operating table." The bullet left vestigial damage: a partial paralysis of some hip muscles and a severely weakened right hip joint. Despite this incident, Williams returned to the ring in 1966 and won four consecutive fights before Ali gave Williams a title shot later that year.

In heavy contrast to Williams, Ali came into this fight in peak physical shape. He had successfully defended his heavyweight titles six times since winning his championship in 1964, most recently against European heavyweight champion Karl Mildenberger in Germany on September 10, 1966, and also beating several top rated heavyweight contenders, including British champion Henry Cooper, and former world champions Floyd Patterson and Sonny Liston, in the years prior. By the time of the Williams fight, Ali had great success with his "stick and move" style: employing a strong left jab, to whittle down his opponents, and a low guard, allowing him to anticipate and dodge incoming punches. Ali's over-two-year dominance in the heavyweight division made him a 5-to-1 favorite going into what would be the champion's fifth title fight of 1966.

== The fight ==
Ali spent most of the fight on the move, circling and maneuvering around Williams, dodging his opponent and landing punches at will. Ali peppered Williams' face with jabs, while also landing several hooks to the head and body. Williams survived the first round without being knocked down, but proved unable to land any significant punches of his own.

In the first half of the second round, Williams made a concerted attempt to cut the ring and trap Ali into a corner. Although he did manage to back Ali into the corners a few times, the champion always managed to slip out quickly and was countering Williams' offense very effectively. The round would get worse for the challenger in its second half. While pursuing Ali as he backed away, Williams walked into a right hook to the jaw which dropped him. He quickly rose to his feet, but Ali went in for the finish, quickly knocking Williams down a second time after a series of quick, sharp punches. Williams once again rose to his feet, but was sent back down with a five punch combination. Because there was no three knockdown rule, and the round ended before the referee could finish his count, Williams was saved by the bell and his corner quickly rushed in to help the battered fighter to his feet and back to his corner.

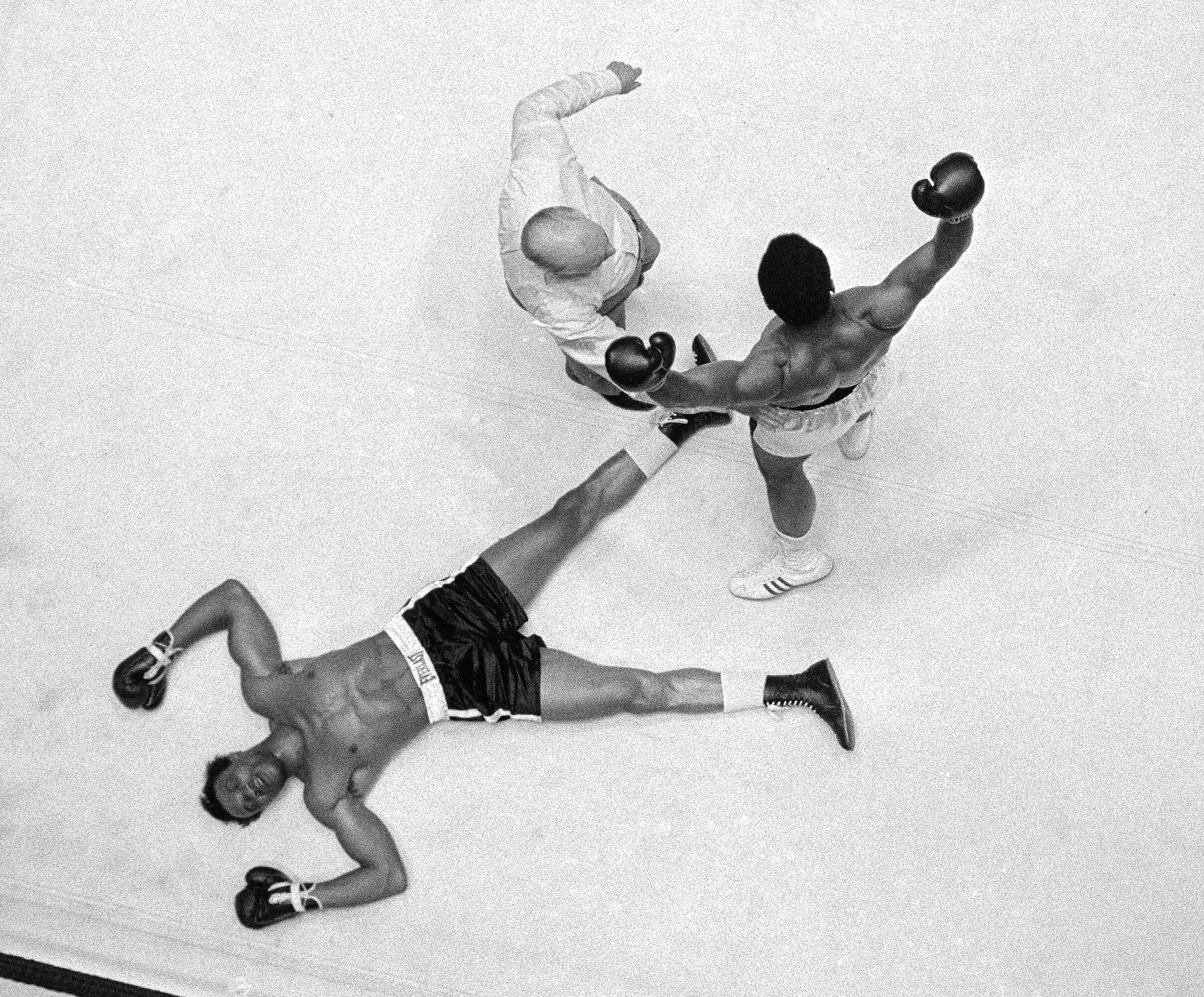
Ali standing over Williams

In the third and final round, Williams came out swinging, throwing several wild punches at the champion in a desperate attempt to turn the tide of the fight, but Ali effectively dodged and countered all of them before beginning an offensive of his own. Ali threw a series of fast combinations sent Williams stumbling backwards before being knocked down for a fourth time. Williams was once again able to beat the count, and courageously fought on, but the end was near. Ali was now chasing after the hurt Williams, and after landing another barrage of punches the referee stepped in to end the fight, one minute and eight seconds into the third round.

== Aftermath ==
Many experts and boxers, including Mike Tyson, regard Ali's performance in this fight to be the finest of his boxing career. This was also the fight in which Ali made famous the move he called the "Ali shuffle".

== Undercard ==
Confirmed bouts:

== Broadcasting ==
Country	Broadcaster
Philippines	CBN 9
United Kingdom	BBC

Preceded by vs. Karl Mildenberger	Muhammad Ali's bouts 14 November 1966	Succeeded by vs. Ernie Terrell
Preceded by vs. Tod Herring	Cleveland Williams's bouts 14 November 1966	Succeeded by vs. Roy Crear
