= Jack Bodell =

English boxer (1940–2016)

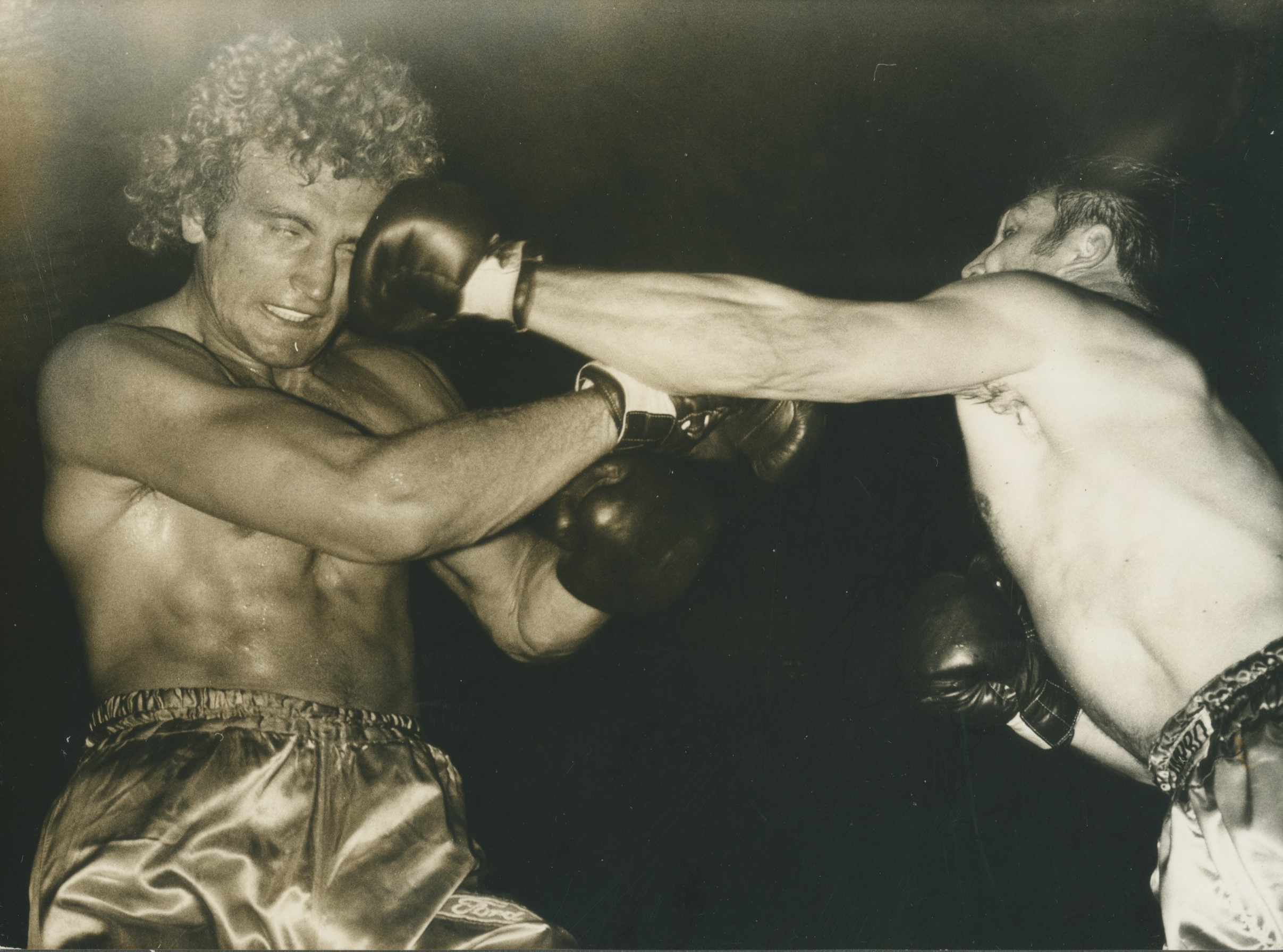
- Bodell (right) against Bugner

Personal information
- Nationality: English
- Born: 11 August 1940 Newhall Swadlincote, Derbyshire, England, UK
- Died: 9 November 2016 (aged 76)
- Height: 6 ft 0.5 in (184 cm)
- Weight: Heavyweight, light heavyweight

Boxing career
- Stance: Southpaw

Boxing record
- Total fights: 71
- Wins: 58
- Win by KO: 31
- Losses: 13

Jack Bodell (11 August 1940 – 9 November 2016) was an English professional boxer who competed in the heavyweight division.

== Boxing career ==
Born in Swadlincote, Derbyshire, Bodell started out as a light heavyweight, winning the 1961 ABA championships and a bronze medal at the European amateur championships the same year. Bodell turned professional in 1962 and won the British heavyweight championship in 1969, before losing it to Henry Cooper in his first defence. Bodell regained the title a year later by outpointing Joe Bugner. He lost the European title in 1971 after a defeat by Spaniard José Manuel Urtaín, and after losing both his British and Commonwealth titles to a second-round knockout by Danny McAlinden in June 1972, he retired from professional boxing.

Among his notable fights were a first-round knockout loss to Jerry Quarry after just 64 seconds, and a points win over future world title contender José Roman. Bodell's record was 58 wins (including 31 by knockout) and 13 losses. He died on 9 November 2016 at the age of 76.

== Professional boxing record ==
71 fights	58 wins	13 losses
By knockout	31	11
By decision	27	2
Draws	0	

No.	Result	Record	Opponent	Type	Round, time	Date	Location	Notes
71	Loss	58–13	(Northern Ireland) Danny McAlinden	KO	2 (15)	27 Jun 1972	(United Kingdom) Villa Park, Birmingham, West Midlands	For BBBofC/Commonwealth Heavyweight Titles
70	Loss	58–12	(Spain) José Manuel Urtain	TKO	2 (15)	17 Dec 1971	(Spain) Madrid	For EBU Heavyweight Title
69	Loss	58–11	(United States) Jerry Quarry	KO	1 (10)	16 Nov 1971	(United Kingdom) Empire Pool, Wembley, London	
68	Win	58–10	(Australia) Joe Bugner	PTS	15	27 Sep 1971	(United Kingdom) Empire Pool, Wembley, London	BBBofC/Commonwealth/EBU Heavyweight Titles
67	Win	57–10	(Canada) Bill Drover	PTS	10	27 Apr 1971	(United Kingdom) Royal Albert Hall, Kensington, London	
66	Win	56–10	(Mexico) Manuel Ramos	PTS	10	13 Apr 1971	(United Kingdom) Wolverhampton Civic Hall, Wolverhampton, West Midlands	
65	Win	55–10	(United States) Jack O'Halloran	KO	4 (10)	24 Feb 1971	(United Kingdom) Wolverhampton Civic Hall, Wolverhampton, West Midlands	
64	Win	54–10	(South Africa) Jimmy Richards	PTS	10	18 Jul 1970	(South Africa) Ellis Park Stadium, Johannesburg, Gauteng	
63	Loss	53–10	(United Kingdom) Henry Cooper	PTS	15	24 Mar 1970	(United Kingdom) Empire Pool, Wembley, London	Lost BBBofC/Commonwealth Heavyweight Titles
62	Win	53–9	(Wales) Carl Gizzi	PTS	15	13 Oct 1969	(United Kingdom) Nottingham Ice Stadium, Nottingham, Nottinghamshire	Won BBBofC Heavyweight Title
61	Win	52–9	(Puerto Rico) José Roman	PTS	10	14 Jul 1969	(United Kingdom) Nottingham Ice Stadium, Nottingham, Nottinghamshire	
60	Win	51–9	(United States) John Jordan	KO	2 (10)	23 Jun 1969	(United Kingdom) London Hilton on Park Lane Hotel, Mayfair, London	
59	Win	50–9	(United Kingdom) Billy Walker	TKO	8 (10)	25 Mar 1969	(United Kingdom) Empire Pool, Wembley, London	
58	Win	49–9	(United States) Roosevelt Eddie	DQ	1 (10)	17 Feb 1969	(United Kingdom) Nottingham Ice Stadium, Nottingham, Nottinghamshire	Eddie disqualified at 1:15 for hitting Bodell while he was down.
57	Win	48–9	(Wales) Carl Gizzi	TKO	2 (12)	27 Nov 1968	(Wales) Sophia Gardens, Cardiff	BBBofC Heavyweight Title Eliminator
56	Win	47–9	(United States) Mel Turnbow	RTD	5 (10)	12 Aug 1968	(United Kingdom) Winter Gardens, Blackpool, Lancashire	
55	Win	46–9	(United Kingdom) Brian London	TKO	9 (12)	10 Jun 1968	(United Kingdom) Liverpool Stadium, Liverpool, Merseyside	BBBofC Heavyweight Title Eliminator
54	Win	45–9	(Belgium) Lion Ven	TKO	2 (10)	6 Mar 1968	(United Kingdom) Solihull Civic Hall, Solihull, West Midlands	
53	Win	44–9	(United Kingdom) Johnny Prescott	PTS	10	6 Feb 1968	(United Kingdom) Wolverhampton Civic Hall, Wolverhampton, West Midlands	RetainedBBBofC Midlands Heavyweight Title
52	Win	43–9	(Antigua and Barbuda) Rocky Campbell	PTS	8	19 Oct 1967	(United Kingdom) Colston Hall, Bristol, Avon	
51	Win	42–9	(Antigua and Barbuda) Rocky Campbell	PTS	8	6 Sep 1967	(United Kingdom) De Montfort Hall, Leicester, Leicestershire	
50	Loss	41–9	(United Kingdom) Henry Cooper	TKO	2 (15)	13 Jun 1967	(United Kingdom) Molineux Stadium, Wolverhampton, West Midlands	For BBBofC/Commonwealth Heavyweight Titles
49	Win	41–8	(United States) Sonny Moore	PTS	10	17 Apr 1967	(United Kingdom) De Montfort Hall, Leicester, Leicestershire	
48	Win	40-8	(United States) Ray Patterson	PTS	10	24 Jan 1967	(United Kingdom) Wolverhampton Civic Hall, Wolverhampton, West Midlands	
47	Win	39–8	(United States) Bob Stallings	TKO	7 (10)	13 Dec 1966	(United Kingdom) Wolverhampton Civic Hall, Wolverhampton, West Midlands	
46	Win	38–8	(Italy) Giorgio Masteghin	TKO	1 (10)	15 Nov 1966	(United Kingdom) Wolverhampton Civic Hall, Wolverhampton, West Midlands	
45	Win	37–8	(Italy) Santo Amonti	PTS	10	27 Oct 1966	(United Kingdom) Liverpool Stadium, Liverpool, Merseyside	
44	Win	36–8	(Brazil) Renato Moraes	PTS	10	21 Sep 1966	(United Kingdom) Embassy Sportsdrome, Birmingham, West Midlands	
43	Loss	35–8	(Italy) Piero Tomasoni	TKO	3 (10)	28 Jun 1966	(United Kingdom) Royal Albert Hall, Kensington, London	
42	Loss	35–7	(United States) Thad Spencer	RTD	2 (10)	18 Apr 1966	(United Kingdom) Belle Vue Zoological Gardens, Belle Vue, Manchester	
41	Win	35–6	(Italy) Giuseppe Migliari	PTS	10	22 Mar 1966	(United Kingdom) Wolverhampton Civic Hall, Wolverhampton, West Midlands	
40	Win	34–6	(United States) Ski Goldstein	TKO	3 (10)	17 Feb 1966	(United Kingdom) Grosvenor House, Mayfair, London	
39	Win	33–6	(United States) Bill Nielsen	TKO	8 (10)	31 Jan 1966	(United Kingdom) Colston Hall, Bristol, Avon	
38	Win	32–6	(France) Joseph Juvillier	PTS	10	19 Jan 1966	(United Kingdom) Solihull Civic Hall, Solihull, West Midlands	
37	Win	31–6	(United States) Billy Daniels	PTS	10	14 Dec 1965	(United Kingdom) Liverpool Stadium, Liverpool, Merseyside	
36	Win	30–6	(Spain) Benito Canal	KO	2 (10)	9 Dec 1965	(United Kingdom) King's Hall, Derby, Derbyshire	
35	Win	29–6	(Spain) Jose Mariano Moracia Ibanes	TKO	5 (8)	8 Nov 1965	(United Kingdom) Nottingham Ice Stadium, Nottingham, Nottinghamshire	
34	Win	28–6	(Socialist Federal Republic of Yugoslavia) Ivan Prebeg	TKO	2 (8)	19 Oct 1965	(United Kingdom) Empire Pool, Wembley, London	
33	Win	27–6	(Jamaica) Al Roye	TKO	3 (8)	4 Oct 1965	(United Kingdom) Colston Hall, Bristol, Avon	
32	Win	26–6	(United States) Levi Forte	TKO	2 (10)	20 Sep 1965	(United Kingdom) Liverpool Stadium, Liverpool, Merseyside	
31	Win	25–6	(United States) Freddie Mack	PTS	8	7 Sep 1965	(United Kingdom) Earls Court Arena, Kensington, London	
30	Win	24–6	(United Kingdom) Dave Ould	DQ	4 (8)	15 Jun 1965	(United Kingdom) St Andrew's, Birmingham, West Midlands	
29	Loss	23–6	(United States) Hubert Hilton	TKO	6 (10)	24 May 1965	(United Kingdom) London Hilton on Park Lane Hotel, Mayfair, London	
28	Win	23–5	(Tonga) Johnny Halafihi	RTD	7 (8)	26 Apr 1965	(United Kingdom) Manor Place Baths, Walworth, London	
27	Win	22–5	(United States) Buddy Turman	TKO	4 (8)	20 Apr 1965	(United Kingdom) Wolverhampton Civic Hall, Wolverhampton, West Midlands	
26	Win	21–5	(United Kingdom) Ray Shiel	TKO	5 (8)	12 Apr 1965	(United Kingdom) Colston Hall, Bristol, Avon	
25	Win	20–5	(Saint Kitts and Nevis) Rudolph Vaughan	KO	2 (8)	30 Mar 1965	(United Kingdom) Empire Pool, Wembley, London	
24	Win	19–5	(Jamaica) Eric Fearon	TKO	4 (8)	22 Mar 1965	(United Kingdom) Nottingham Ice Stadium, Nottingham, Nottinghamshire	
23	Win	18–5	(Jamaica) Al Roye	TKO	4 (8)	1 Mar 1965	(United Kingdom) St James's Hall, Newcastle upon Tyne	
22	Win	17–5	(United Kingdom) Ron Gray	PTS	10	20 Jan 1965	(United Kingdom) Solihull Civic Hall, Solihull, West Midlands	Won BBBofC Midlands Heavyweight Title
21	Loss	16–5	(United States) Freddie Mack	TKO	5 (10)	29 Sep 1964	(United Kingdom) Embassy Sportsdrome, Birmingham, West Midlands	
20	Win	16–4	(United Kingdom) Ron Redrup	PTS	8	21 Apr 1964	(United Kingdom) Embassy Sportsdrome, Birmingham, West Midlands	
19	Loss	15–4	(Wales) Joe Erskine	PTS	10	3 Mar 1964	(United Kingdom) Granby Halls, Leicester, Leicestershire	
18	Loss	15–3	(Brazil) Renato Moraes	TKO	6 (10)	5 Dec 1963	(Italy) Milan, Lombardy	
17	Loss	15–2	(South Africa) Stoffel Willemse	TKO	2 (10)	7 Sep 1963	(South Africa) Olympia Ice rink, Johannesburg, Gauteng	
16	Win	15–1	(United Kingdom) Ron Gray	DQ	5 (8)	7 May 1963	(United Kingdom) Embassy Sportsdrome, Birmingham, West Midlands	
15	Win	14–1	(United Kingdom) Dave Ould	PTS	8	11 Mar 1963	(United Kingdom) Manor Place Baths, Walworth, London	
14	Win	13–1	(Jamaica) Rupert Bentley	KO	3 (8)	6 Mar 1963	(United Kingdom) Solihull Civic Hall, Solihull, West Midlands	
13	Win	12–1	(United Kingdom) Jack Whittaker	TKO	8 (8)	13 Feb 1963	(United Kingdom) Granby Halls, Leicester, Leicestershire	
12	Win	11–1	(United Kingdom) Roy Seward	TKO	3 (12)	10 Dec 1962	(United Kingdom) Nottingham Ice Stadium, Nottingham, Nottinghamshire	Retained BBBofC Midlands Light Heavyweight Title
11	Win	10–1	(Saint Kitts and Nevis) Johnny Hendrickson	TKO	4 (8)	7 Nov 1962	(United Kingdom) Seymour Hall, Marylebone, London, England	
10	Win	9–1	(Jamaica) Rupert Bentley	KO	1 (8)	31 Oct 1962	(United Kingdom) Wolverhampton Civic Hall, Wolverhampton, West Midlands	
9	Win	8–1	(United Kingdom) Brian Lacey Stannard	TKO	7 (8)	8 Oct 1962	(United Kingdom) Nottingham Ice Stadium, Nottingham, Nottinghamshire	
8	Win	7–1	(United Kingdom) Jimmy Blanche	PTS	8	18 Sep 1962	(United Kingdom) Embassy Sportsdrome, Birmingham, West Midlands	
7	Loss	6–1	(Nigeria) Joe Louis	RTD	1 (8)	3 Jul 1962	(United Kingdom) Highbury Speedway Stadium, Fleetwood, Lancashire	
6	Win	6–0	(United Kingdom) Roy Seward	TKO	5 (12)	7 Jun 1962	(United Kingdom) Swadlincote, Derbyshire	Won BBBofC Midlands Light Heavyweight Title
5	Win	5–0	(United Kingdom) Jack Whittaker	PTS	8	17 Apr 1962	(United Kingdom) Granby Halls, Leicester, Leicestershire	
4	Win	4–0	(Nigeria) Joe Louis	PTS	6	2 Apr 1962	(United Kingdom) Nottingham Ice Stadium, Nottingham, Nottinghamshire	
3	Win	3–0	(United Kingdom) Jimmy Leach	TKO	2 (6)	20 Mar 1962	(United Kingdom) Wolverhampton, West Midlands	
2	Win	2–0	(Jamaica) Ossie Nelson	TKO	1 (6)	22 Feb 1962	(United Kingdom) Coventry, West Midlands	
1	Win	1–0	(United Kingdom) Mick Cowan	PTS	6	13 Feb 1962	(United Kingdom) West Bromwich, West Midlands	

== In popular culture ==
Jack Bodell is mentioned in the "Boxing Tonight" sketch in episode 37 of Monty Python's Flying Circus, in which he (played by Nosher Powell) fights Sir Kenneth Clark (played by Graham Chapman).

Achievements
Preceded by Henry Cooper; Vacated	British Heavyweight Champion; 13 October 1969 – 24 March 1970	Succeeded by Henry Cooper
Preceded by Joe Bugner	European Heavyweight Champion; 27 September 1971 – December 1971	Succeeded by Jose Manuel Urtain
Preceded by Joe Bugner	British Heavyweight Champion; Commonwealth Heavyweight Champion; 27 September 1971 – 27 June 1972	Succeeded by Danny McAlinden

== See also ==
- List of left-handed boxers
