= Leotis Martin =

American boxer (1939–1995)

Personal information
- Nickname: Otis Lee
- Born: Leotis Martin; March 10, 1939 Helena, Arkansas, U.S.
- Died: November 20, 1995 (aged 56) Philadelphia, Pennsylvania
- Height: 6 ft 0 1/2 in (1.84 m)
- Weight: Heavyweight

Boxing career
- Reach: 76 in (193 cm)
- Stance: Orthodox

Boxing record
- Total fights: 36
- Wins: 31
- Win by KO: 19
- Losses: 5
- Draws: 0

Leotis Martin (March 10, 1939 – November 20, 1995) was an American boxer, and the inaugural NABF Heavyweight Champion. A fairly-skilled heavyweight with a good punch, he beat rated contenders Alvin Lewis, Thad Spencer, Karl Mildenberger, and Sonny Banks, but is best known for his knockout victory over former heavyweight champion, Sonny Liston. Unfortunately, Martin was forced to retire shortly after the Liston win due to a detached retina. The Ring Magazine listed Martin 68th on its list of the "100-Greatest-Punchers of all Time".

== Amateur career ==
Martin was the 1960 Chicago and Intercity Golden Gloves 160-pound champion and the 1961 160-pound Intercity Golden Gloves Champion (alternate). He also was the United States National AAU 165-pound champion in 1960 and 1961.

== Professional career ==
From February 1964, when Martin fought on the Liston-Clay world heavyweight championship fight undercard, to June 1967, Martin fought 15 times without suffering a defeat. This winning streak qualified him for the WBA heavyweight elimination championship series, after the organization had stripped Muhammad Ali of its world heavyweight crown when he refused induction into the United States Army. On May 10, 1965, he faced Sonny Banks, then one of only two fighters to have knocked Muhammad Ali down for a count. Martin scored a ninth-round knockout over Banks. Martin's jubilation was short lived. Banks never recovered from the blows he received during the fight and died from his injuries.

Although Martin was selected for the WBA title elimination tournament, he was matched, in his first fight, against the ultimate tournament winner Jimmy Ellis. The two fought in the Houston Astrodome on August 5, 1967. Ellis, as was his style at the time, came out sharp, trying to score an early knockout with his sneaky-fast and dangerous right hand. Although unable to knock Martin out, Ellis inflicted a nasty cut on the inside of Martin's mouth, which ultimately caused the fight to be stopped in the ninth round. Scoring was around even at that point. Many had predicted Martin might win the elimination series. Martin had campaigned for a contest with fellow Philadelphian Joe Frazier, but it never happened, mainly due to Martin's loss to Bonavena, who got the Frazier match instead.

Martin rebounded from the Ellis defeat by traveling to Germany to knock out German and European heavyweight champion Karl Mildenberger in seven rounds. Martin appeared to be back in contention for a title shot when he dropped a decision to California heavyweight Henry Clark (record 14–3–2). He then came back from that defeat to upset and knock out Thad Spencer in nine rounds. His title quest, however, was again derailed when Martin travelled to Argentina to meet Oscar Bonavena in his home town of Buenos Aires, where he lost by decision. Bonavena went on to fight Frazier for the world title.

After the Bonavena loss, Martin put together a four-fight win streak, including two wins over Detroit hometown favorite Al "Blue" Lewis. These fine efforts landed him a match with veteran former champion Sonny Liston on December 6, 1969. Liston had resumed boxing after his two stunning losses to Muhammad Ali, and had run off a winning streak of 14 fights with 13 knockouts. Although slowed by age, Liston was still a feared heavyweight.

Martin, who formerly had been Liston's sparring partner, devised a simple fight plan. Rather than attempting to slug with the bigger and heavier Liston, Martin stayed away from him, boxing and waiting for the older man to tire. Despite a close call in the fourth round when Liston caught him with a booming left hook that knocked Martin down, Martin seemed to get stronger with every passing round while Liston weakened. Finally, in the ninth round, Martin hit Liston with a powerful combination that knocked the former champion out. However, Martin suffered a detached retina during the fight, and announced his retirement from boxing after the fight.

== After boxing ==
For the next 26 years, Martin lived a quiet life in the Mount Airy section of Philadelphia. Early in 1995, he retired from Budd & Co. after 31 years as a machinist. In November that year, Martin had a stroke brought on by hypertension and complications from diabetes, and died en route to a local hospital, aged 56.

Martin's death received little coverage in the boxing media.

== Professional boxing record ==
36 fights	31 wins	5 losses
By knockout	19	2
By decision	12	3
By disqualification	0	0
Draws	0	

No.	Result	Record	Opponent	Type	Round	Date	Location	Notes
36	Win	31–5	(United States) Sonny Liston	KO	9 (12)	06/12/1969	(United States) International Hotel & Casino, Las Vegas	Won inaugural NABF Heavyweight Title; Martin forced to retire due to torn retina after the bout
35	Win	30–5	(United States) Roger Russell	UD	10	18/11/1969	(United States) Spectrum, Philadelphia	
34	Win	29–5	(The Bahamas) Wendell Newton	KO	7 (10)	28/10/1969	(United States) Blue Horizon, Philadelphia	
33	Win	28–5	(United States) Alvin Lewis	SD	10	26/02/1969	(United States) Detroit Olympia, Detroit	
32	Win	27–5	(United States) Alvin Lewis	TKO	9 (10)	26/11/1968	(United States) Detroit	
31	Loss	26–5	(Argentina) Oscar Bonavena	UD	10	07/09/1968	Estadio Luna Park, Buenos Aires, Argentina	
30	Win	26–4	(United States) Thad Spencer	TKO	9 (10)	28/05/1968	Royal Albert Hall, Kensington, London, England, United Kingdom	
29	Loss	25–4	(United States) Henry Clark	MD	10	27/04/1968	(United States) Coliseum Arena, Oakland, California	
28	Win	25–3	(Germany) Karl Mildenberger	KO	7 (12)	05/04/1968	Festhalle, Frankfurt, Germany	
27	Loss	24–3	(United States) Roger Russell	SD	10	27/11/1967	(United States) Arena, Philadelphia	
26	Loss	24–2	(United States) Jimmy Ellis	TKO	9 (12)	05/08/1967	(United States) Astrodome, Houston	WBA Heavyweight Title elimination tournament; quarter-finals; Ellis-Martin, Quarry-Patterson, Bonavena-Mildenberger, Terrell-Spencer
25	Win	24–1	(United States) Billy Daniels	PTS	10	06/06/1967	(United States) Toledo, Ohio	
24	Win	23–1	(United States) Lee Carr	KO	2 (10)	29/05/1967	(United States) Arena, Philadelphia	
23	Win	22–1	(Trinidad and Tobago) Ulric Regis	TKO	5 (10)	29/05/1967	Port of Spain, Trinidad and Tobago	
22	Win	21–1	(South Africa) Remington Dyanti	TKO	3 (10)	26/02/1967	Baltiska Hallen, Malmö, Sweden	
21	Win	20–1	(Spain) Mariano Echevarria	RTD	3 (10)	03/02/1967	Gothenburg, Sweden	
20	Win	19–1	(Peru) Roberto Davila	PTS	10	22/12/1966	Lima, Peru	
19	Win	18–1	(United States) Amos Johnson	KO	3 (10)	05/12/1966	(United States) Arena, Philadelphia	
18	Win	17–1	(United States) Von Clay	PTS	8	06/12/1965	(United States) Arena, Philadelphia	
17	Win	16–1	(United States) Curtis Bruce	TKO	6 (10)	14/10/1965	(United States) Philadelphia	
16	Win	15–1	(United States) Sonny Banks	KO	9 (10)	10/05/1965	(United States) Arena, Philadelphia	Banks dies of injuries sustained in this bout.
15	Win	14–1	(United States) Don Warner	KO	1 (?)	19/04/1965	(United States) Arena, Philadelphia	
14	Win	13–1	(United States) Earl Battles	KO	3 (?)	29/03/1965	(United States) Philadelphia A.C., Philadelphia	
13	Win	12–1	(United States) Dave Bailey	PTS	8	22/02/1965	(United States) Philadelphia A.C., Philadelphia	
12	Win	11–1	(United States) Dave Russell	PTS	8	20/04/1964	(United States) Arena, Philadelphia	
11	Win	10–1	(Jamaica) Allan Harmon	PTS	6	25/02/1964	(United States) Convention Hall, Miami Beach, Florida	
10	Loss	9–1	(United States) Floyd McCoy	KO	2 (8)	30/09/1963	(United States) Arena, Philadelphia	
9	Win	9–0	(United States) Billy Johnson	KO	1 (?)	22/07/1963	(United States) Convention Center, Las Vegas	
8	Win	8–0	(United States) Johnny Alford	PTS	6	24/06/1963	(United States) Convention Hall, Miami Beach, Florida	
7	Win	7–0	(United States) Frank Davis	TKO	2 (?)	24/06/1963	(United States) Cambria A.C., Miami Beach, Florida	
6	Win	6–0	(United States) Monte Monnie McCoy	TKO	4 (6)	13/04/1963	(United States) Arena, Philadelphia	
5	Win	5–0	(United States) Buddy Moore	PTS	6	05/02/1963	(United States) Philadelphia	
4	Win	4–0	(United States) Joe Washington	PTS	6	18/12/1962	(United States) American Legion Arena, Reading, Pennsylvania	
3	Win	3–0	German Hernandez	KO	1 (?)	21/05/1962	(United States) Philadelphia	
2	Win	2–0	(United States) Bob Rutherford	KO	4 (?)	23/04/1962	(United States) Alhambra A.C., Philadelphia	
1	Win	1–0	(United States) Bobby Warthem	SD	4	26/01/1962	Kenwick Terrace, Sarnia, Ontario, Canada	

Regional titles
New title	NABF Heavyweight Champion; December 6, 1969 – February 2, 1970; Retired	Vacant Title next held by Muhammad Ali
