= Todd Spencer =

American football player (born 1962)

No. 36, 32
- Position: Running back

Personal information
- Born: July 26, 1961 (age 65); Portland, Oregon, U.S.
- Listed height: 6 ft 0 in (1.83 m)
- Listed weight: 203 lb (92 kg)

Career information
- High school: El Cerrito (El Cerrito, California)
- College: USC
- NFL draft: 1984: undrafted

Career history
- Pittsburgh Steelers (1984–1985); Los Angeles Rams (1986)*; San Diego Chargers (1987)
- * Offseason or practice squad member only

Career NFL statistics
- Rushing yards: 80
- Rushing average: 2.9
- Receptions: 5
- Receiving yards: 72
- Stats at Pro Football Reference

Todd Lamont Spencer (born July 26, 1962) is an American former professional football player who was a running back for three seasons in the National Football League (NFL) with the Pittsburgh Steelers and San Diego Chargers. He played college football for the USC Trojans. He is the son of Thad Spencer, a former heavyweight boxer who was active in the 1960s and 1970s.
