= Billy Walker (boxer) =

English boxer

Personal information
- Nationality: English
- Born: William Walker; 3 March 1939 (age 87) Stepney, London, England
- Weight: Heavyweight

Boxing career
- Stance: Orthodox

Boxing record
- Total fights: 31
- Wins: 21
- Win by KO: 16
- Losses: 8
- Draws: 2

William Walker (born Stepney, London, 3 March 1939) is a British retired heavyweight boxer and actor. He turned professional in 1961 after 39 amateur bouts. His nickname was "Golden Boy". His professional record was 21 wins (16 by knockout), 8 losses and 2 draws. During 1967, he fought for both the British and European titles, losing to Henry Cooper (Great Britain) and Karl Mildenberger (West Germany) respectively. After he retired from the ring in 1969 he appeared in several British films and TV shows. His autobiography When the Gloves Came Off was published in 2007.

== Early life and family ==
William Walker is the son of William James Walker, a brewery worker, drayman at Watney's brewery, and wife (Limehouse, April/June 1925) Ellen Louisa Page (Southwark, October/December 1903 – ?). He is the youngest of three brothers.

During World War II, his father served in the Royal Air Force and the boys lived with their mother in Bedfordshire, and later in Ilford, Essex. He left school at 16 and started working in the printing business. Later a friend introduced him to a more highly paid job as a porter in London's historic Billingsgate Fish Market. He was also a bouncer and part-time DJ at the Ilford Palais dance hall which was managed by Jimmy Savile at the time. He joined a West Ham boxing club to keep fit, and was eventually persuaded to spar with other members and found that he had the talent to box competitively.

== Amateur career ==
Walker's older brother George had been a successful light heavyweight boxer and persuaded him to enter the sport, with the ambition eventually to turn professional.

With his natural ability, and George's guidance, within three years he had won the British (ABA) Amateur Heavyweight title. Soon after a first-round knockout of 6 ft 4 in (1.93 m) American Cornelius Perry in an international tournament broadcast on national TV, promoters were competing to sign Walker to lucrative contracts. About this time the media started calling him "The Golden Boy" and "The Blond Bomber".

Billy refused a rematch with Derry heavyweight Jim Monaghan after a disputed first-round TKO in a four-nations competition in Dublin 1961. Monaghan had Walker bleeding heavily from the nose from a steady hard jab before the ref prematurely stopped the fight when Monaghan got caught with a right to the body. Monaghan was never knocked out as an amateur or pro.

== Professional career ==
With brother George as his manager, Walker embarked on a professional career that in six years would see him challenging for both the British and European titles. With his curly blond hair, boyish good looks and all action style the public flocked to see his fights. George invested the purses in a string of night clubs and restaurants and soon the brothers were rich. Billy Walker moved to London's West End and mixed with society's elite. On one occasion he was presented to the Queen, who told him that she enjoyed watching his fights. This was during London's "swinging sixties" and Walker took full advantage of his wealth, fame and good looks to have fun with a series of beautiful women. Although he never fought in the US, during his career he stopped rated American heavyweights Charlie Powell, Bowie Adams, Ray Patterson and Thad Spencer inside the distance. In spite of a few weeks' coaching at Harry's Gym in Harlem, Walker's defensive skills remained marginal, and some of his later fights against world class opponents had to be stopped owing to cuts and excessive bleeding from his nose. In 1969 at the age of 30 he retired from the ring, a very wealthy young man.

== Business life ==
When Billy Walker retired from boxing, George Walker continued to run their business empire as though it were his alone. This soon led to disputes and eventually they parted company. Billy Walker retained enough assets to live very comfortably, with various business interests of his own, including Billy's Baked Potato, a chain of fast food outlets. He also played comedy roles in two Frankie Howerd films, Up Pompeii and Up the Chastity Belt in 1971. Changing financial conditions a few years later forced him to look for other income. He moved to Jersey, a tax haven in the Channel Islands and became a successful property developer. George Walker went on to become a tycoon in the UK gambling and film industries with his Brent Walker Group but he too suffered a reversal of fortune, but later developing new business interests in Russia before dying of a heart attack in the south of France in March 2011.

He has been active on the speaking circuit and is an honorary steward for the British Boxing Board of Control. He collaborated with the Kray twins' confidant and writer Robin McGibbon on his autobiography When the Gloves Came Off (ISBN 978-1-86105-970-3), which was published in 2007.

== Marriages and issue ==
In 1968, Billy Walker married Susan Coleopy and they had two children, Daniel and Clare. They divorced in 1976.

In September 1981 his girlfriend Chrissie gave birth to a son, Warren, but she opted to bring him up on her own. They are still on good terms.

He married Jackie in 1982. They also had two children, Kelly and Thomas (Tom), but divorced in the 1990s.

In 1997 he married Patricia but she died of cancer in 2003.

Walker is married to his fourth wife, Susan, whom he had known from his time in Jersey about thirty years previously. They live in Jersey.

== Professional boxing record ==
21 Wins (16 knockouts, 3 decisions, 2 DQ), 8 Losses (5 knockouts, 2 decisions, 1 DQ), 2 Draws
Result	Record	Opponent	Type	Round	Date	Location	Notes
Loss	49–9	(United Kingdom) Jack Bodell	TKO	8	25 March 1969	(United Kingdom) Empire Pool, Wembley, London	Referee stopped the bout at 1:45 of the eighth round.
Win	32–7	(United States) Thad Spencer	TKO	6	12 November 1968	(United Kingdom) Empire Pool, Wembley, London	Referee stopped the bout at 2:04 of the sixth round.
Loss	35–13–1	(United Kingdom) Henry Cooper	TKO	6	7 November 1967	(United Kingdom) Empire Pool, Wembley, London	BBBofC/Commonwealth Heavyweight Titles.
Loss	50–3–3	(Germany) Karl Mildenberger	TKO	8	21 March 1967	(United Kingdom) Empire Pool, Wembley, London	EBU Heavyweight Title. Referee stopped the bout at 1:43 of the eighth round.
Win	40–9–4	(Italy) Giulio Rinaldi	DQ	1	13 February 1967	(United Kingdom) Belle Vue Zoological Gardens, Belle Vue, Manchester	Rinaldi disqualified at 2:45 of the first round for headbutting.
Win	16–5–2	(United States) Ray Patterson	TKO	8	6 December 1966	(United Kingdom) Royal Albert Hall, Kensington, London	
Win	19–9–2	(Argentina) Jose Menno	TKO	10	25 October 1966	(United Kingdom) Royal Albert Hall, Kensington, London	
Win	18–5–2	(Germany) Horst Benedens	TKO	1	20 September 1966	(United Kingdom) Empire Pool, Wembley, London	Referee stopped the bout at 1:35 of the first round.
Win	17–2–1	(United States) Bowie Adams	KO	3	2 May 1966	(United Kingdom) Belle Vue Zoological Gardens, Belle Vue, Manchester	
Win	14–9–4	(Sweden) Lars Olaf Norling	TKO	4	31 March 1966	(United Kingdom) London Hilton on Park Lane Hotel, Mayfair, London	
Loss	10–2–5	(Argentina) Hector Eduardo Corletti	TKO	8	19 October 1965	(United Kingdom) Empire Pool, Wembley, London	
Draw	10–2–4	(Argentina) Hector Eduardo Corletti	PTS	10	19 August 1965	(Italy) Ariston Theatre, Sanremo, Liguria	
Loss	32–12	(United Kingdom) Brian London	PTS	10	30 March 1965	(United Kingdom) Empire Pool, Wembley, London	
Win	25–10–3	(United States) Charlie Powell	KO	2	26 January 1965	(United Kingdom) London Olympia, Kensington, London	
Win	45–7–1	(Wales) Joe Erskine	PTS	10	27 October 1964	(United Kingdom) Empire Pool, Wembley, London	
Win	20–4–1	(United States) Bill Nielsen	KO	2	12 May 1964	(United Kingdom) Empire Pool, Wembley, London	Nielsen knocked out at 1:30 of the second round.
Loss	19–4–1	(United States) Bill Nielsen	TKO	8	10 March 1964	(United Kingdom) Royal Albert Hall, Kensington, London	
Win	41–24–2	(Jamaica) Joe Bygraves	DQ	6	28 January 1964	(United Kingdom) London Olympia, Kensington, London	
Loss	22–3–2	(United Kingdom) Johnny Prescott	PTS	10	12 November 1963	(United Kingdom) Empire Pool, Wembley, London	
Win	22–2–2	(United States) Johnny Prescott	TKO	10	10 September 1963	(United Kingdom) Royal Albert Hall, Kensington, London	
Win	8–4–1	(Germany) Kurt Stroer	TKO	2	24 June 1963	(Wales) Market hall, Carmarthen	
Win	20–22–4	(Spain) Jose Mariano Moracia Ibanes	PTS	8	11 June 1963	(United Kingdom) Royal Albert Hall, Kensington, London	
Win	13–4–1	(United States) Joe DeGrazio	KO	3	26 March 1963	(United Kingdom) Empire Pool, Wembley, London	
Win	31–14–4	(United Kingdom) Peter Bates	KO	2	29 January 1963	(United Kingdom) London Olympia, Kensington, London	Bates knocked out at 2:30 of the second round.
Win	31–29–6	(Spain) José González Sales	PTS	8	26 November 1962	(United Kingdom) Belle Vue Zoological Gardens, Belle Vue, Manchester	
Loss	30–29–6	(Spain) José González Sales	DQ	3	20 November 1962	(United Kingdom) Leicester, Leicestershire	
Win	14–3	(Canada) Phonse LaSaga	KO	1	13 November 1962	(United Kingdom) Empire Pool, Wembley, London	LaSaga knocked out at 1:57 of the first round.
Win	3–3	(Ghana) Robert Archie Moore	KO	2	6 September 1962	(United Kingdom) Liverpool Stadium, Liverpool, Merseyside	
Win	12–25–6	(Germany) Erwin Hack	TKO	1	14 August 1962	(United Kingdom) Blackpool, Lancashire	
Draw	16–17–2	(Spain) Jose Mariano Moracia Ibanes	PTS	8	22 May 1962	(United Kingdom) Empire Pool, Wembley, London	
Win	14–11–1	(Belgium) Jose Peyre	TKO	5	27 March 1962	(United Kingdom) Empire Pool, Wembley, London	
