= Thad Spencer =

American boxer

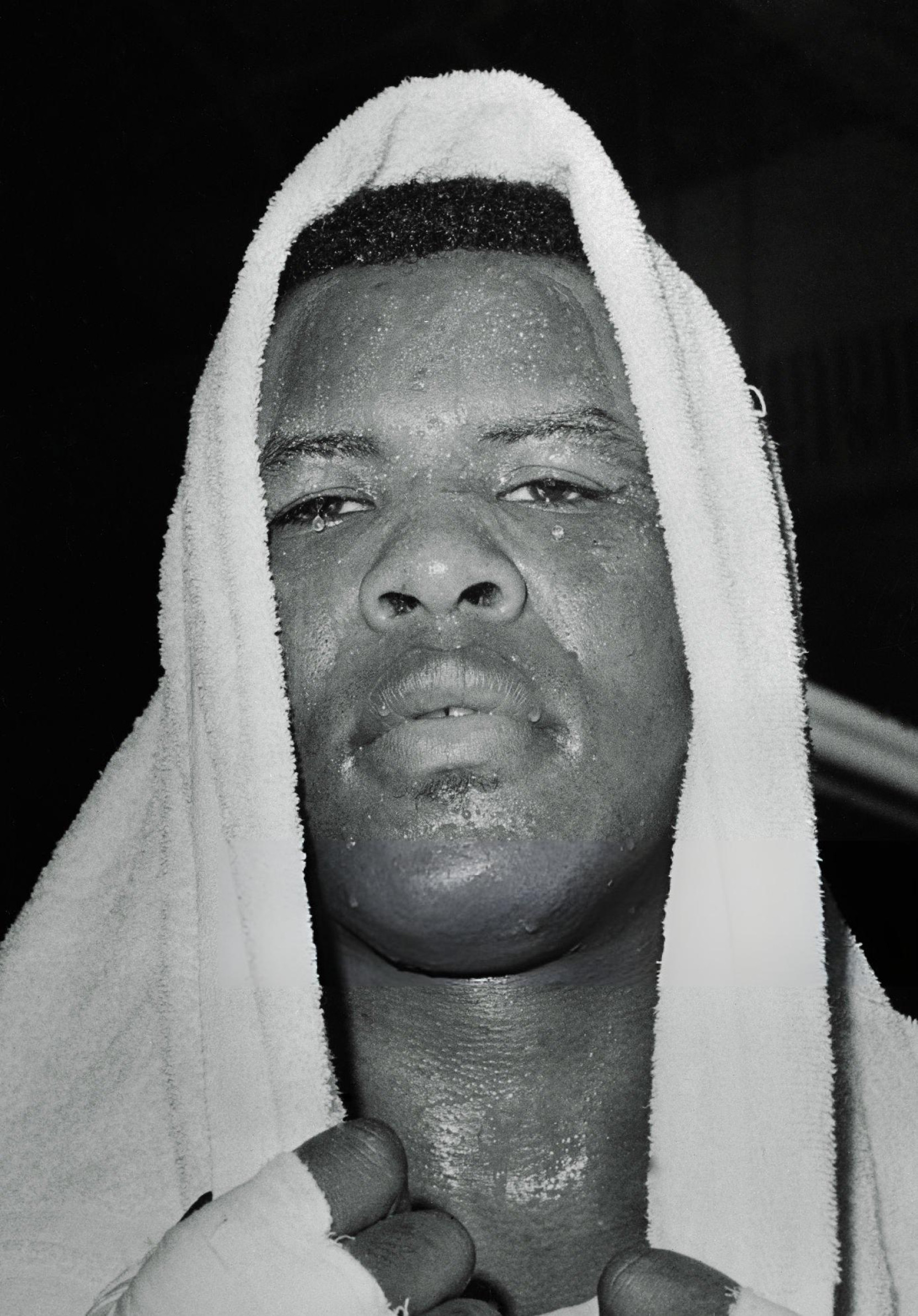
- Spencer in 1968

Personal information
- Nickname: Babe
- Nationality: American
- Born: Thaddeus Spencer Jr. March 28, 1943 Portland, Oregon, U.S.
- Died: December 13, 2013 (aged 70) Vallejo, California, U.S.
- Height: 5 ft 11 in (1.80 m)
- Weight: Heavyweight

Boxing career
- Stance: Orthodox

Boxing record
- Total fights: 46
- Wins: 32
- Win by KO: 14
- Losses: 13
- Draws: 1

Thaddeus Spencer Jr. (March 28, 1943 – December 13, 2013) was an American heavyweight boxer.

A native of Portland, Oregon, Spencer made his professional boxing debut in May 1960. After building up a 31–5 record, Spencer was considered one of the top boxers of his time. With wins over contenders Doug Jones, Brian London, George Johnson, Tom McNeeley and Amos Lincoln, he was regarded highly enough to be a part of the eight-man WBA elimination tournament, held after Muhammad Ali had been stripped of the title. Spencer won a 12-round decision over former title-holder Ernie Terrell in August 1967 and was then matched against Jerry Quarry in the semi-finals. Despite entering the bout as a 6–4 favorite, Spencer lost to Quarry by a 12th-round TKO. Spencer lost his next three fights by knockout, to Leotis Martin, Billy Walker and Mac Foster, and was never a serious title contender again. He continued boxing until 1971, though without winning another bout.

Spencer died in his sleep on December 13, 2013, in Vallejo, California. Spencer's son, Todd Spencer, was a football star for U.S.C., and played three seasons in the NFL for the Steelers and the Chargers.

== Professional boxing record ==
| 46 fights | 32 wins | 13 losses |
|---|---|---|
| By knockout | 14 | 7 |
| By decision | 18 | 6 |
| Draws | 1 | |

| No. | Result | Record | Opponent | Type | Round, time | Date | Location | Notes |
|---|---|---|---|---|---|---|---|---|
| 46 | Loss | 32–13–1 | (United States) Tony Doyle | UD | 10 | 07/06/1971 | (United States) Dallas Memorial Auditorium, Dallas, Texas | |
| 45 | Loss | 32–12–1 | (United States) Ron Stander | UD | 10 | 23/04/1971 | (United States) Omaha Civic Auditorium, Omaha, Nebraska | |
| 44 | Loss | 32–11–1 | (Venezuela) Jose Luis Garcia | KO | 2 (10) | 05/10/1970 | (Venezuela) Caracas | |
| 43 | Loss | 32–10–1 | (United States) Tony Doyle | UD | 10 | 28/05/1970 | (United States) Minneapolis Auditorium, Minneapolis, Minnesota | |
| 42 | Draw | 32–9–1 | (United States) Charlie Reno | PTS | 10 | 18/03/1970 | (United States) Seattle Center Arena, Seattle, Washington | |
| 41 | Loss | 32–9 | (United States) Mac Foster | KO | 1 (10) | 20/05/1969 | (United States) Selland Arena, Fresno, California | |
| 40 | Loss | 32–8 | (United Kingdom) Billy Walker | TKO | 6 (10) | 12/11/1968 | (United Kingdom) Empire Pool, Wembley, London | |
| 39 | Loss | 32–7 | (United States) Leotis Martin | TKO | 9 (10) | 28/05/1968 | (United Kingdom) Royal Albert Hall, Kensington, London | |
| 38 | Loss | 32–6 | (United States) Jerry Quarry | TKO | 12 (12) | 03/02/1968 | (United States) Oakland Arena, Oakland, California | WBA World Heavyweight Title Tournament Semi-Finals |
| 37 | Win | 32–5 | (United States) Ernie Terrell | UD | 12 | 05/08/1967 | (United States) Astrodome, Houston, Texas | WBA World Heavyweight Title Tournament Quarter-Finals |
| 36 | Win | 31–5 | (United States) Amos Lincoln | TKO | 8 (10) | 26/06/1967 | (United States) Cow Palace, Daly City, California | |
| 35 | Win | 30–5 | (United States) Doug Jones | UD | 10 | 14/10/1966 | (United States) Cow Palace, Daly City, California | |
| 34 | Loss | 29–5 | (United States) Bill McMurray | TKO | 7 (12) | 13/09/1966 | (United States) Sacramento, California | Lost California Heavyweight Title |
| 33 | Win | 29–4 | (United Kingdom) Brian London | PTS | 10 | 02/05/1966 | (United Kingdom) Belle Vue Zoological Gardens, Belle Vue, Manchester | |
| 32 | Win | 28–4 | (United Kingdom) Jack Bodell | RTD | 2 (10) | 18/04/1966 | (United Kingdom) Belle Vue Zoological Gardens, Belle Vue, Manchester | |
| 31 | Win | 27–4 | (United States) Billy Daniels | TD | 6 (10) | 21/02/1966 | (United States) Kezar Pavilion, San Francisco, California | |
| 30 | Win | 26–4 | (United States) Chuck Leslie | UD | 12 | 19/01/1966 | (United States) Kezar Pavilion, San Francisco, California | Won California Heavyweight Title |
| 29 | Loss | 25–4 | (United States) Amos Lincoln | SD | 10 | 22/11/1965 | (United States) Las Vegas Convention Center, Las Vegas, Nevada | |
| 28 | Win | 25–3 | (United States) Roger Rischer | UD | 12 | 26/04/1965 | (United States) San Francisco Civic Auditorium, San Francisco, California | |
| 27 | Win | 24–3 | (United States) Billy Daniels | UD | 10 | 17/03/1965 | (United States) Santa Monica Civic Auditorium, Santa Monica, California | |
| 26 | Win | 23–3 | (United States) Chuck Leslie | UD | 10 | 22/02/1965 | (United States) Santa Monica Civic Auditorium, Santa Monica, California | |
| 25 | Loss | 22–3 | (United States) Amos Lincoln | TKO | 9 (10) | 15/12/1964 | (United States) Santa Monica Civic Auditorium, Santa Monica, California | |
| 24 | Win | 22–2 | (United States) Tom McNeeley | KO | 5 (10) | 09/11/1964 | (United States) Santa Monica Civic Auditorium, Santa Monica, California | |
| 23 | Win | 21–2 | (United States) Ollie Wilson | TKO | 7 (10) | 13/10/1964 | (United States) Castaways Hotel and Casino, Las Vegas, Nevada | |
| 22 | Win | 20–2 | (United States) George Johnson | KO | 4 (10) | 04/08/1964 | (United States) Castaways Hotel and Casino, Las Vegas, Nevada | |
| 21 | Win | 19–2 | (United Kingdom) Ray Shiel | KO | 5 (8) | 05/07/1964 | (Sweden) Rasunda, Solna Municipality | |
| 20 | Loss | 18–2 | (United States) Chuck Leslie | PTS | 10 | 30/11/1963 | (United States) Reno, Nevada | |
| 19 | Win | 18–1 | (United States) Jim Fletcher | TKO | 6 (10) | 12/10/1963 | (United States) Santa Monica Civic Auditorium, Santa Monica, California | |
| 18 | Win | 17–1 | (United States) Jefferson Davis | UD | 10 | 01/08/1963 | (United States) Olympic Auditorium, Los Angeles, California | |
| 17 | Win | 16–1 | (United States) Monroe Ratliff | TKO | 9 (10) | 13/05/1963 | (United States) Moulin Rouge, Hollywood, California | |
| 16 | Win | 15–1 | (United States) Alvin Tiger | TKO | 5 (10) | 08/04/1963 | (United States) Moulin Rouge, Santa Monica, California | |
| 15 | Win | 14–1 | (United States) Leonard Dugan | UD | 10 | 20/10/1962 | (United States) Portland Memorial Coliseum, Portland, Oregon | |
| 14 | Win | 13–1 | (United States) Prince Bongoa | KO | 7 (8) | 09/10/1962 | (United States) San Jose, California | |
| 13 | Win | 12–1 | (United States) Otis Lee | PTS | 6 | 10/07/1962 | (United States) Sam Houston Coliseum, Houston, Texas | |
| 12 | Win | 11–1 | (United States) John Riggins | PTS | 6 | 28/05/1962 | (United States) San Francisco Civic Auditorium, San Francisco, California | |
| 11 | Win | 10–1 | (United States) Art Wright | KO | 2 (?) | 14/04/1962 | (United States) San Jose Civic Auditorium, San Jose, California | |
| 10 | Win | 9–1 | (United States) Dave Furch | PTS | 10 | 14/11/1961 | (United States) Santa Cruz Civic Auditorium, Santa Cruz, California | |
| 9 | Win | 8–1 | (United States) Lou Bailey | UD | 10 | 09/09/1961 | (United States) Portland Memorial Coliseum, Portland, Oregon | |
| 8 | Win | 7–1 | (United States) Jerry Gaines | TKO | 2 (10) | 11/07/1961 | (United States) Interstate Fairgrounds, Spokane, Washington | Referee stopped the bout at 2:59 of the second round. |
| 7 | Loss | 6–1 | (United States) Shirley Pembleton | PTS | 4 | 01/07/1961 | (United States) Boardwalk Hall, Atlantic City, New Jersey | |
| 6 | Win | 6–0 | (United States) John Riggins | UD | 6 | 04/05/1961 | (United States) Spokane Coliseum, Spokane, Washington | |
| 5 | Win | 5–0 | (United States) Yancy D. Smith | KO | 3 (6) | 10/04/1961 | (United States) Cow Palace, Daly City, California | |
| 4 | Win | 4–0 | (United States) Frankie Haynes | PTS | 10 | 21/03/1961 | (United States) San Jose, California | |
| 3 | Win | 3–0 | (United States) Harvey Taylor | PTS | 8 | 23/01/1961 | (United States) Seattle Civic Ice Arena, Seattle, Washington | |
| 2 | Win | 2–0 | Theo Lolanzo | PTS | 6 | 07/09/1960 | (United States) Sick's Stadium, Seattle, Washington | |
| 1 | Win | 1–0 | (United States) Frankie Rowe | TKO | 3 (4) | 03/05/1960 | (United States) Tacoma Armory, Tacoma, Washington | |
