= Sonny Banks =

American boxer

Personal information
- Born: Lucien Banks; June 29, 1940 Birmingham, Lee County, Mississippi, US
- Died: May 13, 1965 (aged 24)

Boxing career
- Stance: Orthodox

Boxing record
- Total fights: 25
- Wins: 18
- Win by KO: 14
- Losses: 7

Lucien "Sonny" Banks (June 29, 1940 – May 13, 1965) was an American boxer who is famously known for being the first boxer to ever knock down Cassius Clay (later "Muhammad Ali") in a professional match. In the early 1960s Banks was regarded in the sport as a rising prospect known for a lightning fast left hook, but his career was cut short when he died from head injuries sustained in the ring in 1965 against Leotis Martin.

== Early life ==
Banks was from Lee County in north east Mississippi. He was born in the farming community at Birmingham Ridge, about halfway between Tupelo and Saltillo.

== Boxing career ==
He fought Cassius Clay on 10 February 1962 in New York, and knocked him down for a count, although he went on to lose the match.

== Death ==
Banks died on 13 May 1965 at the age of 24 from head injuries sustained three days earlier in a 9-round bout against Leotis Martin.

== Professional boxing record ==
18 Wins (14 knockouts, 4 decisions), 7 Losses (5 knockouts, 2 decisions)
Result	Record	Opponent	Type	Round	Date	Location	Notes
Loss	18–7	(United States) Leotis Martin	KO	9	1965-05-10	(United States) Philadelphia Arena, Philadelphia, Pennsylvania, U.S.	Banks died three days later from injuries sustained during the fight.
Loss	18–6	(United States) Cleveland Williams	KO	6	1964-07-21	(United States) Houston, Texas, U.S.	
Win	18–5	(United States) Don Warner	KO	1	1964-05-18	(United States) Philadelphia Arena, Philadelphia, Pennsylvania, U.S.	
Win	17–5	(United States) Lee Batts	KO	2	1964-03-16	(United States) Philadelphia Arena, Philadelphia, Pennsylvania, U.S.	Batts knocked out at 1:08 of the second round.
Loss	16–5	(United States) Lee Batts	SD	10	1963-11-29	(United States) Battle Creek, Michigan, U.S.	
Win	16–4	(United States) David E. Bailey	SD	10	1963-10-18	(United States) Cobo Arena, Detroit, Michigan, U.S.	
Win	15–4	(United States) Jim Jones	UD	8	1963-07-06	(United States) Madison Square Garden, New York City, New York, U.S.	
Win	14–4	(United States) Freddie Mack	SD	10	1963-06-05	(United States) Graystone Ballroom, Detroit, Michigan, U.S.	
Win	13–4	(United States) Leroy Roker	TKO	6	1963-03-15	(United States) Graystone Ballroom, Detroit, Michigan, U.S.	Referee stopped the bout at 0:40 of the sixth round.
Win	12–4	(United States) Lou Bailey	KO	1	1963-02-09	(United States) Graystone Ballroom, Detroit, Michigan, U.S.	
Win	11–4	(United States) Gene Jackson	KO	3	1962-07-28	(United States) Graystone Ballroom, Detroit, Michigan, U.S.	Jackson knocked out at 2:02 of the third round.
Loss	10–4	(United States) Young Jack Johnson	KO	5	1962-05-26	(United States) Graystone Ballroom, Detroit, Michigan, U.S.	
Loss	10–3	(United States) Cassius Clay	TKO	4	1962-02-10	(United States) Madison Square Garden, New York City, New York, U.S.	Referee stopped the bout at 0:26 of the fourth round.
Win	10–2	(United States) Clay Thomas	KO	2	1962-01-27	(United States) Graystone Ballroom, Detroit, Michigan, U.S.	
Win	9–2	(United States) Tunney Hunsaker	KO	2	1961-10-16	(United States) Detroit, Michigan, U.S.	
Win	8–2	(United States) Willie Coleman	TKO	5	1961-08-07	(United States) Graystone Ballroom, Detroit, Michigan, U.S.	Michigan Heavyweight Title.
Win	7–2	(United States) Joe Shelton	KO	2	1961-06-06	(United States) Graystone Ballroom, Detroit, Michigan, U.S.	
Win	6–2	(United States) Herman Wilson	KO	1	1961-04-25	(United States) Graystone Ballroom, Detroit, Michigan, U.S.	
Loss	5–2	(United States) Chuck Garrett	PTS	5	1961-02-06	(United States) Marigold Gardens, Chicago, Illinois, U.S.	
Loss	5–1	(United States) Joe Shelton	KO	3	1960-10-11	(United States) Graystone Ballroom, Detroit, Michigan, U.S.	
Win	5–0	(United States) Rufus Handsome	KO	1	1960-09-23	(United States) Detroit Olympia, Detroit, Michigan, U.S.	
Win	4–0	(United States) Chico Gardner	KO	4	1960-08-31	(United States) Chicago Stadium, Chicago, Illinois, U.S.	
Win	3–0	(United States) Ted Davis	KO	1	1960-08-18	(United States) Graystone Ballroom, Detroit, Michigan, U.S.	
Win	2–0	(United States) Lloyd Washington	KO	1	1960-07-12	Peace Bridge Arena, Fort Erie, Ontario, Canada	
Win	1–0	(United States) Ernie Berthet Jr.	PTS	4	1960-05-19	(United States) Detroit, Michigan, U.S.	
