= Muhammad Ali vs. Brian London =

Boxing competition

- Date: 6 August 1966
- Venue: Earls Court Arena, Hammersmith and Fulham, London, UK
- Title(s) on the line: WBC, NYSAC, and The Ring heavyweight titles

Tale of the tape
Boxer	(United States) Muhammad Ali	(United Kingdom) Brian London
Nickname	"The Greatest"	"The Blackpool Rock"
Hometown	Louisville, Kentucky, U.S.	Blackpool, Lancashire, UK
Purse	$252,000	$112,000
Pre-fight record	24–0 (19 KO)	35–13 (26 KO)
Age	24 years, 6 months	32 years, 1 month
Height	6 ft 3 in (191 cm)	6 ft 0 in (183 cm)
Weight	209 1/2 lb (95 kg)	201 1/2 lb (91 kg)
Style	Orthodox	Orthodox
Recognition	WBC, NYSAC, and The Ring heavyweight champion	Former British and Commonwealth heavyweight champion

Result
- Ali won via 3rd round KO

Muhammad Ali vs. Brian London was a professional boxing match contested on 6 August 1966, for the WBC, NYSAC, and The Ring heavyweight championship. The match took place at Earls Court Arena, London, England on 6 August 1966. It was scheduled for fifteen rounds. The match ended in the third round with Ali defeating London by knockout.

== Background ==
Speaking before the bout London appeared unfazed by Ali's typical taunts, saying "Clay insult me …. no way. I’m too ignorant." He would conceded that the champion would be the superior boxer but warned that: "Clay may cut me, out-box me, or even beat me. But I’ll be there at the end, thumping."

== The fight ==
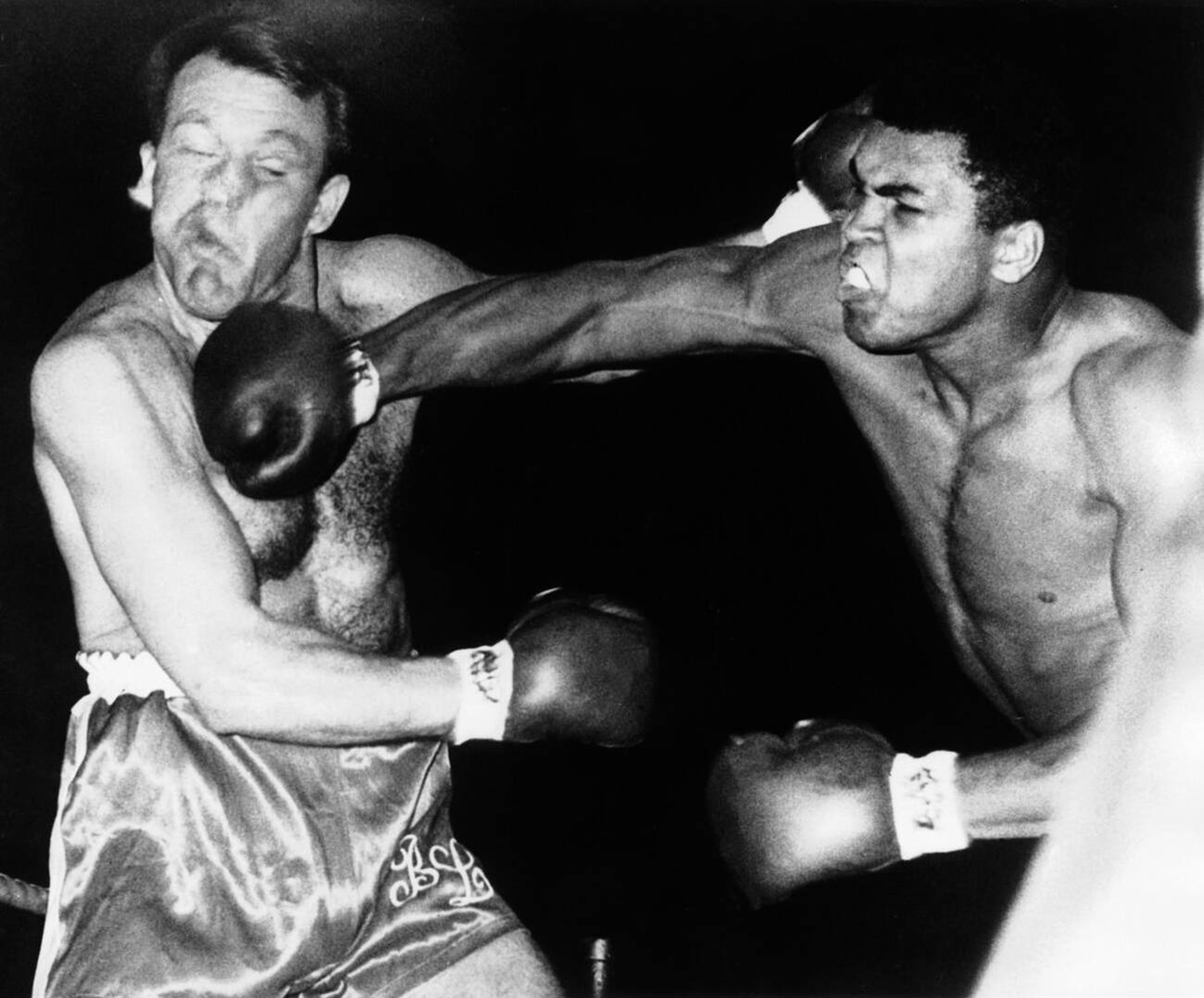
Ali landing against London

Ali at 24 years old put on a masterful performance against a clearly out-classed 32 year old opponent, with Ali having the advantages of height, weight, reach and youth on his side, almost hitting London at will as the fight went on. As London put it in an interview with the BBC: "he was just getting through all the time".

Ali bouncingly circled continually, whilst London tracked doggedly after him for the first two rounds seemingly with a strategy of trying to land a single knock-out punch to the American champion. London succeeded in landing only one blow in the match, a left jab to Ali's jaw midway through the 1st Round which caught Ali by surprise and left him for a moment stunned (and wide-open for a follow through right cross, which London failed to take advantage of), but the blow lacked weight and Ali was able to quickly recover.

On coming out for the 3rd Round London displayed a patent degree of hesitation to come forward to engage, and Ali sensing this advanced to the attack, penning him back into a corner and throwing a 12-punch combination in three seconds in a showboating display of speed and athleticism, but with a suspicion of Ali holding back, with few of the blows actually connecting or possessing weight behind them, and the one blow that did (the 10th) being just enough to knock London down and end the fight.

== Aftermath ==
In a post-career media interview London described his contest with Ali in stark terms, describing Ali as being:

"Big, fast and he could punch, whereas I was smaller, fatter and couldn't punch. He stopped me in three rounds and that was it, I don't think I hit him. It was good money and I got well paid for it - that's all I fought for. Every fight I ever had I always had a go, but with Muhammad Ali I thought don't get hurt Brian, and I therefore didn't try, which was wrong, totally wrong."

== Undercard ==
Confirmed bouts:

== Broadcasting ==
Country	Broadcaster
Philippines	CBN 9
United Kingdom	ITV
United States	ABC

Preceded by vs. Henry Cooper II	Muhammad Ali's bouts 6 August 1966	Succeeded by vs. Karl Mildenberger
Preceded by vs. Amos Johnson	Brian London's bouts 6 August 1966	Succeeded by vs. Jerry Quarry
