= Muhammad Ali vs. Karl Mildenberger =

Boxing match

- Date: 10 September 1966
- Venue: Waldstadion, Frankfurt, Hesse, West Germany
- Title(s) on the line: WBC, NYSAC, and The Ring heavyweight titles

Tale of the tape
Boxer	(United States) Muhammad Ali	(Germany) Karl Mildenberger
Nickname	"The Greatest"	"Milde"
Hometown	Louisville, Kentucky, U.S.	Kaiserslautern, Rhineland-Palatinate, West Germany
Purse	$300,000	$100,000
Pre-fight record	25–0 (20 KO)	49–2–3 (17 KO)
Age	24 years, 7 months	28 years, 9 months
Height	6 ft 3 in (191 cm)	6 ft 1 1/2 in (187 cm)
Weight	204 lb (93 kg)	195 lb (88 kg)
Style	Orthodox	Southpaw
Recognition	WBC, NYSAC, and The Ring heavyweight champion	WBA; No. 5 Ranked Heavyweight; European Heavyweight Champion

Result
- Ali won via 12th round TKO

Muhammad Ali vs. Karl Mildenberger was a professional boxing match contested on 10 September 1966, for the WBC, NYSAC, and The Ring heavyweight championship.

This was the champion's sixth title defense since winning the world title in 1964. Ali stopped Mildenberger in the 12th round.

== Background ==
The fight held several historic firsts, this included the location. Being held in Frankfurt, this was Germany's first time hosting a world heavyweight title fight in the country. Mildenberger would also be the first southpaw to get a heavyweight title shot. The fight would serve as the first ever sports event that was broadcast live via satellite through a color telecast.

Ali was given 10:1 on odds of defeating the European Champion, and a crowd of over 40,000 spectators attended the fight.

== The fight ==
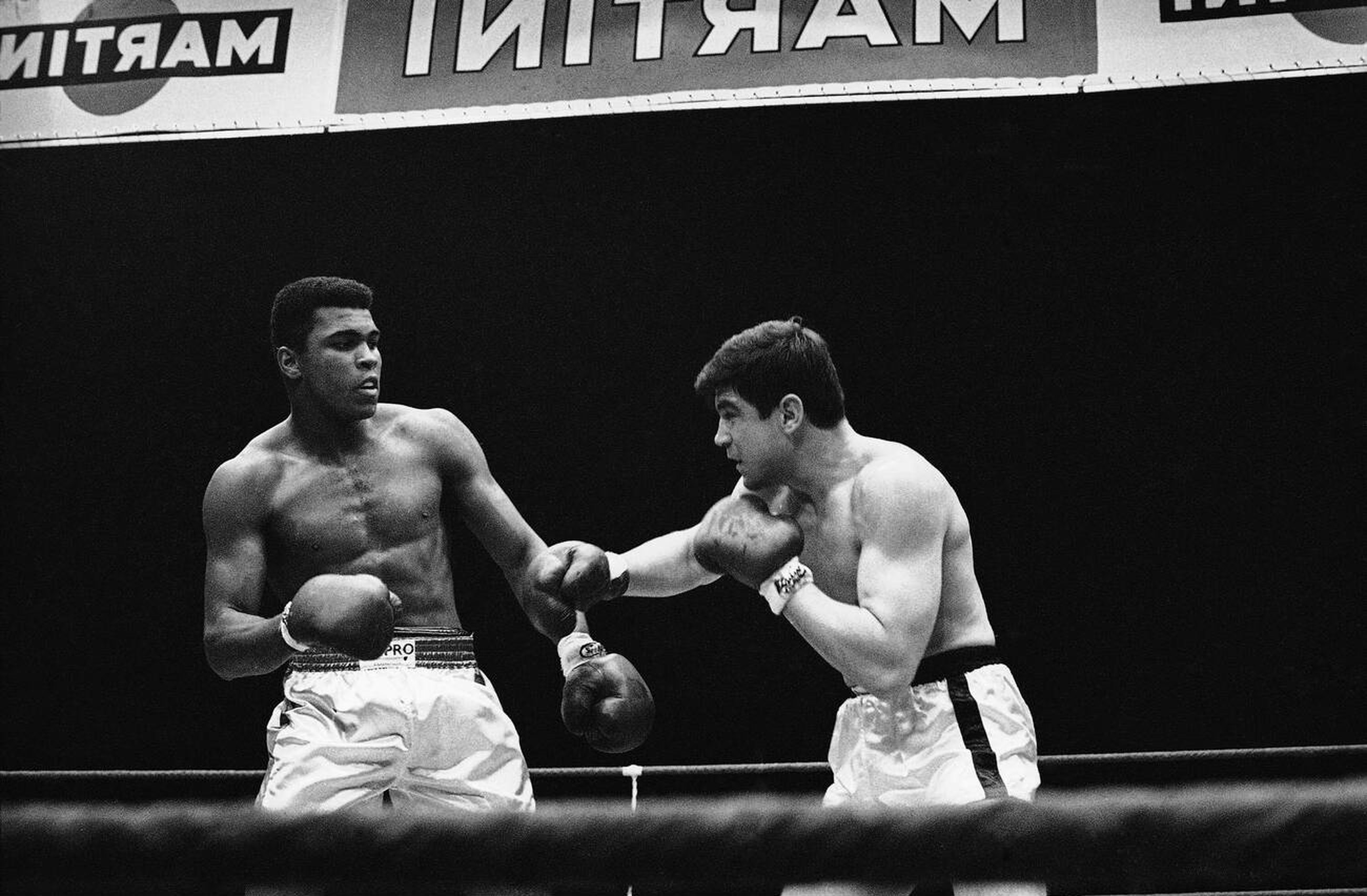
Ali facing Mildenberger

At first, Mildenberger's unorthodox southpaw style caused Ali some surprising discomfort in the early rounds of the bout, a sight rarely seen by the champion. Despite the early difficulties, Ali quickly adjusted, and by the mid rounds had taken full control of the fight. Mildenberger's left eye was cut in the sixth round, and by the end of round eight it had completely swollen shut. Ali also scored three knockdowns over the course of the fight (in the fifth, eighth and tenth rounds), although Mildenberger managed to beat the count each time. The fight finally came to an end when the referee stopped the fight halfway through the 12th round. The technical knockout would be Ali's 21st knockout victory in just 26 fights.

== Aftermath ==
Years later, Angelo Dundee said a tenth round punch to the liver area hurt Ali, whose ability to withstand body blows was legendary.

== Undercard ==
Confirmed bouts:

== Broadcasting ==
Country	Broadcaster
Philippines	CBN 9
United States	ABC

Preceded by vs. Brian London	Muhammad Ali's bouts 10 September 1966	Succeeded by vs. Cleveland Williams
Preceded by vs. Ivan Prebeg	Karl Mildenberger's bouts 10 September 1966	Succeeded by vs. Piero Tomasoni
