= Karl Mildenberger =

German boxer (1937–2018)

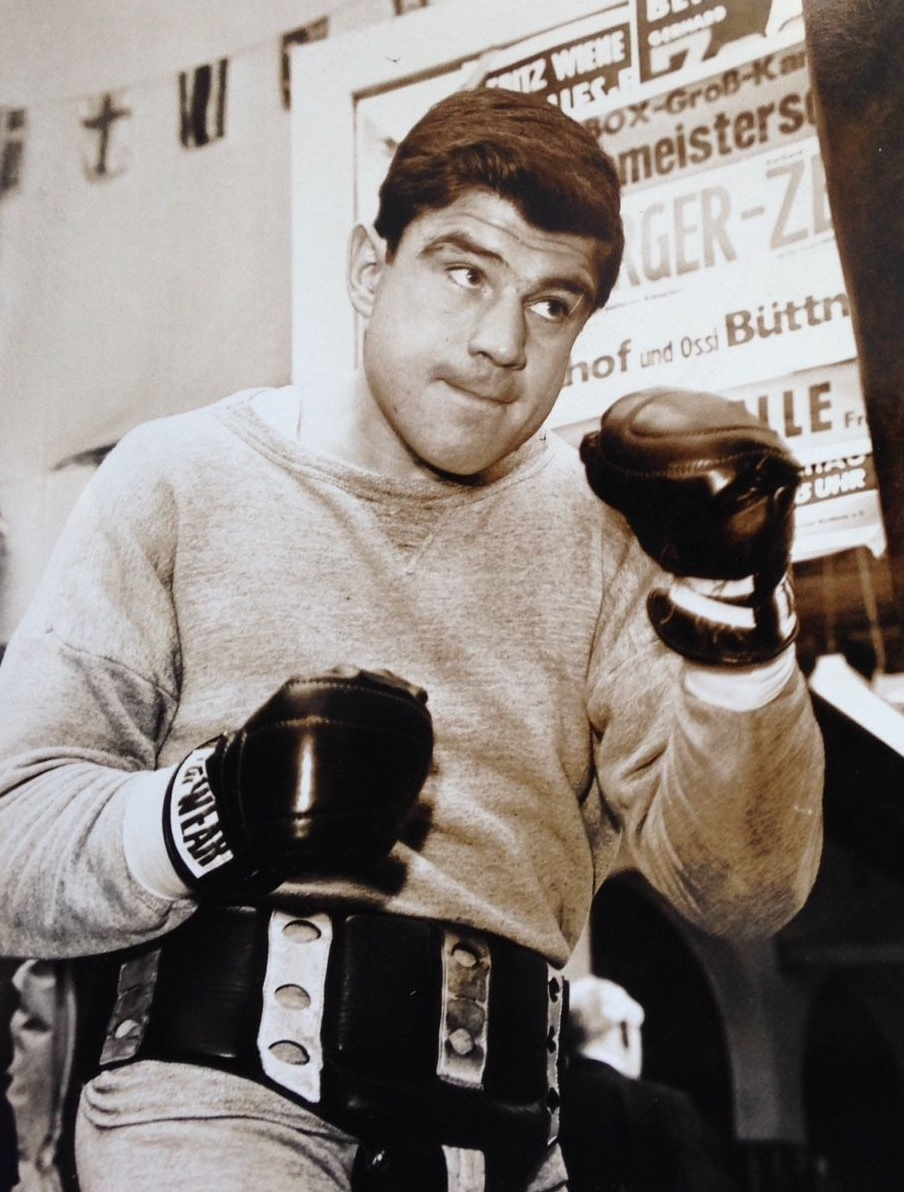
- Mildenberger in 1966

Personal information
- Nickname: Milde
- Nationality: German
- Born: Karl Mildenberger; 23 November 1937 Kaiserslautern, Germany
- Died: 4 October 2018 (aged 80) Kaiserslautern, Germany
- Height: 6 ft 1 1/2 in (1.87 m)
- Weight: Heavyweight

Boxing career
- Stance: Southpaw

Boxing record
- Total fights: 62
- Wins: 53
- Win by KO: 19
- Losses: 6
- Draws: 3

Karl Mildenberger (23 November 1937 – 4 October 2018) was a German heavyweight boxer. He was the European heavyweight champion from 1964 to 1968, during which he retained the title six times. He unsuccessfully challenged Muhammad Ali for the world heavyweight title in September 1966, and was the first Southpaw to challenge for the Heavyweight Championship.

== Biography ==
Mildenberger learned the fight trade growing up in Occupied Germany. A cousin of his father's, a former boxing champion during the Third Reich, began Karl's fistic education; he then joined the boxing programme run by FC Kaiserslautern. He eventually displayed enough promise to be sent to Mannheim for training, as Mildenberger lived in the French Sector of the occupation, which forbade the practice of prizefighting; Mannheim, in the American Sector, had no such restriction.

Mildenberger lost his first fight for the European heavyweight title when he was knocked out by Welsh boxer Dick Richardson in one round in April 1962. Mildenberger rebounded with wins over Joe Erskine, Archie McBride, Joe Bygraves and a knockout win over Billy Daniels. Mildenberger then got a draw with highly ranked Zora Folley in April 1964. Later that year, he scored a first-round knockout over Sante Amonte to capture the European heavyweight title.

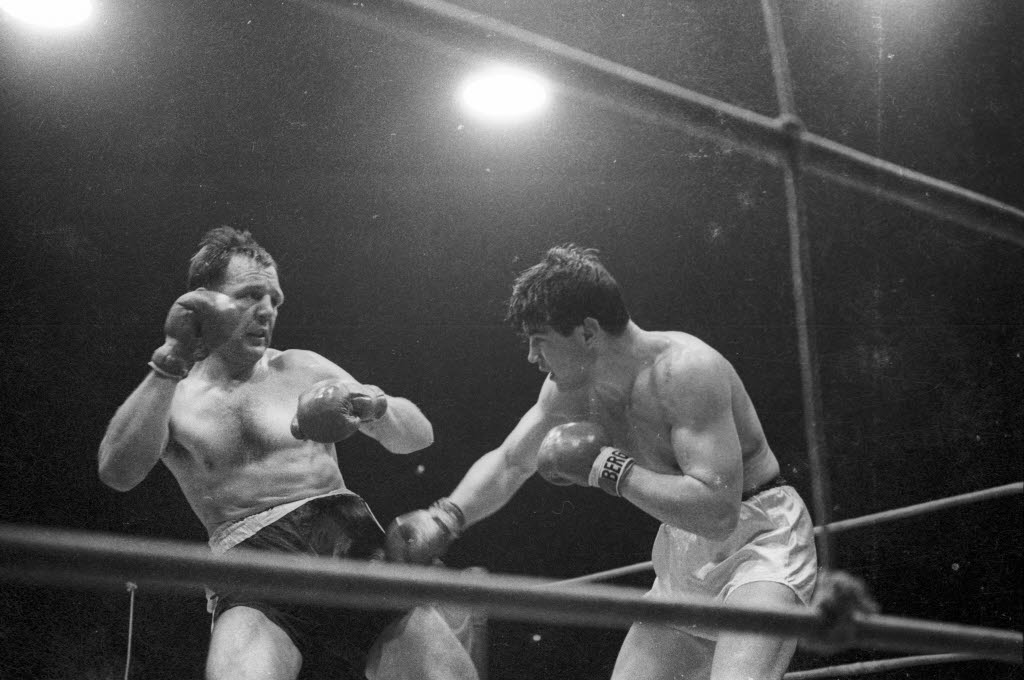
Mildenberger (right) fighting Ulrich Ritter in 1963

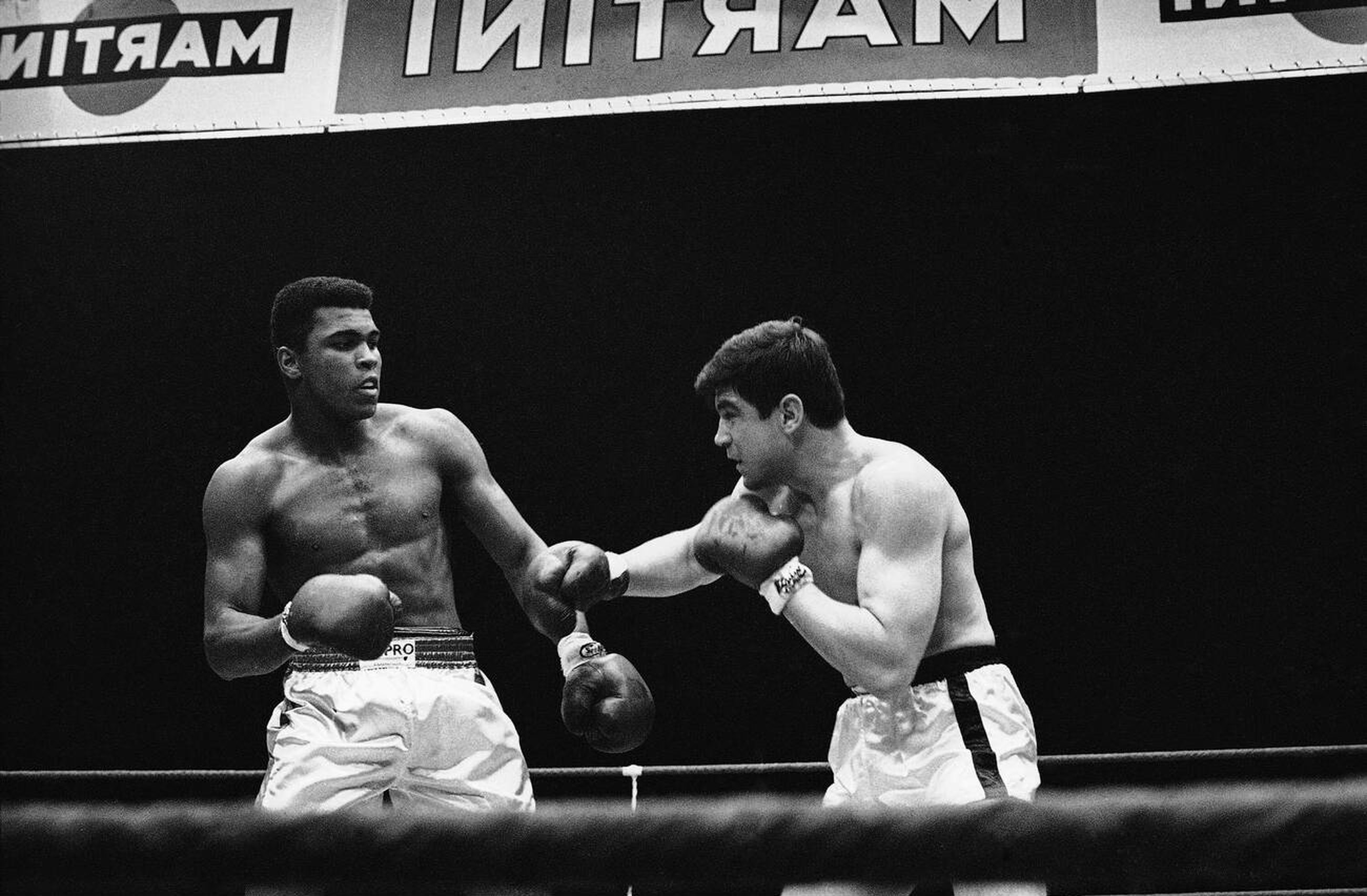
Mildenberger fighting Ali in 1966

After defending his European title three times, Mildenberger fought Muhammad Ali for the world heavyweight title in September 1966. Mildenberger, the first southpaw to fight for the world heavyweight title, frustrated Ali for most of the fight, but ultimately lost by TKO when the referee stopped the fight at 1:28 of the twelfth round following a flurry of punches by Ali. Years later, Angelo Dundee said a tenth round punch to the liver area hurt Ali, whose ability to withstand body blows was legendary.

In 1967, Mildenberger participated in a tournament staged by the World Boxing Association to determine the new heavyweight champion after Ali was stripped of the title for refusing induction into the US military draft. In the first round of the tournament, getting off the deck, he lost to Oscar Bonavena by a clear twelve-round decision.

Mildenberger was not the same afterwards, and was knocked out by contender Leotis Martin in seven rounds (April 1968). Subsequently, in September 1968, his career ended when he lost the European heavyweight title to Henry Cooper by eighth round disqualification after headbutting his opponent. Mildenberger has said of his timing of retirement, "If I had retained the title, I would have relinquished it. Win, lose or draw, I would have retired, anyway. ... This was the end. I was unharmed. No terrible things had happened to me."

Mildenberger worked as a lifeguard after his retirement from boxing. He died at the age of 80 on 4 October 2018.

== Professional boxing record ==
62 fights	53 wins	6 losses
By knockout	19	4
By decision	34	1
By disqualification	0	1
Draws	3	

No.	Result	Record	Opponent	Type	Round	Date	Location	Notes
62	Loss	53–6–3	(United Kingdom) Henry Cooper	DQ	8	18 September 1968	(United Kingdom) Empire Pool, London, England	Lost European Heavyweight Title; Mildenberger disqualified for an illegal headbutt
61	Loss	53–5–3	(United States) Leotis Martin	KO	7	5 April 1968	Festhalle Frankfurt, Frankfurt, Germany	
60	Win	53–4–3	(Germany) Gerhard Zech	PTS	15	30 December 1967	(Germany) Sportpalast, Schoeneberg, Berlin	Retained European Heavyweight Title
59	Loss	52–4–3	(Argentina) Oscar Bonavena	UD	12	16 September 1967	Waldstadion, Frankfurt, Germany	WBA Heavyweight Title elimination series; quarter-finals; Mildenberger-Bonavena, Quarry-Patterson, Terrell-Spencer, Ellis-Martin
58	Win	52–3–3	(United States) Amos Lincoln	TKO	6	6 May 1967	Festhalle Frankfurt, Frankfurt, Germany	
57	Win	51–3–3	(United Kingdom) Billy Walker	TKO	8	21 March 1967	(United Kingdom) Empire Pool, London, England	Retained European Heavyweight Title
56	Win	50–3–3	(Italy) Piero Tomasoni	PTS	15	1 February 1967	Festhalle Frankfurt, Frankfurt, Germany	Retained European Heavyweight Titles
55	Loss	49–3–3	(United States) Muhammad Ali	TKO	12	10 September 1966	Waldstadion, Frankfurt, Germany	For WBC, NYSAC, and The Ring Heavyweight Titles
54	Win	49–2–3	(Croatia) Ivan Prebeg	PTS	15	15 June 1966	Festhalle Frankfurt, Frankfurt, Germany	Retained European Heavyweight Title
53	Win	48–2–3	(United States) Eddie Machen	PTS	10	3 February 1966	Festhalle Frankfurt, Frankfurt, Germany	
52	Win	47–2–3	(Germany) Gerhard Zech	PTS	15	26 November 1965	Festhalle Frankfurt, Frankfurt, Germany	Retained European Heavyweight Title
51	Win	46–2–3	(United States) David E. Bailey	PTS	10	10 September 1965	(Germany) Ernst Merck Halle, Hamburg	
50	Win	45–2–3	(Italy) Piero Tomasoni	PTS	15	14 May 1965	Festhalle Frankfurt, Frankfurt, Germany	Retained European Heavyweight Title
49	Win	44–2–3	(United States) Kirk Barrow	KO	5	9 April 1965	(Germany) Ernst Merck Halle, Hamburg	
48	Win	43–2–3	(United States) Jefferson Davis	PTS	10	22 January 1965	Festhalle Frankfurt, Frankfurt, Germany	
47	Win	42–2–3	(United States) Ollie Wilson	TKO	4	4 December 1964	Festhalle Frankfurt, Frankfurt, Germany	
46	Draw	41–2–3	(United States) Amos Johnson	PTS	10	20 November 1964	(Germany) Deutschlandhalle, Charlottenburg, Berlin	
45	Win	41–2–2	(Italy) Santo Amonti	KO	1	17 October 1964	(Germany) Deutschlandhalle, Charlottenburg, Berlin	Won vacant European Heavyweight Title
44	Draw	40–2–2	(United States) Zora Folley	PTS	10	17 April 1964	Festhalle Frankfurt, Frankfurt, Germany	
43	Win	40–2–1	(United States) Archie McBride	PTS	10	25 January 1964	(Germany) Sportpalast, Schoeneberg, Berlin	
42	Win	39–2–1	(United States) Billy Daniels	KO	3	29 November 1963	Festhalle Frankfurt, Frankfurt, Germany	
41	Win	38–2–1	(Wales) Joe Erskine	PTS	10	13 October 1963	Westfalenhallen, Dortmund, Germany	
40	Win	37–2–1	(United States) Wayne Bethea	PTS	10	6 July 1963	(Germany) Deutschlandhalle, Charlottenburg, Berlin	
39	Win	36–2–1	(United States) Von Clay	PTS	10	10 May 1963	(Germany) Deutschlandhalle, Charlottenburg, Berlin	
38	Win	35–2–1	(Germany) Ulli Ritter	PTS	10	20 April 1963	Ostseehalle, Kiel, Germany	
37	Draw	34–2–1	(United States) Archie McBride	PTS	10	26 January 1963	(Germany) Sportpalast, Schoeneberg, Berlin	
36	Win	34–2	(Jamaica) Joe Bygraves	PTS	3	30 November 1962	Festhalle Frankfurt, Frankfurt, Germany	
35	Win	33–2	(United States) Alonzo Johnson	PTS	10	17 November 1962	Westfalenhallen, Dortmund, Germany	
34	Win	32–2	(Sweden) John Robert Henry	PTS	8	6 October 1962	Messesporthalle, Cologne, Germany	
33	Win	31–2	(Italy) Federico Friso	PTS	10	1 September 1962	Messesporthalle, Cologne, Germany	
32	Loss	30–2	(Wales) Dick Richardson	KO	1	24 February 1962	Westfalenhallen, Dortmund, Germany	For European Heavyweight Title
31	Win	30–1	(United States) Pete Rademacher	PTS	10	20 January 1962	Westfalenhallen, Dortmund, Germany	
30	Win	29–1	(United States) Howard King	PTS	10	24 November 1961	Festhalle Frankfurt, Frankfurt, Germany	
29	Win	28–1	(United States) Wayne Bethea	PTS	10	3 November 1961	(Germany) Ernst Merck Halle, Hamburg	
28	Win	27–1	(United States) Young Jack Johnson	PTS	10	29 September 1961	(Germany) Sportpalast, Schoeneberg, Berlin	
27	Win	26–1	(Spain) José González Sales	KO	2	10 September 1961	Eisstadion, Cologne, Germany	
26	Win	25–1	(Germany) Walter Haufft	TKO	2	3 June 1961	Eisstadion, Cologne, Germany	
25	Win	24–1	(United States) Frankie Daniels	PTS	10	28 April 1961	(Germany) Sportpalast, Schoeneberg, Berlin	
24	Win	23–1	(Sweden) Törner Åhsman	TKO	4	17 March 1961	(Germany) Sportpalast, Schoeneberg, Berlin	
23	Win	22–1	(United States) Hal Carter	TKO	8	20 January 1961	(Germany) Sportpalast, Schoeneberg, Berlin	
22	Win	21–1	(Italy) Franco Cavicchi	PTS	10	7 December 1960	Bologna, Italy	
21	Win	20–1	(Germany) Hans Friedrich	TKO	3	26 November 1960	Festhalle Frankfurt, Frankfurt, Germany	
20	Win	19–1	(Ghana) Robert Archie Moore	PTS	8	29 October 1960	Ostseehalle, Kiel, Germany	
19	Win	18–1	(Belgium) Alain Cherville	TKO	4	1 October 1960	Westfalenhallen, Dortmund, Germany	
18	Win	17–1	(United Kingdom) Alex Buxton	PTS	8	6 May 1960	(Germany) Ernst Merck Halle, Mitte, Berlin	
17	Win	16–1	(France) Francois Kania	KO	3	22 April 1960	Ostseehalle, Kiel, Germany	
16	Win	15–1	(Nigeria) Sammy Langford	TKO	3	8 April 1960	(Germany) Sportpalast, Schoeneberg, Berlin	
15	Win	14–1	(United Kingdom) Ron Redrup	TKO	7	13 February 1960	Killesbergpark, Stuttgart, Germany	
14	Win	13–1	(United States) Jimmy Slade	PTS	8	30 December 1959	(Germany) Sportpalast, Schoeneberg, Berlin	
13	Win	12–1	(Netherlands) Wim Snoek	PTS	8	12 December 1959	Killesbergpark, Stuttgart, Germany	
12	Loss	11–1	(Germany) Helmut Ball	KO	7	7 November 1959	Killesbergpark, Stuttgart, Germany	
11	Win	11–0	(United Kingdom) Arthur Howard	PTS	8	4 July 1959	(Germany) Deutschlandhalle, Charlottenburg, Berlin	
10	Win	10–0	(Netherlands) Wim Snoek	PTS	8	6 June 1959	Killesbergpark, Stuttgart, Germany	
9	Win	9–0	(France) Jacques Bro	KO	5	9 May 1959	Killesbergpark, Stuttgart, Germany	
8	Win	8–0	(Netherlands) Pedro Klijssen	PTS	8	24 April 1959	Grugahalle, Essen, Germany	
7	Win	7–0	(Belgium) Alain Cherville	PTS	8	14 March 1959	Killesbergpark, Stuttgart, Germany	
6	Win	6–0	(Belgium) Louis DeBolster	KO	3	14 February 1959	Landwirtschaftshalle, Kaiserslautern, Germany	
5	Win	5–0	(Belgium) Andre Wyns	PTS	8	13 December 1958	Killesbergpark, Stuttgart, Germany	
4	Win	4–0	(Spain) Jose Mariano Moracia Ibanes	PTS	8	5 December 1958	Bayernhalle, Munich, Germany	
3	Win	3–0	(France) Andre Oueille	TKO	5	15 November 1958	Killesbergpark, Stuttgart, Germany	
2	Win	2–0	(Germany) Guenter Huber	PTS	4	9 November 1958	Schwarzwaldhalle, Karlsruhe, Germany	
1	Win	1–0	(Germany) Manfred Striemer	KO	1	15 October 1958	Killesbergpark, Stuttgart, Germany	

== Exhibition boxing record ==
1 fight	0 wins	0 losses
Non-scored	1	

No.	Result	Record	Opponent	Type	Round, time	Date	Location	Notes
1	—N/a	0–0 (1)	(United States) Muhammad Ali	—N/a	2	Jun 4, 1979	Grugahalle, Essen, West Germany	Non-scored bout

== Bibliography ==
- Brunt, Stephen (2002). Facing Ali. Guilford, CT: The Lyons Press. ISBN 1-58574-829-3.
