= Henry Cooper =

British boxer (1934–2011)

Sir Henry Cooper OBE KSG
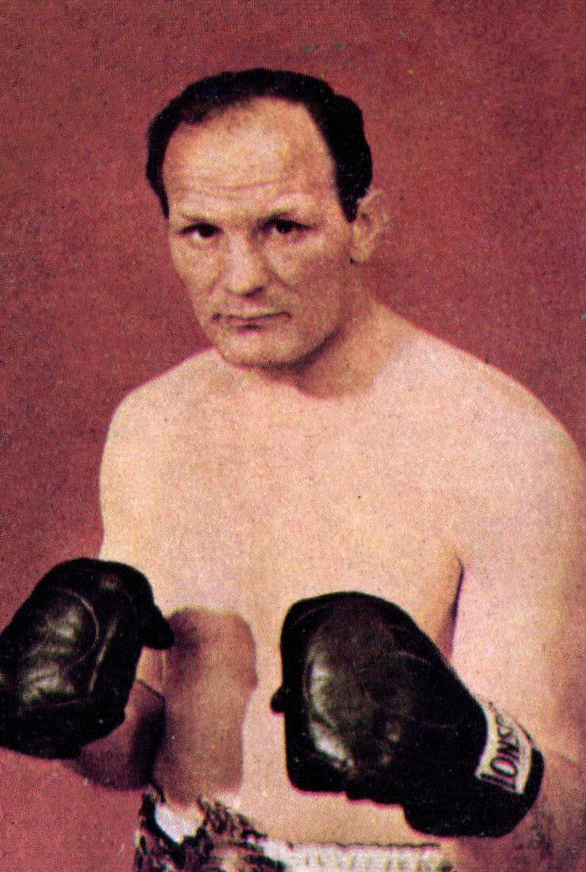
- Cooper c. 1969

Personal information
- Nickname: Our 'Enry
- Nationality: English
- Born: 3 May 1934 Lambeth, London, England
- Died: 1 May 2011 (aged 76) Limpsfield, Surrey, England
- Height: 6 ft 1 1/2 in (187 cm)
- Weight: Heavyweight
- Spouse: Albina Genepri (m. 1960; died 2008)
- Children: 2

Boxing career
- Reach: 75 in (191 cm)
- Stance: Orthodox

Boxing record
- Total fights: 55
- Wins: 40
- Win by KO: 27
- Losses: 14
- Draws: 1
Medal record
Men's amateur boxing
English National Championships
Gold medal – first place	1952 London	Light-heavyweight
Gold medal – first place	1953 London	Light-heavyweight

Sir Henry Cooper (3 May 1934 – 1 May 2011) was a British professional boxer. He was undefeated in British and Commonwealth heavyweight championship contests for twelve years and held the European heavyweight title for three years. In a 1963 fight against Cassius Clay (later known as Muhammad Ali), he famously knocked Clay down in round 4, before the fight was stopped by the referee, Tommy Little, in round 5 because of a cut to Cooper's left eye.

In 1966 he fought Ali for a second time. Ali was now world heavyweight champion. However, Cooper again lost by TKO. Cooper was twice voted BBC Sports Personality of the Year and, after retiring in 1971 following a controversial loss to Joe Bugner, remained a popular public figure. He is the only British boxer to have been awarded a knighthood.

== Early life ==
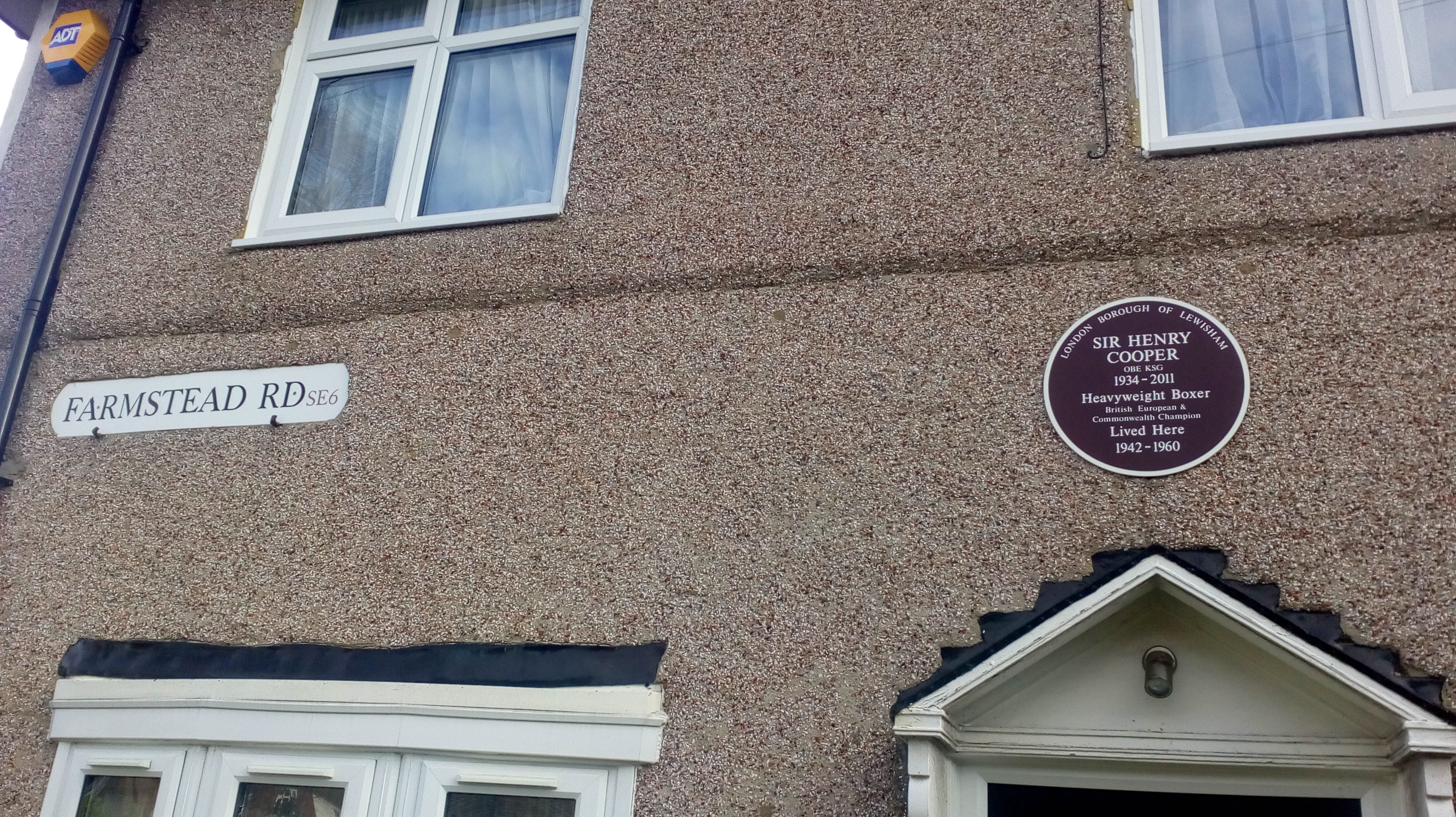
Plaque showing former home of heavyweight boxing champion Henry Cooper at 120 Farmstead Road, Bellingham, London Borough of Lewisham

Cooper was born on Thursday, 3 May 1934 in Lambeth, London to Henry Snr and Lily Cooper. With identical twin brother, George (1934–2010), and elder brother Bern, he grew up in a council house on Farmstead Road on the Bellingham Estate in South East London. During the Second World War they were evacuated to Lancing on the Sussex coast.

Life was tough in the latter years of the Second World War, and London life especially brought many dangers during the blackout. Cooper took up many jobs, including a paper round before school, and made money out of recycling golf balls to the clubhouse on the Beckenham course. All three of the Cooper brothers excelled in sport, with George and Henry exercising talents particularly in football and also cricket. Cooper started his boxing career in 1949, as an amateur with the Bellingham Boxing Club based at Athelney St School in Bellingham, which had been founded and was run by Albert Colley, and won seventy-three of eighty-four contests. At the age of seventeen he won the first of two ABA light-heavyweight titles before National Service in the Royal Army Ordnance Corps as Private Service Number 22486464.

=== 1952 Olympics ===
Cooper represented Great Britain as a light heavyweight boxer at the 1952 Helsinki Olympics. His results were: Round of 32-bye, Round of 16-lost to Anatoly Perov (Soviet Union) by decision, 1–2.

== Professional boxing career ==
=== Style ===
Although Cooper was left-handed, he used the "orthodox" stance, with his strongest (left) hand and foot forward, rather than the reversed "southpaw" stance more usually adopted by a left-handed boxer. Opponents were thus hit hardest with punches which Cooper could throw from his front hand, closest to the opponent. At its most effective, his hook - dubbed "Enry's 'Ammer" ("Henry's hammer") - had an upward uppercut-like trajectory. A formidable left jab, from which he could hook quickly, completed his offensive repertoire. While cut-prone and no great defensive technician, Cooper compensated by forcing the action in his bouts. After developing a left shoulder problem in the latter half of his career, he adjusted to put more power on right-handed punches.

=== Early bouts ===
Henry and his identical twin brother, George (boxing under the name Jim), turned professional together under the management of Jim Wicks. Wicks had a reputation for not overmatching his boxers and looking out for their interests. However the very cut-prone Cooper was slow to fulfil his potential and early title challenges were unsuccessful, with losses to West Indian Joe Bygraves for the Commonwealth belt (KO 9), Ingemar Johansson for the European belt (KO 5), and the undersized but highly skilled Joe Erskine (PTS 15) for the British and Commonwealth. An impressive points win over top American heavyweight Zora Folley was followed by a second-round KO loss to Folley about 3 years later in their rematch.

=== British and Commonwealth Champion ===
For Cooper 1959 was a banner year: he took the British and Commonwealth titles from Brian London in 15 rounds and received the last 9-carat gold Lonsdale Belt after successful defences against Dick Richardson (KO 5), Joe Erskine (TKO 5, TKO 12, and TKO 9), and Johnny Prescott (RTD 10). Another points win over London brought an offer to fight Floyd Patterson for his world heavyweight title, but this was turned down by Cooper (or Wicks).

=== Muhammad Ali ===
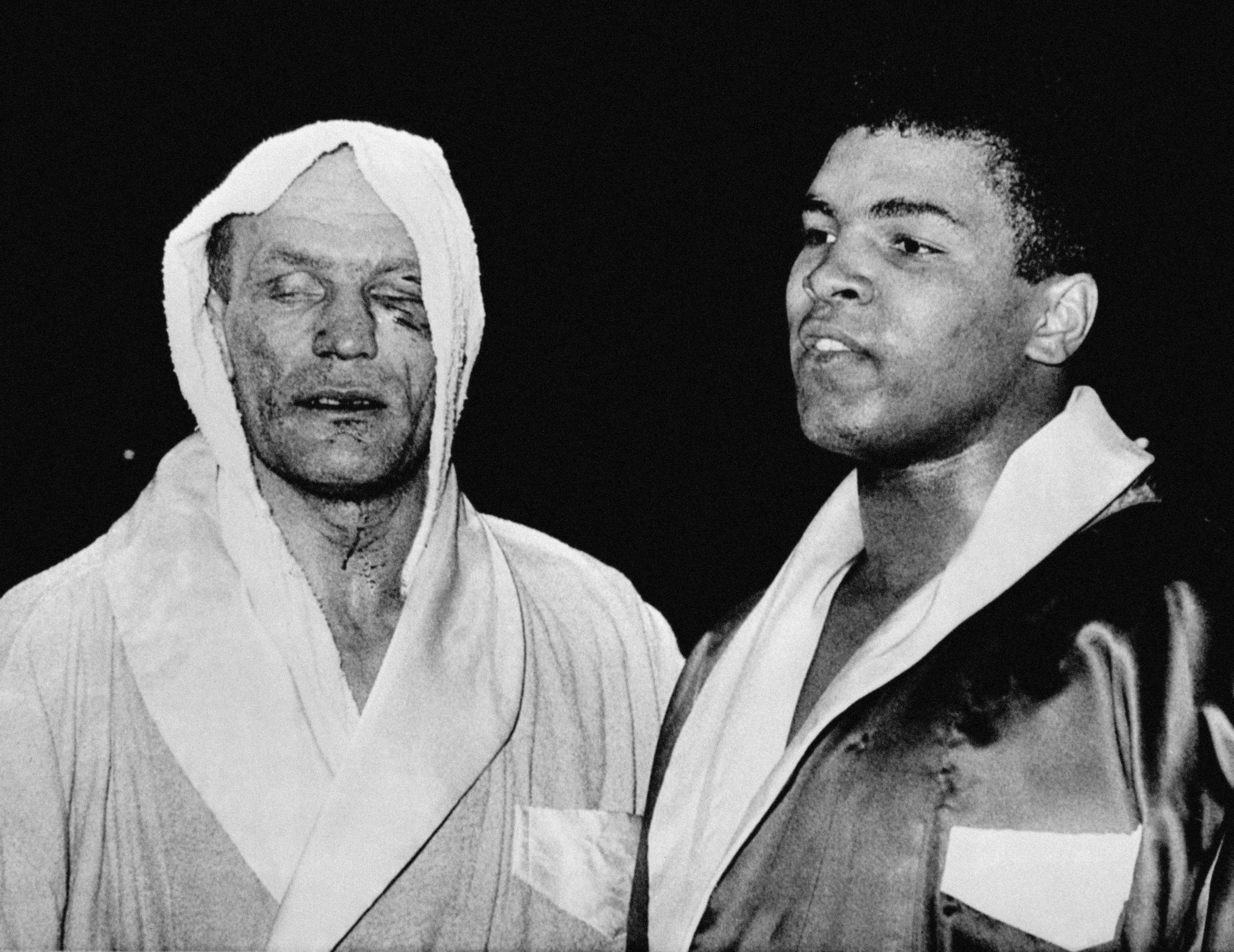
Muhammad Ali and Henry Cooper following their fight on 18 June 1963

In 1963 Muhammad Ali (then known as Cassius Clay and a contender for the world heavyweight title) created a great deal of ticket-selling publicity before his London bout with Cooper, who many British fans hoped would be able to humble the brash young American. In the boxing world, however, Ali was considered a future world champion and Cooper the underdog. The contest took place at Wembley Stadium, Wembley Park. According to the official weigh-in, Ali outweighed Cooper by 21 pounds, Cooper said he wore weighted clothing and was near the light heavyweight limit. Cooper had devised his own training regimen and felt that though lighter he was in the best condition of his career.

Ali's size, mobility, fast reflexes, and unorthodox defensive tactic of pulling back from punches made him a frustratingly elusive opponent, and Cooper was later accused by Ali's camp of hitting on the break. A stiff connection by Ali split open the face of Cooper in the middle of round three, beginning a gush of blood into his left eye. Ali, sensing the fight would be stopped because of the cut, began abandoning attempts of offense and instead began teasing and taunting Cooper, lowering his guard and leaving his jaw exposed to the Brit. Despite Ali's taunts and his bloody left eye, Cooper connected with a solitary left hook to the body; in the fourth's final seconds, Cooper felled Ali with an upward angled version of his trademark left hook to the jaw, "Enry's 'Ammer". Ali partly landed on the ropes, preventing his head hitting the canvas covered boards, but though up at the count of 3 he seemed hurt.

In the corner Dundee was angry and slapped Ali's legs. Ali misunderstood and tried to get off the stool. It has been claimed that Dundee may have used smelling salts to revive Ali. This has never been confirmed and the film is unclear if this happened. The use of smelling salts was prohibited in British boxing, and their use would have led to Ali losing by disqualification if the offence was proved. Dundee later said that he put his finger in a small tear in one of Ali's gloves to demonstrate to the referee and told the referee that his fighter needed replacements, but none were available. Cooper insisted that resulted in a delay of a minute or more in addition to the regulation time between rounds, and denied him a chance to finish off Ali while he was still dazed. A tape of the fight showed an interval extension of only an extra six seconds.

Cooper was the only person present who recalled a longer delay and because the surviving BBC tape of the bout is only of what was actually broadcast, it has been claimed a longer delay may have been edited out for transmission. Study of the tape shows no break and the commentary is also unbroken so the 6 second interval extension is correct. Ali started the 5th round aggressively, attempting to make good his prediction of a 5th-round knockout and opened a severe cut under Cooper's eye. Ali hit Cooper with a succession of hard rights knocking out his gumshield and Cooper's corner threw in the towel. Referee Tommy Little stopped the fight, and thus Ali defeated Cooper by technical knockout. Subsequently, a spare pair of gloves was always required at ringside. On the 40th anniversary of the fight, Ali telephoned Cooper to reminisce.

In 1966 Cooper fought Ali for the heavyweight championship, for a second time at Arsenal Stadium, Highbury. However, Ali was now alert to the danger posed by Cooper's left and more cautious than he had been in the previous contest; he held Cooper in a vice-like grip during clinches, and when told to break leapt backward several feet. Accumulated scar tissue around Cooper's eyes made him more vulnerable than in the previous meeting and a serious cut was opened by Ali, which led to the fight being stopped, Cooper again losing to Ali via technical knockout.

=== Later fights ===
After a fourth-round knockout loss to former world heavyweight champion Floyd Patterson in 1966, Cooper went undefeated until the final contest of his career. The successful defences of his British and Commonwealth titles against the likes of uniquely awkward Jack Bodell (TKO 2) and media-savvy Billy Walker (TKO 6) made Cooper the only man to win three Lonsdale Belts. With a win over Karl Mildenberger in 1968 Cooper added the European crown and made two successful defences. In 1970, Cooper would vacate his British Heavyweight Title after attempting to arrange a fight with World Boxing Association champion, Jimmy Ellis. However, the British Boxing Board of Control refused to sanction the match, citing they would only recognize a match between fellow champion Joe Frazier and a ranked opponent. Cooper and Bodell would rematch that year, with Bodell now defending his British Title after winning the vacated title from Carl Gizzi, and Cooper defending his Commonwealth title. Cooper would win the match over a 15-Round points decision, regaining his British title.

In May 1971 a 36-year-old Cooper faced 21-year-old Joe Bugner, one of the biggest heavyweights in the world, for the British, European and Commonwealth belts. Referee Harry Gibbs awarded the fight to Bugner by a quarter of a point score (which was subsequently abolished partly because of the controversy that followed). An audience mainly composed of Cooper fans did not appreciate the innately cautious Bugner, and the decision was booed with commentator Harry Carpenter asking, "And how, in the world, can you take away the man's three titles, like that?" Cooper announced his retirement shortly afterwards. Cooper refused to speak to Gibbs for many years but eventually agreed to shake his hand while they were at a charity event.

=== Opinion on modern boxers ===
In Cooper's later years, he retired from commentary on the sport as he became "disillusioned with boxing", wanting "straight, hard and fast boxing that he was used to from his times." While acknowledging that he was from a different era and would not be fighting as a heavyweight today, Cooper was nonetheless critical of the trend for heavyweights to bulk up as he thought it made for one-paced and less entertaining contests. In his final year, he said that he did not think boxing was "as good as it was", naming Joe Calzaghe, Ricky Hatton, and Amir Khan as "the best of their era", but asserting that "if you match them up with the champions of thirty or forty years ago I don't think they're as good".

== Life outside boxing ==
In the 1960s Cooper appeared in several public information films concerning road safety, promoting the use of zebra crossings: such as "The Story of Elsie Billing". After his retirement from boxing, he maintained a public profile with appearances in the BBC quiz show A Question of Sport and various advertisements, most famously in those for Brut aftershave. He was also a frequent guest speaker for charity fund-raising events. He appeared as boxer John Gully in the 1975 film Royal Flash and in his latter years featured in a series of UK public service announcements urging vulnerable groups to go to their doctors for vaccination against influenza called Get your Jab in First!

Cooper became a "Name" at Lloyd's of London, but in the 1990s he was reportedly one of those who suffered enormous personal losses because of the unlimited liability which a "Name" was then responsible for, being forced to sell his Lonsdale belts. Subsequently, Cooper's popularity as an after dinner speaker provided a source of income, and he was in most respects a picture of contentment although becoming more subdued in the years following his wife's sudden death aged 71.

Considering his long career, Cooper had suffered relatively little boxing-related damage to his health, and apart from "a bit of arthritis" remained an imposing figure: in the words of one journalist, "the living manifestation of an age of tuxedos in ringside seats, Harry Carpenter commentaries, sponge buckets and 'seconds out'". He lived in Hildenborough, Kent, where he was the president of Nizels Golf Club.

Cooper was married to Albina Genepri from 1960 until her death in 2008. He converted to her Catholic faith and described Albina, who "hated" his sport, as "an ideal wife for a boxer", never grumbling about his long absences before big fights and inviting journalists in for tea while they waited for Cooper to get out of bed the morning after bouts. Cooper died on 1 May 2011, two days before his 77th birthday. He was survived by their sons and two grandchildren.

Cooper was a lifelong Arsenal supporter.

== Awards and honours ==
Cooper was the first to win the BBC Sports Personality of the Year award twice, in 1967 for going unbeaten and in 1970, when Cooper had become the British, Commonwealth, and European heavyweight champion. He is the only British boxer to win three Lonsdale Belts outright.

Cooper was appointed an Officer of the Order of the British Empire (OBE) in the 1969 New Year Honours for services to boxing, awarded a Papal Knighthood in 1978, and was knighted in the 2000 New Year Honours, again for services to boxing. He is also celebrated as one of the great Londoners in the "London Song" by Ray Davies on his 1998 album The Storyteller. He was the subject of This Is Your Life in 1970 when he was surprised by Eamonn Andrews at Thames Television's Euston Road Studios.

== Professional boxing record ==
55 fights	40 wins	14 losses
By knockout	27	8
By decision	11	5
By disqualification	2	1
Draws	1	

No.	Result	Record	Opponent	Type	Round, time	Date	Location	Notes
55	Loss	40–14–1	Joe Bugner	PTS	15	16 Mar 1971	Empire Pool, London, England	Lost British, Commonwealth, and European heavyweight titles
54	Win	40–13–1	Jose Manuel Urtain	TKO	9 (15)	10 Nov 1970	Empire Pool, London, England	Won European heavyweight title
53	Win	39–13–1	Jack Bodell	PTS	15	24 Mar 1970	Empire Pool, London, England	Retained Commonwealth heavyweight title; Won British heavyweight title
52	Win	38–13–1	Piero Tomasoni	KO	5 (15)	13 Mar 1969	Palazzetto dello Sport, Rome, Italy	Retained European heavyweight title
51	Win	37–13–1	Karl Mildenberger	DQ	8 (15)	18 Sep 1968	Empire Pool, London, England	Won European heavyweight title; Mildenberger disqualified for an illegal headbutt
50	Win	36–13–1	Billy Walker	TKO	6 (15)	7 Nov 1967	Empire Pool, London, England	Retained British and Commonwealth heavyweight titles
49	Win	35–13–1	Jack Bodell	TKO	2 (15), 2:18	13 Jun 1967	Molineux Stadium, Wolverhampton, England	Retained British and Commonwealth heavyweight titles
48	Win	34–13–1	Boston Jacobs	PTS	10	17 Apr 1967	De Montfort Hall, Leicester, England	
47	Loss	33–13–1	Floyd Patterson	KO	4 (10), 2:10	20 Sep 1966	Empire Pool, London, England	
46	Loss	33–12–1	Muhammad Ali	TKO	6 (15), 1:38	21 May 1966	Arsenal Stadium, London, England	For WBC and The Ring heavyweight titles
45	Win	33–11–1	Jefferson Davis	KO	1 (10), 1:40	16 Feb 1966	Wolverhampton Civic Hall, Wolverhampton, England	
44	Win	32–11–1	Hubert Hilton	TKO	2 (10), 1:20	25 Jan 1966	London Olympia, London, England	
43	Loss	31–11–1	Amos Johnson	PTS	10	19 Oct 1965	Empire Pool, London, England	
42	Win	31–10–1	Johnny Prescott	RTD	10 (15), 3:00	15 Jun 1965	St Andrew's, Birmingham, England	Retained British and Commonwealth heavyweight titles
41	Win	30–10–1	Matthew Johnson	KO	1 (10), 2:34	20 Apr 1965	Wolverhampton Civic Hall, Wolverhampton, England	
40	Win	29–10–1	Dick Wipperman	TKO	5 (10), 1:30	12 Jan 1965	Royal Albert Hall, London, England	
39	Loss	28–10–1	Roger Rischer	PTS	10	16 Nov 1964	Royal Albert Hall, London, England	
38	Win	28–9–1	Brian London	PTS	15	24 Feb 1964	King's Hall, Manchester, England	Retained British and Commonwealth heavyweight titles; Won vacant European heavyweight title
37	Loss	27–9–1	Cassius Clay	TKO	5 (10), 2:15	18 Jun 1963	Wembley Stadium, London, England	
36	Win	27–8–1	Dick Richardson	KO	5 (15)	26 Mar 1963	Empire Pool, London, England	Retained British and Commonwealth heavyweight titles
35	Win	26–8–1	Joe Erskine	TKO	9 (15)	2 Apr 1962	Nottingham Ice Stadium, Nottingham, England	Retained British and Commonwealth heavyweight titles
34	Win	25–8–1	Wayne Bethea	PTS	10	26 Feb 1962	King's Hall, Manchester, England	
33	Win	24–8–1	Tony Hughes	RTD	5 (10), 3:00	23 Jan 1962	Empire Pool, London, England	
32	Loss	23–8–1	Zora Folley	KO	2 (10), 1:06	5 Dec 1961	Empire Pool, London, England	
31	Win	23–7–1	Joe Erskine	TKO	5 (15)	21 Mar 1961	Empire Pool, London, England	Retained British and Commonwealth heavyweight titles
30	Win	22–7–1	Alex Miteff	PTS	10	6 Dec 1960	Empire Pool, London, England	
29	Win	21–7–1	Roy Harris	PTS	10	13 Sep 1960	Empire Pool, London, England	
28	Win	20–7–1	Joe Erskine	TKO	12 (15)	17 Nov 1959	Earls Court Arena, London, England	Retained British and Commonwealth heavyweight titles
27	Win	19–7–1	Gawie de Klerk	TKO	5 (15)	26 Aug 1959	Coney Beach Pleasure Park, Bridgend, Wales	Retained Commonwealth heavyweight title
26	Win	18–7–1	Brian London	PTS	15	12 Jan 1959	Earls Court Arena, London, England	Won British and Commonwealth heavyweight titles
25	Win	17–7–1	Zora Folley	PTS	10	14 Oct 1958	Empire Pool, London, England	
24	Win	16–7–1	Dick Richardson	TKO	5 (10)	3 Sep 1958	Coney Beach Pleasure Park, Bridgend, Wales	
23	Loss	15–7–1	Erich Schoppner	DQ	6 (10)	19 Apr 1958	Festhalle Frankfurt, Frankfurt, Germany	Cooper disqualified for hitting Schoppner on the neck
22	Draw	15–6–1	Heinz Neuhaus	PTS	10	11 Jan 1958	Westfalenhallen, Dortmund, Germany	
21	Win	15–6	Hans Kalbfell	PTS	10	16 Nov 1957	Westfalenhallen, Dortmund, Germany	
20	Loss	14–6	Joe Erskine	PTS	15	17 Sep 1957	Harringay Arena, London, England	For British and Commonwealth heavyweight titles
19	Loss	14–5	Ingemar Johansson	KO	5 (15), 2:57	19 May 1957	Johanneshovs Isstadion, Stockholm, Sweden	For European heavyweight title
18	Loss	14–4	Joe Bygraves	KO	9 (15)	19 Feb 1957	Earls Court Arena, London, England	For Commonwealth heavyweight title
17	Loss	14–3	Peter Bates	TKO	5 (10)	7 Sep 1956	Belle Vue Zoological Gardens, Manchester, England	
16	Win	14–2	Giannino Orlando Luise	TKO	7 (10)	26 Jun 1956	Empire Pool, London, England	
15	Win	13–2	Brian London	TKO	1 (10), 2:35	1 May 1956	Empress Hall, Earl's Court, London, England	
14	Win	12–2	Maurice Mols	TKO	4 (10)	28 Feb 1956	Royal Albert Hall, London, England	
13	Loss	11–2	Joe Erskine	PTS	10	15 Nov 1955	Harringay Arena, London, England	
12	Win	11–1	Uber Bacilieri	KO	7 (10)	13 Sep 1955	White City Stadium, London, England	
11	Win	10–1	Ron Harman	TKO	7 (8)	6 Jun 1955	Nottingham Ice Stadium, Nottingham, England	
10	Loss	9–1	Uber Bacilieri	TKO	5 (8)	26 Apr 1955	Harringay Arena, London, England	
9	Win	9–0	Joe Bygraves	PTS	8	18 Apr 1955	Manor Place Baths, London, England	
8	Win	8–0	Joe Crickmar	TKO	5 (8)	29 Mar 1955	Earls Court Arena, London, England	
7	Win	7–0	Hugh Ferns	DQ	2 (6)	8 Mar 1955	Earls Court Arena, London, England	
6	Win	6–0	Cliff Purnell	PTS	6	8 Feb 1955	Harringay Arena, London, England	
5	Win	5–0	Colin Strauch	TKO	1 (6)	27 Jan 1955	Royal Albert Hall, London, England	
4	Win	4–0	Denny Ball	KO	3 (6)	7 Dec 1954	Harringay Arena, London, England	
3	Win	3–0	Eddie Keith	TKO	1 (6)	23 Nov 1954	Manor Place Baths, London, England	
2	Win	2–0	Dinny Powell	TKO	4 (6)	19 Oct 1954	Harringay Arena, London, England	
1	Win	1–0	Harry Painter	KO	1 (6)	14 Sep 1954	Harringay Arena, London, England	

Achievements
Preceded by Brian London	Commonwealth Heavyweight Champion; 12 January 1959 – 13 March 1971	Succeeded by Joe Bugner
Preceded by Brian London	British Heavyweight Champion; 10 January 1959 – 13 October 1969	Succeeded by Joe Bugner
Preceded by Ingemar Johansson	European Heavyweight Champion; 0 24 February 1964 – 17 October 1964	Succeeded by Joe Bugner
Awards
Preceded by Bobby Moore	BBC Sports Personality of the Year; 1967	Succeeded by David Hemery
Preceded by Ann Jones	BBC Sports Personality of the Year; 1970	Succeeded by The Princess Anne
