= Johnny Prescott =

English boxer

Personal information
- Nickname: Playboy
- Nationality: English
- Born: John M. Prescott; 20 August 1938 Nechells, Birmingham, Warwickshire, England, UK
- Died: 11 November 2012 (aged 74) Good Hope Hospital, Sutton Coldfield, Birmingham, England, UK
- Weight: cruiser/heavyweight

Boxing career
- Stance: Orthodox

Boxing record
- Total fights: 49
- Wins: 34 (KO 13)
- Losses: 11 (KO 6)
- Draws: 4

Johnny "Playboy" Prescott (20 August 1938 – 11 November 2012) born in Birmingham was an English professional cruiser/heavyweight boxer of the 1960s and 1970s, who won the British Boxing Board of Control (BBBofC) Midlands Area heavyweight title, and was a challenger for the BBBofC British heavyweight title, and British Commonwealth heavyweight title against Henry Cooper, the outdoor bout at Birmingham City's St Andrew's stadium was postponed for a day because of bad weather, his professional fighting weight varied from 13 st (83 kg; 182 lb), i.e. cruiserweight to 14 st (88.90410 kg; 196.00000 lb), i.e. heavyweight, he died in Good Hope Hospital, Sutton Coldfield. Johnny Prescott was an orphan, and was resident at Josiah Mason's Orphanage, Orphanage Road, Erdington, he later lived with his grandmother on William Henry Street, Nechells, he was a fan of Birmingham City, i.e. a Bluenose, as a boxer he was managed by George Biddles.
