= Wolverhampton Civic Hall =

Music venue in England

Coordinates: 52.5866°N 2.1307°W

University of Wolverhampton at The Halls
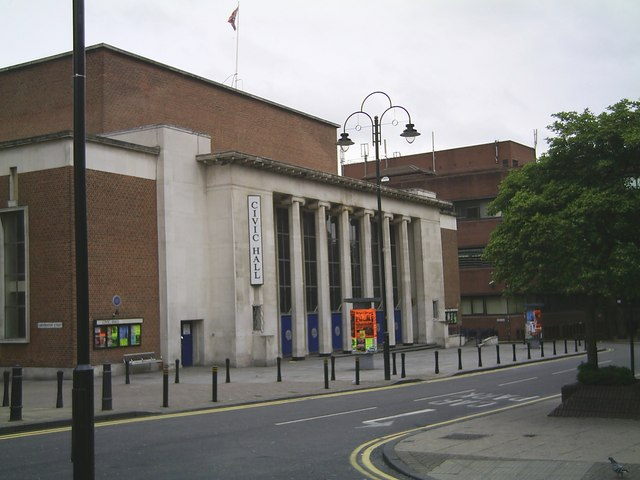
- Exterior of venue pre-renovation, 2006
- Interactive map of University of Wolverhampton at The Halls
- Location: Wolverhampton, England
- Owner: City of Wolverhampton Council
- Operator: AEG Presents
- Capacity: 3,400 (Civic Hall); 1,300 (Wulfrun Hall)

Construction
- Opened: 16 May 1938
- Expanded: 2001 and 2023

Website
- Venue Website

Listed Building – Grade II
- Designated: 31 March 1992
- Reference no.: 1207355

University of Wolverhampton at The Halls is a music and live events venue located in Wolverhampton, West Midlands, England. Formerly known as Wolverhampton Civic Hall, the venue has long been recognized as one of the most prominent live music destinations in the region.

Since March 2024, the University of Wolverhampton has held the naming rights to the venue, following a partnership with the institution.

The Halls comprises two distinct performance spaces: the larger Civic Hall, where events may be listed as University of Wolverhampton at The Civic Hall, and the smaller-capacity room the Wulfrun Hall, listed as University of Wolverhampton at The Wulfrun Hall.

The venue is owned by City of Wolverhampton Council, operated by AEG Presents and is a Grade II listed building.

== Construction and development ==
The hall, which was designed by Lyons and Israel in the Classical style was completed in May 1938. The smaller Wulfrun Hall had been inspired by the architecture of the Stockholm Concert Hall. It was officially opened by the Earl of Dartmouth on 12 May 1938. Jack Hylton and his orchestra provided the entertainment for the occasion. Queen Elizabeth II visited the Civic Hall and had lunch with civic leaders during a visit to the West Midlands on 24 May 1962.

It was renovated and extended to a design by Penoyre & Prasad in 2001.

The venue was reconfigured to create the new Slade Rooms in March 2010.

City of Wolverhampton Council announced plans for a revamp of the Civic Halls with a budget of £10.4 million in March 2015. The halls closed in December 2015 at which time the cost projection had increased to £14.4 million. In March 2019 it was announced that the halls would not reopen until autumn 2021 and that the cost was projected at £38.1 million.

In November 2021 it was announced that the Civic Halls were now due to reopen in Autumn 2022, which in October 2022 was officially revised to June 2023. The City Council also announced that they had signed a 25-year deal with AEG Presents to manage and promote the venues, which have been expanded to 3,404 in the Civic Hall and 1,289 in the Wulfrun Hall.

The reopening of the place took place in May 2023, with a series of concerts including Blur as the official reopening night and headline shows from the Script, McFly, Sugar Babes, and Siouxsie Sioux.

== Organ ==
A Compton Organ was specially designed for the Civic Hall. The organ was made up of over 5,500 pipes and contained an early electronic division known as a Melotone. G. D. Cunningham, then Birmingham City Organist, had the distinction of being the first musician to play there to invited guests. The Organ was re-built and enlarged in 2001, and was capable of being played as a concert organ or theatre organ.

In September 2016 it was announced that the organ would be removed and would not return to the Civic Hall. In February 2019 it was revealed that the pipes had been scrapped, despite several offers to restore them, free of charge.

== Events ==
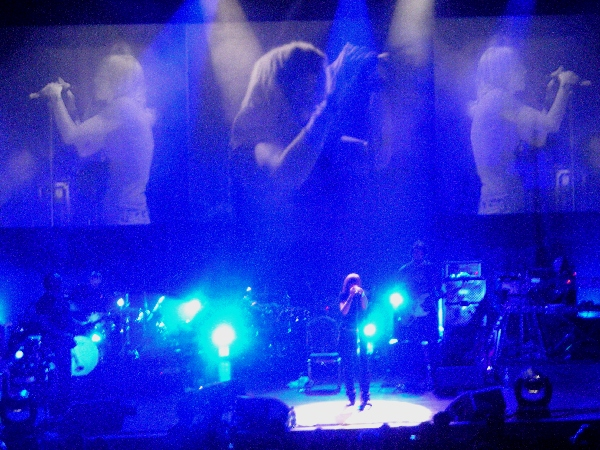
Portishead playing live at the venue, 13 April 2008

The first concert was performed on the evening of 16 May 1938, by the Old Royals Association, with Anne Ziegler, Webster Booth and several other soloists.

Comedians, such as Ken Dodd, Peter Kay and Jim Davidson, have appeared at the hall.

It has also staged some sports events. Throughout much of the 1970s and 1980s professional wrestling was broadcast live from the venue on Saturday afternoons. On 16 March 2006 the venue was first utilized by the Professional Darts Corporation as it hosted Week 4 of the 2006 Premier League Darts. From 2007 the venue has staged the Grand Slam of Darts. However the tournament in 2018 was moved to Aldersley Leisure Village due to on going refurbishments at the Civic Hall. Gary Anderson, having competed every year in tournament since its conception, says he prefers the Civic Hall over the new venue. "The Civic Hall - that was the Grand Slam of Darts."

There have also been some memorable concerts. The rock band the Who performed there in January 1969. Morrissey played his first solo performance at the Civic Hall on 22 December 1988. Nirvana performed "All Apologies" for the first time before a live audience at the Wulfrun Hall on 6 November 1991 and Louise Redknapp performed there on the final date of her Soft and Gentle Tour on 18 December 1997.

In 2009, the Specials played a concert at the Civic Hall as part of their 30th anniversary reunion tour; the performance was later released on DVD. The Welsh rock band Manic Street Preachers gave a concert in June 2015. It was announced in February 2023 that Siouxsie would play her first UK gig after a ten-year absence at the Civic Hall in June 2023.
