= Tex Maule =

American football writer (1915–1981)

Hamilton Prieleaux Bee Maule, commonly known as Tex Maule (May 19, 1915 – May 16, 1981) was the lead American football writer for Sports Illustrated in the 1950s, 1960s, and 1970s.

== Early life ==
Born in Florida and raised in San Antonio, Texas, Maule played football as an end at St. Mary's in college. He also served in World War II. After the war, he graduated from the University of Texas with a degree in journalism.

== Career ==
Maule joined the NFL's Los Angeles Rams front office as a publicity director, where he worked with Pro Football Hall of Famers Pete Rozelle and Tex Schramm. He worked with the Rams from 1949 to 1951. Later, in 1956, Maule was hired by Sports Illustrated, where he covered football for 19 years.

Maule referred to the 1958 NFL Championship Game between the Giants and the Colts as "the best game ever", according to writer Mark Bowden. Bowden wrote a 50th-anniversary book about the game using Maule's description as his title.

When the upstart American Football League (AFL) began play in 1960, Maule did not conceal his loyalty to, nor his preference for, Rozelle and the NFL. For years he ridiculed and made light of the rival AFL. For example, in a September 30, 1968 SI piece entitled The Young Generals, supposedly about Pro Football's best young quarterbacks, he praised such statistically average NFL signal-callers as Gary Cuozzo, Randy Johnson and Kent Nix, and never even mentioned future Hall of Fame AFL quarterbacks Bob Griese, Lenny Dawson, or Joe Namath. His strong bias against and contempt for the AFL was mimicked by other writers who wrote derivatory columns.

Maule gained such notoriety for his bias that it was well known to his media contemporaries. During the broadcast of the AFL's New York Jets' defeat of the NFL champion Baltimore Colts in Super Bowl III, announcer Curt Gowdy asked (off-air): "I wonder if that [S.O.B.] Tex Maule is watching?" The comment can be heard on existing videos of the NBC-TV network feed of the game.

Maule also was a prolific author during the late 1950s and early 1960s. One book he wrote was The Rookie (1961, David McKay Company, NY) which is about professional football.

Maule covered Muhammad Ali's 1967 heavyweight title bout against Ernie Terrell for Sports Illustrated, writing of Ali's performance: "It was a wonderful demonstration of boxing skill and a barbarous display of cruelty." The line was widely quoted by subsequent writers, including Ali's biographer Thomas Hauser.

From Sports Illustrated, Maule moved to The Dallas Morning News for three years. From Dallas, he returned to New York to write on a freelance basis. It was there he died in 1981.

In 1972, he wrote a book, Running Scarred [Pelham Books 1972], about his experience having a heart attack and taking up running afterwards.

== Bibliography ==
Note: books may be published under the name Hamilton Maule or Tex Maule

- The Rookie (1961)
- The Quarterback (1962)
- The Shortstop (1962)
- Beatty of the Yankees (1963)
- The Last Out (1964)
- Championship Quarterback (1963)
- The Linebacker (1965)
- The Running Back (1966)
- The Corner Back (1967)
- The Players (1967)
- The Receiver (1968)
- The Pro Season (1970)
- The Running Back (1971)
- Running Scarred (1972)
- Footsteps: His Drive and Ambition Made Him One of the Best—and Most Hated—Coaches in America (1973)
- Bart Starr (1973)
