= Dick Richardson (boxer) =

Welsh boxer (1934–1999)

Personal information
- Nationality: (Wales) Welsh
- Born: Richard Alexander Richardson; 1 June 1934 Newport, Monmouthshire, Wales
- Died: 15 July 1999 (aged 65)
- Height: 6 ft 3 in (191 cm)
- Weight: Heavyweight

Boxing career
- Stance: Orthodox

Boxing record
- Total fights: 47
- Wins: 31
- Win by KO: 24
- Losses: 14
- Draws: 2

Richard Alexander Richardson (1 June 1934 – 15 July 1999) was a professional boxer from the Maesglas area of Newport, Monmouthshire, Wales. He held the European heavyweight title from March 1960 to June 1962. In all, he won 31 of his 47 professional bouts, losing 14, with two drawn. He was one of a quartet of British heavyweights in the 1950s and early 1960s, along with Henry Cooper, Joe Erskine and Brian London, who held out the possibility of a challenging for a heavyweight world title.

Richardson defeated a number of top heavyweights in his career, including; Karl Mildenberger, Bob Baker, Brian London and Hans Kalbfell.

== Career ==
He was born Richard Alexander Richardson but was known as Dick. He was 6 feet 3 inches (191 cm) tall and weighed about 14 stone 4 pounds (200 lb; 91 kg). He had a few amateur bouts before being called up for his national service in 1953. He served in the Royal Army Service Corps where he became boxing champion. However he was beaten in the inter-services boxing championships by Brian London, later to become British heavyweight boxing champion, and fighting under his real name of Harper. He turned professional in 1954, being managed by Wally Lesley and trained by Johnny Lewis at a gym in Blackfriars, London. In September 1954, he lost his first professional bout on points against Henry Cooper's twin brother, George, fighting under the ring name of Jim Cooper. He avenged this defeat in March 1955 with a technical knockout in the second round.

=== Rising up ===
Richardson began to build up an impressive list of victories, many of them inside the distance. In May 1956 he fought fellow Welsh heavyweight, Joe Erskine, in the Maindy Stadium, Cardiff, in front of 35,000 fans. Despite knocking Erskine down in round five, Richardson lost on points. Richardson continued to look for higher-class opponents and in October 1956, he fought the ex-world champion Ezzard Charles in a fight that became a farce when the American was disqualified in round two for persistent holding. He next fought the world-class Cuban, Nino Valdes in December 1956, but was forced to retire in the eighth round.

Richardson's first title fight was for the Commonwealth (British Empire) Heavyweight Title against the holder, the Jamaican, Joe Bygraves, in Cardiff in May 1957. The fight, over fifteen rounds was a draw and Bygraves retained his title.

In October 1957, Richardson, was easily out-pointed in a bout against the future world light-heavyweight champion, Willie Pastrano. His career appeared to be faltering when he was beaten by Henry Cooper in September 1958, on a technical knockout in the fifth round, and also lost to Joe Erskine on points in June 1959.

=== European title ===
However, in March 1960, he was matched against the German boxer Hans Kalbfell, for the vacant European heavyweight title. He had previously beaten Kalbfell in four rounds, in Porthcawl, and he won this bout, held in Dortmund, Germany, by a technical knockout in the thirteenth round. The defeat of Kalbfell provoked a riot amongst the German fans, and Richardson needed a police escort to reach his dressing room.

Richardson defended his European title in August 1960, against Brian London, in Porthcawl, winning by a technical knockout in the eighth round. This result provoked a brawl, when London's father and brother, with Richardson's brothers coming in to defend as the Londons invaded the ring to protest that Richardson had used his head to open a cut on his opponent.

Richardson also won a return bout against Hans Kalbfell in Dortmund in February 1961, gaining a points decision.

Richardson won the next defence of his title, in February 1962, against the German, Karl Mildenberger, by an astonishing first-round knockout. The bout was held in Dortmund. Mildenberger would fight Muhammad Ali for the world title several years later.

Richardson's fourth defence of his title was in June 1962, against the hard-punching Swede, Ingemar Johansson. Johansson had been world heavyweight champion after beating Floyd Patterson, but had subsequently lost the title to Patterson in June 1960. The bout was held in Gothenburg, Sweden in front of 50,000 spectators, and Richardson was knocked out in the eighth round.

Richardson's last fight was in March 1963, when Henry Cooper defended his British and Commonwealth heavyweight titles against him at Wembley. Richardson was knocked out in the fifth round.

== Retirement and death ==
Richardson retired at the relatively early age of 28, and ran a small chain of butcher's shops in Surrey. Dick Richardson, offered advice to Newport Heavyweight David Pearce. Dick believed if David had signed with a promoter from London he would have become a World Champion. David would not leave his father due to his loyalty He died from cancer on 15 July 1999, aged 65. He was married to Betty Richardson with one son, Gary and one daughter Lyn, from whom he has six grandchildren.

In his 47 professional bouts, he won 31 (24 on knock-outs), and lost 14 (4 on knock-outs). Two of his bouts were drawn.

== Professional boxing record ==
31 Wins (24 knockouts, 6 decisions, 1 DQ), 14 Losses (4 knockouts, 7 decisions, 3 DQs), 2 Draws Archived 2012-10-03 at the Wayback Machine
Result	Record	Opponent	Type	Round	Date	Location	Notes
Loss	26-8-1	(United Kingdom) Henry Cooper	KO	5	26 March 1963	(United Kingdom) Empire Pool, Wembley, London	BBBofC/Commonwealth Heavyweight Titles.
Loss	24-2	(Sweden) Ingemar Johansson	KO	8	17 June 1962	(Sweden) Nya Ullevi, Gothenburg	EBU Heavyweight Title.
Win	30-1	(Germany) Karl Mildenberger	KO	1	24 February 1962	(Germany) Westfalenhallen, Dortmund	EBU Heavyweight Title. Mildenberger knocked out at 2:35 of the first round.
Loss	37-22-8	(United States) Howard King	PTS	10	5 September 1961	(United Kingdom) Empire Pool, Wembley, London	
Win	26-6-1	(Germany) Hans Kalbfell	PTS	15	18 February 1961	(Germany) Westfalenhallen, Dortmund	EBU Heavyweight Title.
Win	23-6	(United Kingdom) Brian London	TKO	8	29 August 1960	(Wales) Coney Beach Pleasure Park, Porthcawl	EBU Heavyweight Title.
Loss	39-7-1	(United States) Mike DeJohn	DQ	8	27 July 1960	(Wales) Coney Beach Pleasure Park, Porthcawl	
Win	25-5-1	(Germany) Hans Kalbfell	TKO	13	27 March 1960	(Germany) Westfalenhallen, Dortmund	EBU Heavyweight Title.
Loss	38-7-1	(United States) Mike DeJohn	PTS	10	1 December 1959	(United Kingdom) Empire Pool, Wembley, London	
Loss	34-3-1	(Wales) Joe Erskine	PTS	10	24 June 1959	(Wales) Coney Beach Pleasure Park, Porthcawl	
Win	25-16-4	(United States) Bert Whitehurst	PTS	10	10 March 1959	(United Kingdom) Empire Pool, Wembley, London	
Win	13-5	(United States) Garvin Sawyer	PTS	10	28 October 1958	(United Kingdom) Harringay Arena, Harringay, London	
Loss	15-7-1	(United Kingdom) Henry Cooper	TKO	5	3 September 1958	(Wales) Coney Beach Pleasure Park, Porthcawl	
Win	50-12-1	(United States) Bob Baker	PTS	10	9 July 1958	(Wales) Coney Beach Pleasure Park, Porthcawl	
Win	29-18-6	(Germany) Hans Friedrich	KO	4	17 May 1958	(Wales) Newtown Pavilion, Newtown, Powys	
Loss	39-2	(United States) Cleveland Williams	DQ	4	25 March 1958	(United Kingdom) Empress Hall, Earl's Court, Kensington, London	
Win	13-18-4	(France) Maurice Mols	TKO	6	3 March 1958	(Wales) Carmarthen Market hall, Carmarthen	
Loss	49-11-1	(United States) Bob Baker	PTS	10	10 December 1957	(United Kingdom) Harringay Arena, Harringay, London	
Loss	41-5-5	(United States) Willie Pastrano	PTS	10	22 October 1957	(United Kingdom) Harringay Arena, Harringay, London	
Win	17-2	(Germany) Hans Kalbfell	TKO	4	31 July 1957	(Wales) Coney Beach Pleasure Park, Porthcawl	
Draw	35-9	(Jamaica) Joe Bygraves	PTS	15	27 May 1957	(Wales) Maindy Stadium, Cardiff	Commonwealth Heavyweight Title.
Win	17-5-1	(Italy) Giannino Luise	TKO	5	1 April 1957	(United Kingdom) Nottingham Ice Stadium, Nottingham, Nottinghamshire	
Loss	35-14-3	(Cuba) Nino Valdes	TKO	8	4 December 1956	(United Kingdom) Harringay Arena, Harringay, London	
Win	91-20-1	(United States) Ezzard Charles	DQ	2	2 October 1956	(United Kingdom) Harringay Arena, Harringay, London	
Win	24-14-1	(Austria) Kurt Schiegl	TKO	1	16 July 1956	(Wales) Maindy Stadium, Cardiff	
Win	17-15-8	(Germany) Guenter Nurnberg	TKO	3	7 July 1956	(Wales) Park Avenue Field, Aberystwyth	
Loss	27-0-1	(Wales) Joe Erskine	PTS	10	7 May 1956	(Wales) Maindy Stadium, Cardiff	
Win	33-8-1	(Belgium) Marcel Limage	RTD	5	27 February 1956	(Wales) Cardiff	
Win	33-10-5	(Luxembourg) Werner Wiegand	TKO	6	17 January 1956	(United Kingdom) Streatham Ice Arena, Streatham, London, England	
Win	14-2-1	(Belgium) Alain Cherville	KO	2	6 December 1955	(United Kingdom) Harringay Arena, Harringay, London	
Win	12-28-5	(Germany) Robert Warmbrunn	TKO	1	7 November 1955	(Wales) Abergavenny Market hall, Abergavenny	
Win	10-30-4	(Belgium) Robert Eugene	KO	4	18 October 1955	(United Kingdom) Harringay Arena, Harringay, London	
Win	0-16-2	(Belgium) Emile DeGreef	KO	2	26 September 1955	(Wales) Carmarthen Drill hall, Carmarthen	
Win	18-4-1	(United Kingdom) Peter Bates	TKO	3	13 September 1955	(United Kingdom) White City Stadium, White City, London	
Win	11-15-4	(Luxembourg) Jean Serres	TKO	3	29 August 1955	(Wales) Maindy Stadium, Cardiff	
Win	0-14	(Belgium) Prosper Beck	PTS	8	18 July 1955	(Wales) Maindy Stadium, Cardiff	
Loss	12-8-1	(Scotland) Hugh Ferns	DQ	5	13 June 1955	(Wales) Maindy Stadium, Cardiff	
Win	12-11	(United Kingdom) Morrie Bush	KO	2	26 April 1955	(United Kingdom) Harringay Arena, Harringay, London	
Win	6-5	(United Kingdom) Denny Ball	TKO	3	18 April 1955	(Wales) Maindy Stadium, Cardiff	
Win	2-1	(United Kingdom) Jim Cooper	TKO	2	15 March 1955	(United Kingdom) Streatham Ice Arena, Streatham, London, England	
Win	10-7	(United Kingdom) Sid Cain	TKO	3	28 February 1955	(Wales) Sophia Gardens, Cardiff	
Win	12-9-2	(United Kingdom) Johnny McLeavy	TKO	4	24 January 1955	(United Kingdom) Manor Place Baths, Walworth, London	
Win	6-4-1	(United Kingdom) Sammy Clarke	KO	1	10 January 1955	(Wales) Maindy Stadium, Cardiff	
Win	3-4-2	(United Kingdom) Johnny Hall	PTS	6	29 November 1954	(Wales) Sophia Gardens, Cardiff	
Draw	--	(United Kingdom) Bernie Jelley	PTS	6	12 October 1954	(United Kingdom) Royal Albert Hall, Kensington, London	
Win	--	Peter Green	KO	1	4 October 1954	(Wales) Maindy Stadium, Cardiff	
Loss	--	(United Kingdom) Jim Cooper	PTS	6	14 September 1954	(United Kingdom) Harringay Arena, Harringay, London	

== Sources & external links ==
- Obituary:
- Obit from the Guardian
- Dick Richardson at BoxRec (registration required)
