= Eddie Machen =

American boxer (1932–1972)

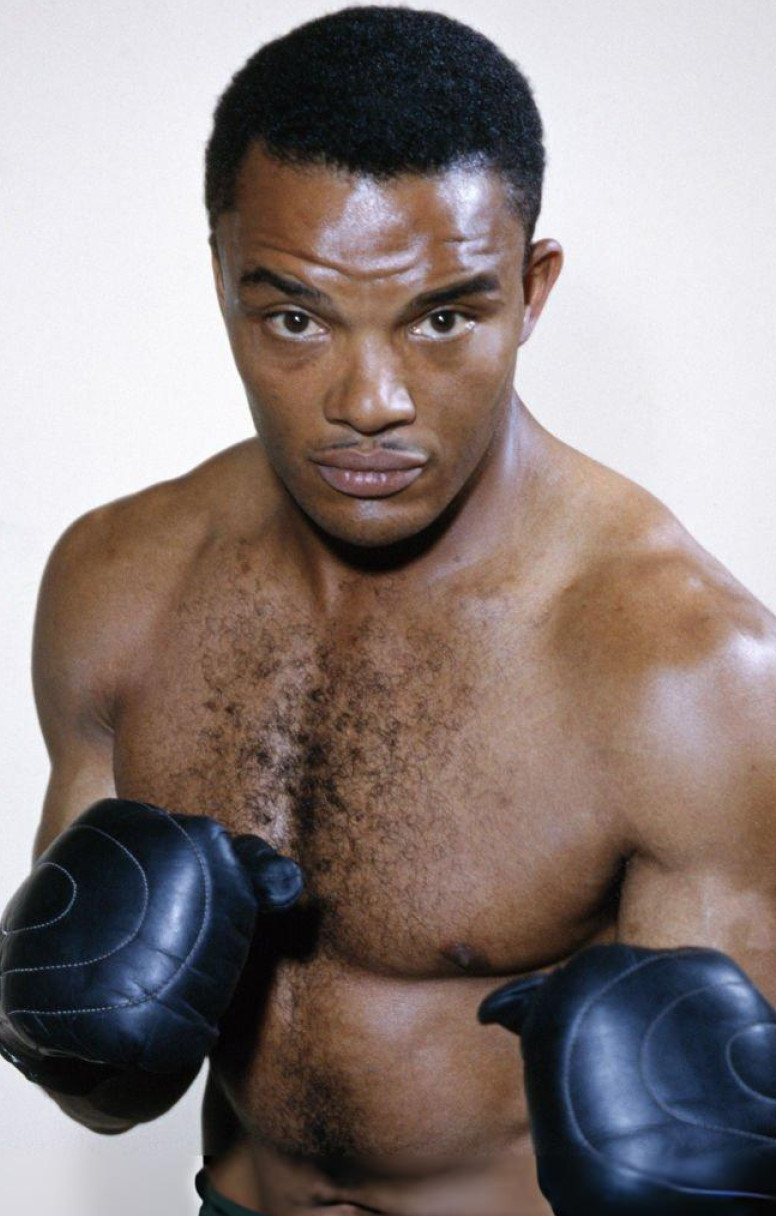
- Machen c. 1962

Personal information
- Nationality: American
- Born: Edward Mills Machen; June 15, 1932 Redding, California, U.S.
- Died: August 8, 1972 (aged 40) San Francisco, California, U.S.
- Height: 6 ft 0 in (1.83 m)
- Weight: Heavyweight

Boxing career
- Reach: 75 in (191 cm)
- Stance: Orthodox

Boxing record
- Total fights: 64
- Wins: 50
- Win by KO: 29
- Losses: 11
- Draws: 3

Edward Mills Machen (June 15, 1932 – August 8, 1972) was an American professional boxer. He was one of six children of a rural mail carrier. Machen dropped out of high school and became an amateur boxer. However, after just three bouts he was arrested and convicted of armed robbery. After his release, he became a professional boxer, determined never to return to prison again. His 64-bout career began on March 22, 1955, and he went on to win his first 24 bouts. He was highly rated and fought most of the big names of his era and he defeated many of the important names of his period such as Bob Baker, Jerry Quarry, Niño Valdés, Joey Maxim, Willi Besmanoff, Tommy Jackson, Brian London, Howard King and Doug Jones (boxer)

== Professional career ==
=== Early career ===
Machen often fought at Civic Auditorium or the Cow Palace in San Francisco. His first bout was with fellow first-timer Raul Flores, whom he knocked out in the first round. He had eleven fights in 1955 and the six-foot, 195-pounder won them all, ten by knockout or technical knockout. He had eight more wins in 1956 against better competition. In 1957, he won all five fights he had, including two over former light heavyweight champion Joey Maxim. The Maxim wins made him a ranked contender.

In April 1958, he met highly ranked Zora Folley and fought to a draw over 12 rounds. But he was then knocked out in one round by undefeated future heavyweight champion Ingemar Johansson, in September. After being caught flush by a big right hand Machen was floored three times, the last for some minutes.

On the comeback trail in 1959, Machen posted seven straight wins to return him to contention. In January 1960, he lost a decision to Folley at the Cow Palace. Later that year he met top contender and future champion, Sonny Liston, and although he lost by a clear 12-round unanimous decision, fought a sharp hit and move match that many believed was later studied by heavyweight champion Muhammad Ali. Liston was penalized three times for low blows in that match.

1961 began with two wins, then a very controversial loss to Harold Johnson by decision. Again, he came back with three very good wins, including a decision over undefeated Doug Jones. In 1962, Machen had two more wins before he had a draw with high-ranked big hitter Cleveland Williams in Houston in July 1962. In 1963 he resumed fighting and scored four straight knockouts to finish the year. He fought just twice in 1964, battling his personal issues. One was a win, the other a close 12-round loss to another former heavyweight champion, Floyd Patterson in Sweden in July 1964.

=== Title shot and late career ===
In 1965, Machen received his first world title shot when he and 6' 6" Ernie Terrell met for the vacated World Boxing Association title that had been stripped from Muhammad Ali. Terrell won the 15-round decision. In 1966 he lost a decision to German southpaw Karl Mildenberger in Germany, then lost a close split-decision to powerful slugger Manuel Ramos. But he closed that year with two wins, one particularly notable over future contender Jerry Quarry, which was Quarry's first defeat

=== Versus Joe Frazier ===
In late 1966, Machen fought young future heavyweight champion Joe Frazier and lost in a tenth-round technical knockout. Downed in the first round, Machen continued to try to out-slug rather than out-box the relentless Frazier.

=== Retirement ===
Machen retired in 1967 at age 35 following consecutive losses to Henry Clark, Boone Kirkman and Joe Frazier.

== Health and death ==
Machen was admitted to the Napa State Hospital in the fall of 1962 after threatening to commit suicide. Biographies state he suffered from clinical depression. He later filed for bankruptcy in 1966 and retired from boxing in 1967. His final record was 50–11–3, with 27 KOs.

Eddie Machen was found dead in San Francisco on August 8, 1972, apparently the result of a fall from a second story apartment window. He was 40 years old. It is not known if the cause of death was suicide, accident, or murder.

== Professional boxing record ==
50 Wins (29 knockouts, 21 decisions), 11 Losses (3 knockouts, 8 decisions), 3 Draws
Result	Record	Opponent	Type	Round	Date	Location	Notes
Loss	50–11–3	(United States) Boone Kirkman	TKO	3	26/05/1967	(United States) Seattle Center Coliseum, Seattle, Washington	Referee stopped the bout at 1:09 of the third round.
Loss	50–10–3	(United States) Henry Clark	PTS	12	28/03/1967	(United States) Sacramento Memorial Auditorium, Sacramento, California	California Heavyweight Title.
Loss	50–9–3	(United States) Joe Frazier	TKO	10	21/11/1966	(United States) Olympic Auditorium, Los Angeles, California	Referee stopped the bout at 0:22 of the tenth round.
Win	50–8–3	(United States) George "Scrap Iron" Johnson	UD	10	29/09/1966	(United States) Olympic Auditorium, Los Angeles, California	
Win	49–8–3	(United States) Jerry Quarry	UD	10	14/07/1966	(United States) Olympic Auditorium, Los Angeles, California	
Win	48–8–3	(United States) Joey Orbillo	SD	10	23/06/1966	(United States) Olympic Auditorium, Los Angeles, California	
Loss	47–8–3	(Mexico) Manuel "Pulgarcito" Ramos	SD	10	03/06/1966	(United States) Los Angeles Sports Arena, Los Angeles, California	
Loss	47—7—3	(Germany) Karl Mildenberger	PTS	10	03/02/1966	(Germany) Festhalle Frankfurt, Frankfurt, Hesse	
Draw	47-6-3	(United States) Elmer Rush	PTS	10	10/05/1965	(United States) San Francisco Civic Auditorium, San Francisco, California	
Loss	47–6–2	(United States) Ernie Terrell	UD	15	05/03/1965	(United States) International Amphitheatre, Chicago, Illinois	WBA Heavyweight Title
Loss	47–5–2	(United States) Floyd Patterson	PTS	12	05/07/1964	(Sweden) Rasunda, Solna Municipality	
Win	47–4–2	(United States) Duke Sabedong	KO	1	17/02/1964	(United States) Kezar Pavilion, San Francisco, California	Sabedong knocked out at 2:56 of the first round.
Win	46–4–2	(United States) Dave E. Bailey	KO	8	30/11/1963	(United States) Reno, Nevada	
Win	45–4–2	(United States) Bill McMurray	KO	7	05/11/1963	(United States) Sacramento Memorial Auditorium, Sacramento, California	McMurray knocked out at 2:13 of the seventh round.
Win	44–4–2	(United States) Alonzo Johnson	KO	9	12/10/1963	(United States) Santa Monica Civic Auditorium, Santa Monica, California	Johnson knocked out at 1:12 of the ninth round.
Win	43–4–2	(United States) Ollie Wilson	KO	6	16/09/1963	(United States) Santa Monica Civic Auditorium, Santa Monica, California	
Draw	42-4-2	(United States) Cleveland Williams	PTS	10	10/07/1962	(United States) Sam Houston Coliseum, Houston, Texas	
Win	42–4–1	(United States) Roger Rischer	UD	10	28/05/1962	(United States) San Francisco Civic Auditorium, San Francisco, California	
Win	41–4—1	(United States) Bert Whitehurst	TKO	6	23/04/1962	(United States) Los Angeles Sports Arena, Los Angeles, California	
Win	40–4–1	(United States) Doug Jones	UD	10	02/12/1961	(United States) Miami Beach Convention Center, Miami Beach, Florida	
Win	39–4–1	(United Kingdom) Brian London	RTD	5	17/10/1961	(United Kingdom) Empire Pool, Wembley, London	
Win	38–4–1	(United States) Mike DeJohn	TKO	9	16/09/1961	(United States) Syracuse War Memorial Arena, Syracuse, New York	Referee stopped the bout at 1:09 of the ninth round.
Loss	37–4–1	(United States) Harold Johnson	PTS	10	01/07/1961	(United States) Boardwalk Hall, Atlantic City, New Jersey	
Win	37–3–1	(United States) Mike DeJohn	UD	10	10/04/1961	(United States) Cow Palace, Daly City, California	
Win	36–3–1	(United States) Garvin Sawyer	KO	5	22/02/1961	(United States) Stockton, California	
Win	35–3–1	(United States) Wayne Bethea	UD	10	19/12/1960	(United States) Auditorium, Portland, Oregon	
Loss	34-3–1	(United States) Sonny Liston	UD	12	07/09/1960	(United States) Sick's Stadium, Seattle, Washington	
Win	34–2–1	(United States) Alonzo Johnson	UD	10	08/06/1960	(United States) Chicago Stadium, Chicago, Illinois	
Win	33–2–1	(Argentina) Alex Miteff	UD	10	20/05/1960	(United States) Madison Square Garden, New York City	
Win	32–2–1	(United States) Billy H. Hunter	TKO	9	26/02/1960	(United States) Madison Square Garden, New York City	Referee stopped the bout at 2:11 of the ninth round.
Loss	31–2–1	(United States) Zora Folley	UD	12	18/01/1960	(United States) Cow Palace, Daly City, California	
Win	31–1–1	(United States) Pat McMurtry	KO	1	27/10/1959	(United States) Pacific Livestock Pavilion, Portland, Oregon	Pacific Northwest Heavyweight Title. McMurtry knocked out at 2:11 of the first round.
Win	30–1–1	(Germany) Willi Besmanoff	UD	10	16/09/1959	(United States) Auditorium, Portland, Oregon	
Win	29–1–1	(United States) Garvin Sawyer	PTS	10	11/08/1959	(United States) Memorial Auditorium, Fresno, California	
Win	28–1–1	(United States) Reuben Vargas	TKO	6	22/07/1959	(United States) Portland Metropolitan Exposition Center, Portland, Oregon	
Win	27–1–1	(United States) Reuben Vargas	UD	10	20/05/1959	(United States) Cow Palace, Daly City, California	
Win	26–1–1	(United States) Clarence Williams	TKO	9	31/03/1959	(United States) Sacramento Memorial Auditorium, Sacramento, California	Referee stopped the bout at 1:42 of the ninth round.
Win	25–1–1	(United States) Young Jack Johnson	UD	10	05/03/1959	(United States) Auditorium, Portland, Oregon	
Loss	24–1–1	(Sweden) Ingemar Johansson	KO	1	14/09/1958	(Sweden) Nya Ullevi, Gothenburg	Machen knocked out at 2:16 of the first round.
Draw	24–0–1	(United States) Zora Folley	PTS	12	09/04/1958	(United States) Cow Palace, Daly City, California	
Win	24–0	(United States) Tommy Hurricane Jackson	RTD	10	13/11/1957	(United States) Cow Palace, Daly City, California	
Win	23–0	(Argentina) Edgardo Romero	KO	5	18/09/1957	(United States) Auditorium, Portland, Oregon	
Win	22–0	(United States) Bob Baker	UD	10	24/07/1957	(United States) Chicago Stadium, Chicago, Illinois	
Win	21–0	(United States) Joey Maxim	UD	10	03/05/1957	(United States) Kentucky Exposition Center, Louisville, Kentucky	
Win	20–0	(United States) Joey Maxim	UD	10	25/01/1957	(United States) Miami Beach Auditorium, Miami Beach, Florida	
Win	19–0	(United States) Johnny Summerlin	UD	10	05/12/1956	(United States) Syracuse War Memorial Arena, Syracuse, New York	
Win	18–0	(United States) John Holman	KO	7	24/10/1956	(United States) Portland Armory, Portland, Oregon	
Win	17–0	(Cuba) Julio Mederos	UD	10	04/09/1956	(United States) Auditorium, Portland, Oregon	
Win	16–0	(United States) Walter Hafer	TKO	4	16/08/1956	(United States) Auditorium, Portland, Oregon	Referee stopped the bout at 2:17 of the fourth round.
Win	15–0	(Cuba) Nino Valdes	KO	8	11/07/1956	(United States) Miami Beach Auditorium, Miami Beach, Florida	
Win	14–0	(United States) Matt Jackson	TKO	4	18/06/1956	(United States) San Francisco Botanical Garden, San Francisco, California	Referee stopped the bout at 2:51 of the fourth round.
Win	13–0	(Cuba) Nino Valdes	UD	10	16/04/1956	(United States) Cow Palace, Daly City, California	
Win	12–0	(Cuba) Julio Mederos	UD	10	22/02/1956	(United States) San Francisco Botanical Garden, San Francisco, California	
Win	11–0	(United States) Ben Wise	UD	10	12/12/1955	(United States) San Francisco, San Francisco, California	
Win	10–0	(United States) Max Chris	KO	1	22/11/1955	(United States) Auditorium, Richmond, California	Chris knocked out at 1:09 of the first round.
Win	9–0	(United States) Howard "Honeyboy" King	TKO	10	27/09/1955	(United States) Auditorium, Richmond, California	
Win	8–0	(United States) Bill Davis	KO	1	13/09/1955	(United States) Auditorium, Richmond, California	Davis knocked out at 1:22 of the first round. Davis knocked through the ropes after the KO.
Win	7–0	(United States) Frank Buford	TKO	8	26/08/1955	(United States) Cow Palace, Daly City, California	Referee stopped the bout at 2:45 of the eighth round.
Win	6–0	(United States) Shamus Jones	KO	2	08/08/1955	(United States) San Francisco, California	Jones knocked out at 2:39 of the second round.
Win	5–0	(United States) Artie Lucido	KO	1	22/06/1955	(United States) Polo Grounds, New York City	Lucido knocked out at 2:19 of the first round. Lucido retired after this fight.
Win	4–0	(United States) Clarence Williams	KO	3	14/05/1955	(United States) Redding, California	
Win	3–0	(United States) George Kennedy	KO	1	13/04/1955	(United States) Cow Palace, Daly City, California	Kennedy knocked out at 0:29 of the first round. This was the first time Kennedy had ever been down.
Win	2–0	Ed Robertson	TKO	1	29/03/1955	(United States) Auditorium, Richmond, California	Referee stopped the bout at 2:01 of the first round.
Win	1–0	(United States) Raul Flores	KO	1	22/03/1955	(United States) Sacramento, California	Flores knocked out at 1:04 of the first round.
