= Muhammad Ali vs. Zora Folley =

Boxing competition

- Date: March 22, 1967
- Venue: Madison Square Garden, New York City, New York
- Title(s) on the line: WBA, WBC, NYSAC, and The Ring undisputed heavyweight championship

Tale of the tape
Boxer	(United States) Muhammad Ali	(United States) Zora Folley
Nickname	"The Greatest"	"Bell"
Hometown	Louisville, Kentucky	Dallas, Texas
Pre-fight record	28–0 (22 KO)	74–7–4 (40 KO)
Age	25 years, 2 months	35 years, 9 months
Height	6 ft 3 in (191 cm)	6 ft 1 in (185 cm)
Weight	211 lb (96 kg)	203 lb (92 kg)
Style	Orthodox	Orthodox
Recognition	WBA, WBC, NYSAC, and The Ring; Undisputed Heavyweight Champion	The Ring; No. 1 Ranked Heavyweight

Result
- Ali won via 7th round KO

Muhammad Ali vs. Zora Folley was a professional boxing match contested on March 22, 1967, for the undisputed heavyweight championship.

== Background ==
This was first World Heavyweight Championship bout to be held at Madison Square Garden since Ezzard Charles vs. Lee Oma in January 1951.

== The fight ==
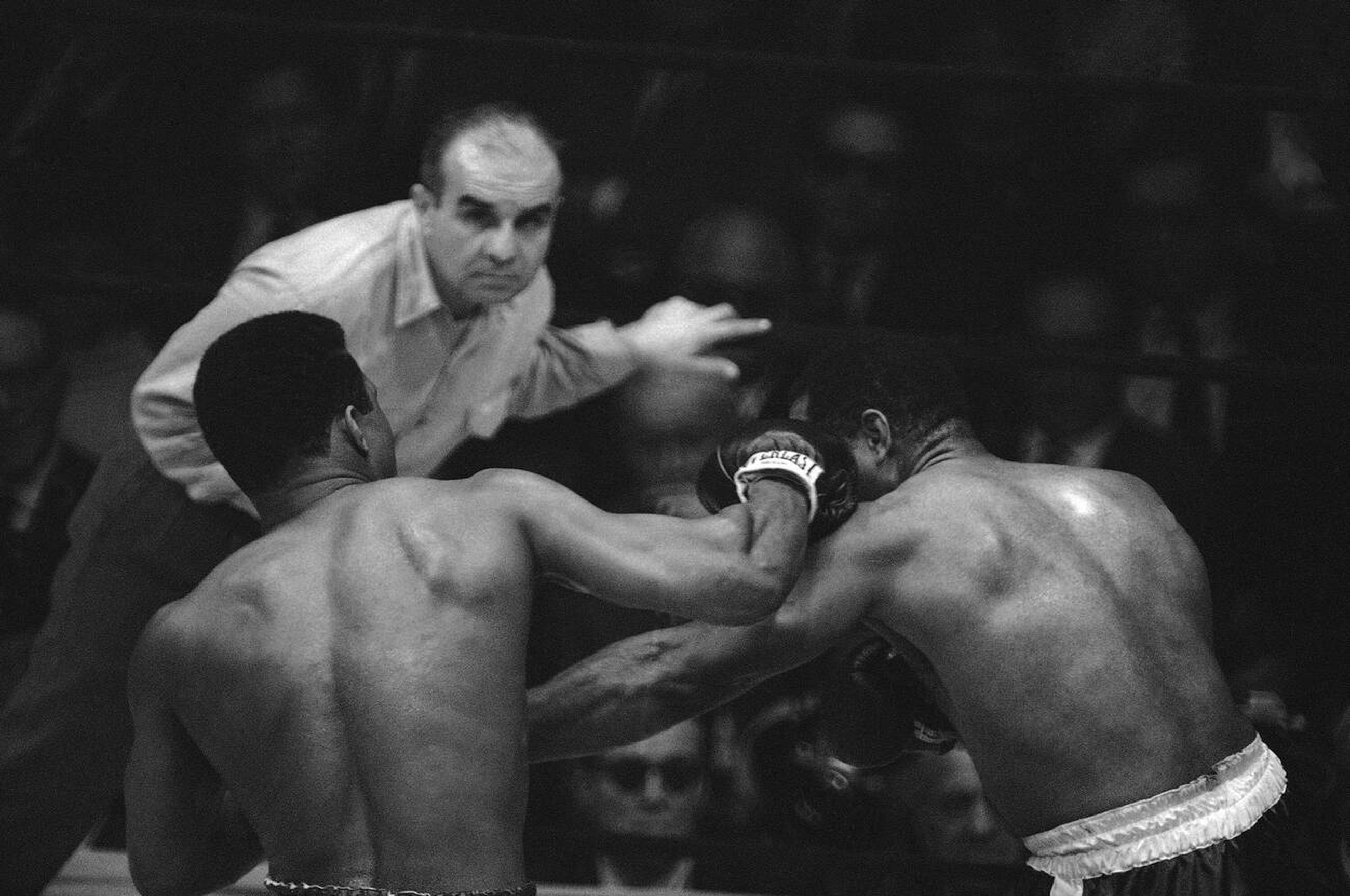

Ali won the bout by knocking out Folley in the seventh round.

== Aftermath ==
This would be Ali's last boxing match before his suspension from boxing.

== Undercard ==
Confirmed bouts:

== Broadcasting ==
Country	Broadcaster
Philippines	ABS-CBN
United Kingdom	BBC

Preceded by vs. Ernie Terrell	Muhammad Ali's bouts 22 March 1967	Succeeded by vs. Jerry Quarry
Preceded by vs. Floyd Joyner	Zora Folley's bouts 22 March 1967	Succeeded by vs. Wayne Kindred
