= Niño Valdés =

Cuban boxer

Personal information
- Born: Geraldo Ramos Ponciano Valdés; December 5, 1924 Havana, Cuba
- Died: June 3, 2001 (aged 76) New York City, US
- Height: 1.91 m (6 ft 3 in)
- Weight: Heavyweight

Boxing career
- Reach: 198 cm (78 in)
- Stance: Orthodox

Boxing record
- Total fights: 70
- Wins: 48
- Win by KO: 36
- Losses: 18
- Draws: 3
- No contests: 1

Niño Valdés (born Geraldo Ramos Ponciano Valdés, also known as Nino Valdés) (December 5, 1924 – June 3, 2001) was a Cuban professional boxer who was Cuba's national heavyweight boxing champion in the 1940s and 1950s. Statistical boxing website BoxRec rates Valdés as the 8th best Cuban boxer ever across all weight divisions.

== Professional career ==
=== Heavyweight contender ===
Valdés was a top contender for the heavyweight title during the mid-1950s, although he never received a shot due to his mixed results in the ring. Ring Magazine ranked Valdez as high as the #2 contender in its annual rankings for 1958 and he was highly ranked in several other years.

After a string of four losses to notable fighters such as Harold Johnson, Archie Moore, and Bob Baker in 1952 and 1953, he went undefeated in an impressive run of 11 consecutive victories which saw him defeat Ezzard Charles and Tommy "Hurricane" Jackson. However, the streak came to an end when he lost a rematch to Moore by a fifteen-round unanimous decision on May 2, 1955. He lost another fight to Bob Satterfield three months later. After beating former title contender Don Cockell, he lost a ten-round unanimous decision to Bob Baker on December 7, 1955, costing him a potential title bout against Rocky Marciano.

=== Later career and retirement ===
He continued boxing, losing to heavyweight contenders Zora Folley, Eddie Machen, and Sonny Liston. After defeating contender Brian London in December 1959, Valdés retired due to eye problems.

After retirement, he worked as a security guard and a bouncer.

== Professional boxing record ==
70 fights	48 wins	18 losses
By knockout	36	5
By decision	12	13
Draws	3	
No contests	1	

No.	Result	Record	Opponent	Type	Round	Date	Age	Location	Notes
70	Win	48–18–3 (1)	Brian London	RTD	7 (10)	Dec 1, 1959	34 years, 361 days	Empire Pool, Wembley, London, England, U.K.	
69	Loss	47–18–3 (1)	Sonny Liston	KO	3 (10)	Aug 5, 1959	34 years, 243 days	Chicago Stadium, Chicago, Illinois, U.S.	
68	Loss	47–17–3 (1)	Alonzo Johnson	UD	10	May 29, 1959	34 years, 175 days	Madison Square Garden, New York City, New York, U.S.	
67	Win	47–16–3 (1)	Danny Hodge	TKO	8 (10)	Apr 28, 1959	34 years, 144 days	Forum, Wichita, Kansas, U.S.	
66	Loss	46–16–3 (1)	Charlie Powell	TKO	8 (10)	Mar 4, 1959	34 years, 89 days	Auditorium, Miami Beach, Florida, U.S.	
65	Win	46–15–3 (1)	Pat McMurtry	TKO	1 (10)	Dec 19, 1958	34 years, 14 days	Madison Square Garden, New York City, New York, U.S.	
64	Win	45–15–3 (1)	Mike DeJohn	SD	10	Aug 15, 1958	33 years, 253 days	War Memorial Auditorium, Rochester, New York, U.S.	
63	Win	44–15–3 (1)	Harold Carter	TKO	9 (10)	Jul 9, 1958	33 years, 216 days	Coliseum, Spokane, Washington, U.S.	
62	Win	43–15–3 (1)	Johnny Summerlin	KO	5 (10)	May 24, 1958	33 years, 170 days	Fairground Racing Oval, Detroit, Michigan, U.S.	
61	Win	42–15–3 (1)	Mike DeJohn	SD	10	Apr 23, 1958	33 years, 139 days	State Fair Coliseum, Syracuse, New York, U.S.	
60	Win	41–15–3 (1)	Wayne Bethea	SD	10	Apr 3, 1958	33 years, 119 days	Auditorium Arena, Denver, Colorado, U.S.	
59	Loss	40–15–3 (1)	Alex Miteff	SD	10	Feb 21, 1958	33 years, 78 days	Madison Square Garden, New York City, New York, U.S.	
58	Win	40–14–3 (1)	Jeff Dyer	KO	10 (10)	Nov 19, 1957	32 years, 349 days	Auditorium, Bangor, Maine, U.S.	
57	Win	39–14–3 (1)	John Holman	UD	10	May 8, 1957	32 years, 154 days	Auditorium, Portland, Oregon, U.S.	
56	Win	38–14–3 (1)	Joe Erskine	KO	1 (10)	Feb 19, 1957	32 years, 76 days	Earls Court Arena, London, England, U.K.	
55	Win	37–14–3 (1)	Hans Friedrich	TKO	6 (10)	Dec 30, 1956	32 years, 25 days	Arena Westfalenhalle, Dortmund, Nordrhein-Westfalen, West Germany	
54	Win	36–14–3 (1)	Dick Richardson	RTD	8 (10)	Dec 4, 1956	31 years, 365 days	Harringay Arena, London, England, U.K.	
53	Win	35–14–3 (1)	Bob Woodall	KO	3 (10)	Oct 25, 1956	31 years, 325 days	Arena, Boston, Massachsuetts, U.S.	
52	Loss	34–14–3 (1)	Zora Folley	UD	10	Sep 25, 1956	31 years, 295 days	Softball Park, Phoenix, Arizona, U.S.	
51	Loss	34–13–3 (1)	Eddie Machen	KO	8 (10)	Jul 11, 1956	31 years, 219 days	Auditorium, Miami Beach, Florida, U.S.	
50	Win	34–12–3 (1)	Ken Hammer	TKO	8 (10)	Jun 1, 1956	31 years, 179 days	Coliseum, Charlotte, North Carolina, U.S.	
49	Loss	33–12–3 (1)	Eddie Machen	UD	10	Apr 16, 1956	31 years, 133 days	Cow Palace, Daly City, California, U.S.	
48	Loss	33–11–3 (1)	Bob Baker	UD	10	Dec 7, 1955	31 years, 2 days	Arena, Cleveland, Ohio, U.S.	
47	Win	33–10–3 (1)	Don Cockell	RTD	3 (10)	Sep 13, 1955	30 years, 282 days	White City Stadium, London, England, U.K.	
46	Loss	32–10–3 (1)	Bob Satterfield	UD	10	Aug 17, 1955	30 years, 255 days	Chicago Stadium, Chicago, Illinois, U.S.	
45	Loss	32–9–3 (1)	Archie Moore	PTS	15	May 2, 1955	30 years, 148 days	Cashman Field, Las Vegas, Nevada, U.S.	For vacant world heavyweight title recognized only by Nevada
44	Win	32–8–3 (1)	Jack Flood	KO	7 (10)	Jan 25, 1955	30 years, 51 days	Radio Center Arena, Huntington, West Virginia, U.S.	
43	Win	31–8–3 (1)	Jimmy Walls	KO	2 (10)	Dec 11, 1954	30 years, 6 days	King's Stadium, Hamilton, Bermuda	
42	Win	30–8–3 (1)	Tommy Jackson	TKO	2 (10)	Jul 14, 1954	29 years, 221 days	Madison Square Garden, New York City, New York, U.S.	
41	Win	29–8–3 (1)	Karel Sys	TKO	4 (10)	May 22, 1954	29 years, 168 days	Palais des Sports, Schaerbeek, Belgium	
40	Win	28–8–3 (1)	James J. Parker	UD	10	Mar 12, 1954	29 years, 97 days	Madison Square Garden, New York City, New York, U.S.	
39	Win	27–8–3 (1)	Archie McBride	SD	10	Feb 20, 1954	29 years, 77 days	Palacio de Deportes, Havana, Cuba	
38	Win	26–8–3 (1)	Heinz Neuhaus	KO	4 (10)	Nov 15, 1953	28 years, 345 days	Westfalenhalle, Dortmund, Nordrhein-Westfalen, West Germany	
37	Win	25–8–3 (1)	Matt Daniels	TKO	2 (10)	Sep 29, 1953	28 years, 298 days	Fort Homer Hesterly Armory, Tampa, Florida, U.S.	
36	Win	24–8–3 (1)	Charley Williams	UD	10	Sep 15, 1953	28 years, 284 days	Auditorium, Miami Beach, Florida, U.S.	
35	Win	23–8–3 (1)	Ezzard Charles	UD	10	Aug 11, 1953	28 years, 249 days	Auditorium, Miami Beach, Florida, U.S.	
34	Win	22–8–3 (1)	Omelio Agramonte	TKO	10 (12)	Jul 18, 1953	28 years, 225 days	Palacio de Deportes, Havana, Cuba	
33	Loss	21–8–3 (1)	Bob Baker	UD	10	May 21, 1953	28 years, 167 days	Radio Center Arena, Huntington, West Virginia, U.S.	
32	Loss	21–7–3 (1)	Billy Gilliam	SD	10	Apr 20, 1953	28 years, 136 days	War Memorial Arena, Johnstown, Pennsylvania, U.S.	
31	Loss	21–6–3 (1)	Archie Moore	UD	10	Mar 11, 1953	28 years, 96 days	Arena, Saint Louis, Missouri, U.S.	
30	Loss	21–5–3 (1)	Harold Johnson	UD	10	Nov 24, 1952	27 years, 355 days	Eastern Parkway Arena, New York City, New York, U.S.	
29	Win	21–4–3 (1)	Jimmy Walker	KO	6 (8)	Jun 13, 1952	27 years, 191 days	Madison Square Garden, New York City, New York, U.S.	
28	Draw	20–4–3 (1)	Joe McFadden	PTS	8	Mar 29, 1952	27 years, 115 days	Ridgewood Grove, New York City, New York, U.S.	
27	Win	20–4–2 (1)	Sandy McPherson	UD	8	Feb 28, 1952	27 years, 85 days	Sunnyside Garden, New York City, New York, U.S.	
26	Win	19–4–2 (1)	Keene Simmons	UD	10	Feb 7, 1952	27 years, 64 days	Sunnyside Garden, New York City, New York, U.S.	
25	Win	18–4–2 (1)	Joe McFadden	KO	7 (8)	Jan 4, 1952	27 years, 30 days	Sunnyside Garden, New York City, New York, U.S.	
24	Win	17–4–2 (1)	Aldo Rodriguez	TKO	1 (8)	Sep 23, 1950	25 years, 292 days	Palacio de Deportes, Havana, Cuba	
23	Win	16–4–2 (1)	Juan Carlos Vigo	KO	1 (8)	Aug 19, 1950	25 years, 257 days	Palacio de Deportes, Havana, Cuba	
22	Win	15–4–2 (1)	Tommy Bevil	TKO	3 (10)	Feb 21, 1950	25 years, 78 days	Jacksonville, Florida, U.S.	
21	Loss	14–4–2 (1)	Archie McBride	PTS	8	Nov 26, 1948	23 years, 357 days	Armory, Reading, Pennsylvania, U.S.	
20	Win	14–3–2 (1)	Doc Bee	PTS	6	Nov 15, 1948	23 years, 346 days	Coliseum, Baltimore, Maryland, U.S.	
19	Draw	13–3–2 (1)	Jimmy Freeman	PTS	6	Oct 19, 1948	23 years, 319 days	Auditorium, Hartford, Connecticut, U.S.	
18	NC	13–3–1 (1)	Cheo Morejon	NC	5 (10)	Jul 19, 1947	22 years, 226 days	Palacio de Deportes, Havana, Cuba	Fight stopped for "poor effort"
17	Win	13–3–1	Aldo Rodriguez	PTS	8	Jun 28, 1947	22 years, 205 days	Palacio de Deportes, Havana, Cuba	
16	Win	12–3–1	Kid Carbajal	KO	7 (10)	Sep 19, 1946	21 years, 288 days	Cienfuegos, Cuba	
15	Draw	11–3–1	Cheo Morejon	PTS	10	Mar 9, 1946	22 years, 3 days	Sancti Spiritus, Cuba	
14	Win	11–3	Federico Malibran	KO	8 (12)	Dec 8, 1945	21 years, 3 days	Ciego de Avila, Cuba	Won Cuban heavyweight title
13	Loss	10–3	Federico Malibran	KO	4 (12)	Sep 15, 1945	20 years, 284 days	Palacio de Deportes, Havana, Cuba	For Cuban heavyweight title
12	Win	10–2	Epifanio Perez	KO	2 (8)	Sep 24, 1944	19 years, 294 days	Candelaria, Cuba	
11	Loss	9–2	Mario Raul Ochoa	PTS	8	Sep 3, 1944	19 years, 273 days	Candelaria, Cuba	
10	Win	9–1	Andres Ferrer	KO	2 (8)	Jul 30, 1944	19 years, 238 days	Candelaria, Cuba	
9	Win	8–1	Julio Lazaro Diaz	TKO	7 (10)	Apr 3, 1943	18 years, 119 days	Arena Cristal, Havana, Cuba	
8	Win	7–1	Benito Garcia Malpica	TKO	2 (10)	Feb 20, 1943	18 years, 77 days	Arena Cristal, Havana, Cuba	
7	Win	6–1	Andres Dominguez	KO	2 (8)	Jan 20, 1943	18 years, 46 days	Arena Cristal, Havana, Cuba	
6	Win	5–1	Jose Andres Hornedo	KO	2 (6)	Oct 10, 1942	17 years, 309 days	Arena Cristal, Havana, Cuba	
5	Win	4–1	Epifanio Perez	KO	2 (4)	Aug 15, 1942	17 years, 253 days	Arena Cristal, Havana, Cuba	
4	Loss	3–1	Julio Lazaro Diaz	KO	3 (6)	May 30, 1942	17 years, 176 days	Arena Cristal, Havana, Cuba	
3	Win	3–0	Wilfredo Ferrer	KO	1 (6)	Mar 28, 1942	17 years, 113 days	Arena Cristal, Havana, Cuba	
2	Win	2–0	Andres Dominguez	KO	1 (6)	Jan 31, 1942	17 years, 57 days	Arena Cristal, Havana, Cuba	
1	Win	1–0	Basilio Ayestaran	KO	3 (6)	Dec 27, 1941	17 years, 22 days	Palacio de Deportes, Havana, Cuba	
