= Tommy Jackson (boxer) =

American boxer

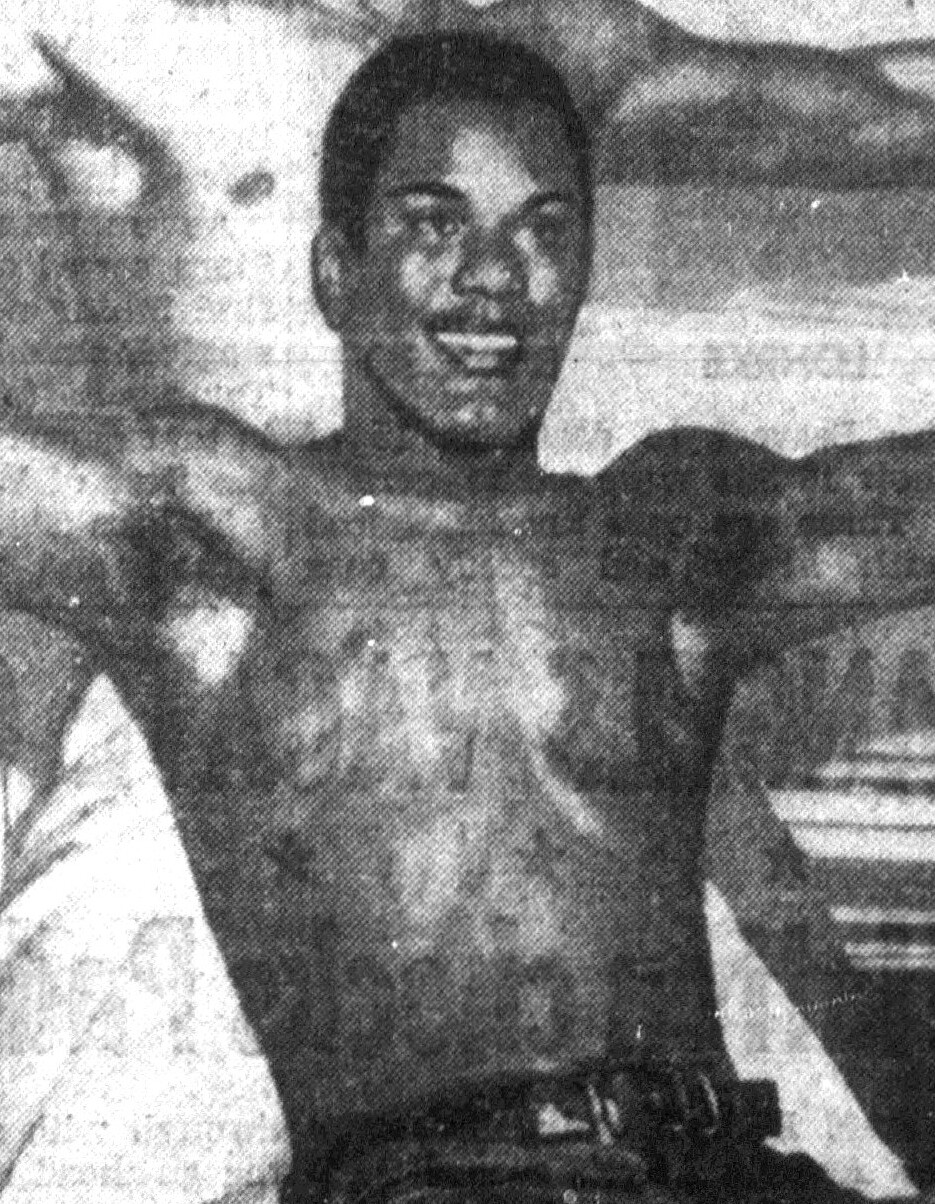
- Jackson in 1954

Personal information
- Nickname: Hurricane
- Born: Thomas Jackson; August 9, 1931 Sparta, Georgia, U.S.
- Died: February 14, 1982 (aged 50) New York City
- Weight: Heavyweight

Boxing career
- Stance: Orthodox

Boxing record
- Total fights: 44
- Wins: 34
- Win by KO: 16
- Losses: 9
- Draws: 1

Thomas Jackson (August 9, 1931 – February 14, 1982), often known as "Hurricane" Jackson, was an American professional boxer who competed from 1951 to 1961. In July 1957, he fought Floyd Patterson for the heavyweight championship. Jackson was noted for his stamina, bravery, and unorthodox style as a fighter. He was trained and managed by Whitey Bimstein.

Jackson, who was said to employ a "wild, windmill attack" was known to throw a double uppercut, in which he held both hands together as he brought them up.

While Jackson never won the Heavyweight title, he defeated some notable heavyweights, including tough contender Bob Baker and former champion Ezzard Charles, whom Jackson beat twice in 1955. In February 1956, he was ranked behind Light Heavyweight champion Archie Moore as a contender for Rocky Marciano's heavyweight title.

He fought two bouts with Floyd Patterson. In June 1956 he and Patterson fought in an elimination fight to see who would fight for the heavyweight championship left vacant by Rocky Marciano's retirement. Jackson lost a twelve-round split decision. In July 1957 Jackson fought Patterson again, this time for the heavyweight championship held by Patterson. Jackson lost in the tenth round by technical knockout. He fought on with limited success and had his final bout in 1960. After a few exhibition bouts in 1961, he retired, permanently leaving the ring.

In his later life he worked shining shoes and as a taxi driver. While driving his cab in late 1981 he was hit by a car and was critically injured. He died in 1982 in New York City due to his injuries.

Jackson was famous for bravery in the ring and at times taking much punishment. At one stage his license was suspended to help recovery.

His overall career record was 34 wins (with 16 knockouts), nine losses, and one draw.

== Professional boxing record ==
44 fights	34 wins	9 losses
By knockout	16	4
By decision	18	5
Draws	1	

No.	Result	Record	Opponent	Type	Round, time	Date	Location	Notes
44	Loss	34–9–1	Hans Kalbfell	KO	8 (10)	Oct 1, 1960	Westfalenhalle, Dortmund, Germany	
43	Loss	34–8–1	Howard King	MD	10	Aug 22, 1960	Moana Ball Park, Reno, Nevada, US	
42	Win	34–7–1	Jim O'Connell	TKO	4 (10), 2:13	Jul 21, 1960	Steubenville, Pennsylvania, US	
41	Win	33–7–1	Howard King	TKO	10 (10), 1:45	Nov 5, 1959	Fairgrounds Arena, Boise, Idaho, US	
40	Win	32–7–1	George Logan	UD	10	Sep 3, 1959	Fairgrounds Outdoor Arena, Boise, Idaho, US	
39	Win	31–7–1	Solomon McTier	TKO	8 (10), 3:00	Apr 24, 1959	Alabama State College Arena, Montgomery, Alabama, US	
38	Win	30–7–1	Eddie Vick	UD	10	Sep 15, 1958	Sherbrooke, Quebec, Canada	
37	Loss	29–7–1	Eddie Machen	RTD	10 (12), 3:00	Nov 13, 1957	Cow Palace, Daly City, California, US	
36	Loss	29–6–1	Floyd Patterson	TKO	10 (15), 1:52	Jul 29, 1957	Polo Grounds, New York City, New York, US	For NYSAC, NBA, and The Ring heavyweight titles
35	Win	29–5–1	Julio Mederos	UD	10	Dec 27, 1956	Arena, Milwaukee, Wisconsin, US	
34	Win	28–5–1	Bob Baker	SD	12	Sep 26, 1956	Forbes Field, Pittsburgh, Pennsylvania, US	
33	Loss	27–5–1	Floyd Patterson	SD	12	Jun 8, 1956	Madison Square Garden, New York City, New York, US	
32	Win	27–4–1	Johnny Williams	TKO	4 (10), 2:49	Apr 13, 1956	Uline Arena, Washington, DC, US	
31	Win	26–4–1	Bob Baker	MD	10	Feb 3, 1956	Madison Square Garden, New York City, New York, US	
30	Loss	25–4–1	Jimmy Slade	SD	10	Oct 28, 1955	Arena, Cleveland, Ohio, US	
29	Win	25–3–1	Rex Layne	TKO	6 (10), 0:25	Oct 7, 1955	Olympia Stadium, Detroit, Michigan, US	
28	Win	24–3–1	Ezzard Charles	UD	10	Aug 31, 1955	Arena, Cleveland, Ohio, US	
27	Win	23–3–1	Ezzard Charles	UD	10	Aug 3, 1955	War Memorial Auditorium, Syracuse, New York, US	
26	Win	22–3–1	Jimmy Slade	UD	10	Jun 27, 1955	St. Nicholas Arena, New York City, New York, US	
25	Win	21–3–1	Archie McBride	UD	10	Apr 4, 1955	St. Nicholas Arena, New York City, New York, US	
24	Win	20–3–1	Charles 'Kid' Saucer	TKO	3 (10), 2:11	Mar 15, 1955	Turner's Arena, Washington, DC, US	
23	Win	19–3–1	Roy Thomas	TKO	5 (10), 1:30	Mar 8, 1955	Valley Arena, Holyoke, Massachusetts, US	
22	Win	18–3–1	Leo Johnson	TKO	3 (10), 2:09	Feb 17, 1955	Sunnyside Garden, Sunnyside, New York City, New York, US	
21	Win	17–3–1	Keene Simmons	TKO	6 (10), 1:18	Nov 15, 1954	Arcadia Ballroom, Providence, Rhode Island, US	
20	Loss	16–3–1	Niño Valdés	TKO	2 (10), 2:35	Jul 14, 1954	Madison Square Garden, New York City, New York, US	
19	Win	16–2–1	Charley Norkus	TKO	5 (10), 2:29	May 28, 1954	Madison Square Garden, New York City, New York, US	
18	Loss	15–2–1	Jimmy Slade	UD	10	Apr 26, 1954	Eastern Parkway Arena, New York City, New York, US	
17	Win	15–1–1	Dan Bucceroni	TKO	6 (10)	Mar 29, 1954	Eastern Parkway Arena, New York City, New York, US	
16	Win	14–1–1	Clarence Henry	UD	10	Mar 1, 1954	Eastern Parkway Arena, New York City, New York, US	
15	Win	13–1–1	Rex Layne	TKO	6 (10), 1:44	Jan 25, 1954	Eastern Parkway Arena, New York City, New York, US	
14	Win	12–1–1	Archie McBride	PTS	6	Sep 4, 1953	Madison Square Garden, New York City, New York, US	
13	Win	11–1–1	Joe Lindsay	PTS	6	Aug 12, 1953	Madison Square Garden, New York City, New York, US	
12	Loss	10–1–1	Bert Whitehurst	PTS	6	Jun 30, 1953	Ridgewood Grove, New York City, New York, US	
11	Win	10–0–1	Joe Lindsay	PTS	8	May 1, 1953	St. Nicholas Arena, New York City, New York, US	
10	Win	9–0–1	Bob Golden	PTS	6	Apr 20, 1953	Eastern Parkway Arena, New York City, New York, US	
9	Win	8–0–1	Elmo Lincoln	KO	3 (6)	Mar 31, 1953	Ridgewood Grove, New York City, New York, US	
8	Win	7–0–1	Roy Thomas	PTS	8	Jan 3, 1953	Ridgewood Grove, New York City, New York, US	
7	Draw	6–0–1	Shirley Pembleton	PTS	6	Dec 12, 1952	Madison Square Garden, New York City, New York, US	
6	Win	6–0	Jimmy DiLenge	PTS	8	Nov 27, 1952	Sunnyside Garden, Sunnyside, New York City, New York, US	
5	Win	5–0	Phil Alston	PTS	6	Nov 4, 1952	Westchester County Center, White Plains, New York, US	
4	Win	4–0	Jack Jacobs	PTS	4	Oct 21, 1952	Laurel Garden, Newark, New Jersey, US	
3	Win	3–0	Gene Brixen	KO	4 (4)	Sep 22, 1952	Eastern Parkway Arena, New York City, New York, US	
2	Win	2–0	Jimmy Middleton	TKO	3 (3)	Jul 29, 1952	Bulkeley Stadium, Hartford, Connecticut, US	
1	Win	1–0	Terry Halpine	TKO	4 (4)	Jul 14, 1952	Eastern Parkway Arena, New York City, New York, US	
