= Brian London =

English boxer (1934–2021)

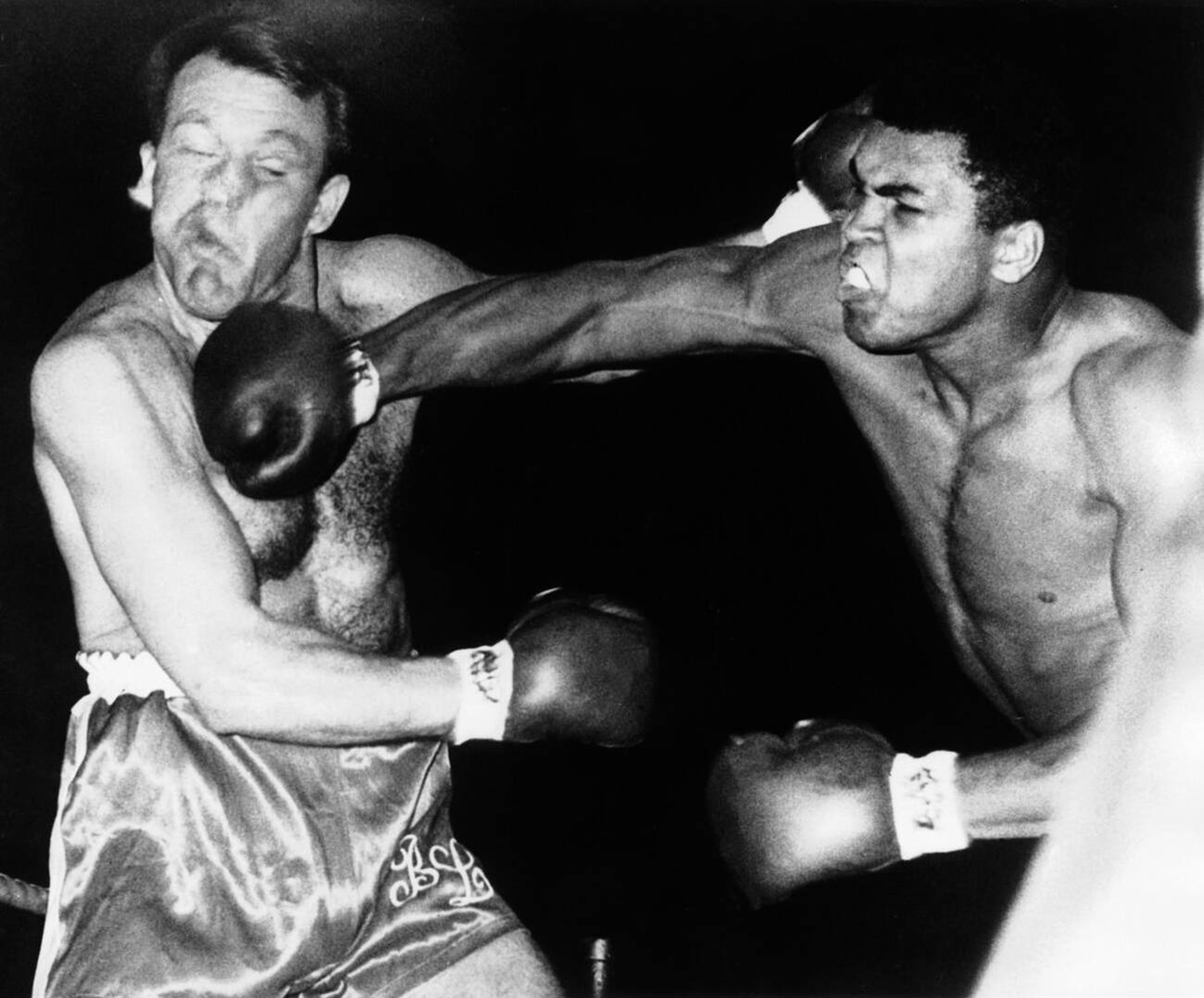
- London fighting Muhammad Ali in 1966

Personal information
- Nicknames: The Blackpool Rock; The British Bulldog
- Nationality: British
- Born: Brian Sydney Harper; 19 June 1934 West Hartlepool, County Durham, England
- Died: 23 June 2021 (aged 87)
- Weight: Heavyweight

Boxing career
- Stance: Orthodox

Boxing record
- Total fights: 58
- Wins: 37
- Win by KO: 26
- Losses: 20
- Draws: 1

Brian Sidney Harper (19 June 1934 – 23 June 2021), better known by the ring name Brian London, was an English professional boxer who competed from 1955 to 1970. He held the British and Commonwealth heavyweight title from 1958 to 1959, and twice challenged for the world heavyweight title, losing to Floyd Patterson in 1959 and Muhammad Ali in 1966, both times via knockout. He was one of a quartet of British boxers, with Henry Cooper, Joe Erskine, and Dick Richardson, who dominated the British heavyweight division's boxing scene throughout the 1950s and 1960s.

An orthodox fighter, London was 6 feet tall and fought at about 14 stone 12 pounds (208 lbs). His nicknames in the ring were "The British Bulldog" and "The Blackpool Rock".

== Early life and career ==
London was born in West Hartlepool, County Durham, on 19 June 1934. He moved to Blackpool when he was 16 years old, where he resided into his later years. His father, Jack London, beat Freddie Mills in 1944 to win the British heavyweight title. He also had a brother, Jack junior, who fought as a light-heavyweight. His father fought under the name "London" rather than Harper, as a homage to an American novelist with this name. Brian never liked the idea of boxing as a child, as he didn't like the idea of having cauliflower ears like his father and his associates. London was spurred to take up boxing during his time in the Royal Air Force for national service, after an officer learned of his familial relations. It wasn't so much of a choice, but rather the expectations of his colleagues.

He fought as an amateur before turning professional in 1955. His amateur career included representing the English team at the 1954 British Empire and Commonwealth Games held in Vancouver, Canada, where he won the gold medal in the heavyweight category.

== Professional career ==
London made a good start to his career, winning his first twelve bouts, one of which was against RAF light heavyweight boxer Brian Wiltshire (UK) in 1951. He finally lost when he came up against Henry Cooper in May 1956. Cooper stopped him with a technical knockout in the first round. Following this defeat, London continued his winning run, apart from two ten-round points defeats, against Heinz Neuhaus in Dortmund, in 1957 and against the talented American Willie Pastrano in February 1958.

=== British heavyweight title ===
In June 1958, London fought Joe Erskine, the Welsh boxer, for the British and Commonwealth heavyweight titles. The fight was at the White City Stadium, London, and London took the titles with an eighth-round knockout. He followed this in September with a revenge win against Willie Pastrano, by a technical knockout in the fifth round. On 12 January 1959, London lost his titles in a fight against Henry Cooper, losing for the second time to the Londoner by a points decision after fifteen rounds.

=== World title fight ===
In May 1959 he was given the chance of a world title fight against current champion Floyd Patterson, but he lost the bout in Indianapolis by a knockout in the eleventh. He also lost to the Cuban Nino Valdez later that year, by a technical knockout in the seventh. However, in January 1960, London bounced back when he beat the American Pete Rademacher by a knockout in the seventh.

=== Further domestic career ===
London challenged Dick Richardson in August 1960 for his European heavyweight title, but lost the bout in Porthcawl, Wales on a technical knockout in the eighth. This result provoked a brawl, when London's father and brother invaded the ring to protest that Richardson had used his head to open a cut on his opponent. When Richardson's trainer shouted a few remarks at London, London replied with an impressive combination of blows, decking him, and chaos broke out. As a result of the incident, London was fined by the British Boxing Board of Control.

London lost to American Eddie Machen in October 1961 by a technical knockout in the tenth, and in April 1963, he lost to Ingemar Johansson of Sweden on points over twelve rounds.

London then fought Henry Cooper for the third time in February 1964, when he challenged for his British and Commonwealth titles, as well as the vacant European title. The fight took place in Manchester, and Cooper won on points after fifteen rounds. His next fight of note was in March 1965, against the young "Golden Boy" of British boxing, Billy Walker. London won on points after ten rounds.

=== Second world title fight vs. Muhammad Ali ===
On 6 August 1966 London fought for the World Heavyweight Championship for the second time at the age of 32, when Muhammad Ali came to defend his title at Earl's Court Exhibition Hall in England. Ali at 24 years old with the advantages of height, weight, reach, speed and youth on his side, put on a masterful performance against a clearly out-classed opponent, almost hitting London at will as the fight went on. As London put it in an interview with the BBC: "he was just getting through all the time". Ali bouncingly circled continually, whilst London tracked doggedly after him for the first two rounds seemingly with a strategy of trying to land a single knock-out punch to the American champion. London succeeded in landing only one blow in the match, a left jab to Ali's jaw midway through the first round which caught Ali by surprise and left him for a moment stunned (and wide-open for a follow through right cross, which London failed to take advantage of), but the blow lacked weight and Ali was able to quickly recover. On coming out for the 3rd Round London hesitated to engage. Ali danced him into a corner and threw a rapid 12-punch combination in three seconds, with the tenth knocking London down and ending the fight.

In a post-career media interview, London described Ali as:

Big, fast and he could punch, whereas I was smaller, fatter and couldn't punch. He stopped me in three rounds and that was it, I don't think I hit him. It was good money and I got well paid for it – that's all I fought for. Every fight I ever had I always had a go, but with Muhammad Ali I thought "don't get hurt Brian", and I therefore didn't try, which was wrong, totally wrong.

=== Later career ===
In March 1967, London next fought American, Jerry Quarry, in Los Angeles, losing the fight by a unanimous decision after ten rounds. In November 1967, London had what was to be the last win in his career when he fought the talented American Zora Folley. Folley had lost a world title fight against Muhammad Ali earlier that year, and London beat him on points over ten rounds.

London had continued to fight when he was past his best, and in June 1968, he lost, by a technical knockout to Jack Bodell. In September 1969 he travelled to Oakland, California, to fight Jerry Quarry for the second time, this time being knocked out in the second round. The bout was unusual in that the bell was inadvertently rung as London was getting up after being knocked down in the second. The fighters returned to their corners and the referee, realising that the round had not finished, made them resume. London was then knocked down again and was counted out before the end of the round.

London's last fight was against the up-and-coming young boxer Joe Bugner, who would eventually take the British, Commonwealth and European titles from Henry Cooper. The bout was in May 1970, at Wembley, and Bugner won by a technical knockout in the fifth, signalling an end to London's career.

== Retirement and personal life ==
After retiring from boxing, London became a businessman in his hometown of Blackpool, owning several nightclubs, and was a fitness fanatic, running 12 miles a day. A teetotaller all of his life, in 2006 it was revealed that London was still only a few pounds over his fighting weight. He was married to Veronica Cliffe. Together, they had three children: Brian Jr., Melanie and Jack. After they divorced, he was in a domestic partnership with Beryl Hunter for 30 years until her death in 2005.

In January 1971 English footballer Bobby Moore was embroiled in what became a national media story when he and three other West Ham United players, Jimmy Greaves, Clyde Best and Brian Dear, spent the evening at London's 007 nightclub in Blackpool, the night before an important FA Cup match against Blackpool which they went on to lose 4–0, with then West Ham manager Ron Greenwood and the national media severely criticising the players. Moore later said of the incident, "I'd met Brian London on many occasions and thought it would be nice to look him up. I suppose we all realised at the time that we were leaving ourselves vulnerable".

Like many other boxers, London continued fighting long after his prime. He was 22 wins to 3 losses early in his career but lost 17 of his last 33 fights. In judging London's career it should be remembered that he fought some of the best fighters in the world, including four who at some stage were world champions – Ali, Patterson, Johansson and Pastrano.

My dad was Jack London and I was expected to fight as well. I was never a great fighter. I was just really, really fit.

— Brian London

The British Boxing website listed London at number eight in a list of the top ten post World War II British heavyweight boxers in 2004.

He had a dark sense of humour, and when asked if he would have done anything differently with Muhammad Ali, he replied, "Yeah, I should have shot him". He died on 23 June 2021 at the age of 87. He had suffered a long illness prior to his death.

== Professional boxing record ==
37 Wins (26 knockouts, 11 decisions), 20 Losses (11 knockouts, 9 decisions), 1 Draw
Result	Record	Opponent	Type	Round	Date	Location	Notes
Loss	36–20–1	(Australia) Joe Bugner	TKO	5	12 May 1970	(United Kingdom) Empire Pool, London, England	
Loss	36–19–1	(United States) Jerry Quarry	KO	2	3 Sep 1969	(United States) Oakland Arena, Oakland, California, US	
Loss	36–18–1	(United States) Jim Fletcher	TKO	1	10 April 1969	(United Kingdom) Liverpool Stadium, Liverpool, England	
Draw	36–17–1	(United States) Henry Clark	PTS	10	6 Feb 1969	(United Kingdom) Liverpool Stadium, Liverpool, England	
Loss	36–17	(United Kingdom) Jack Bodell	TKO	9	10 Jun 1968	(United Kingdom) Liverpool Stadium, Liverpool, England	
Loss	36–16	(Peru) Roberto Davila	TKO	6	29 Feb 1968	(United Kingdom) Liverpool Stadium, Liverpool, England	
Win	37–15	(United States) Zora Folley	PTS	10	13 Nov 1967	(United Kingdom) Liverpool Stadium, Liverpool, England	
Win	36–15	(United States) James J. Woody	PTS	10	15 Jun 1967	(United Kingdom) Liverpool Stadium, Liverpool, England	
Loss	35–15	(United States) Jerry Quarry	UD	10	9 Mar 1967	(United States) Olympic Auditorium, Los Angeles, California, US	
Loss	35–14	(United States) Muhammad Ali	KO	3	6 August 1966	(United Kingdom) Earls Court Arena, London, England	For WBC heavyweight title
Win	35–13	(United States) Amos Johnson	DQ	7	21 Jun 1966	(United Kingdom) Liverpool Stadium, Liverpool, England	
Loss	34–13	(United States) Thad Spencer	PTS	10	2 May 1966	(United Kingdom) Belle Vue Zoological Gardens, Manchester, England	
Win	34–12	(United States) Roger Rischer	KO	1	20 Sep 1965	(United Kingdom) Liverpool Stadium, Liverpool, England	
Win	33–12	(United Kingdom) Billy Walker	PTS	10	30 Mar 1965	(United Kingdom) Empire Pool, London, England	
Win	32–12	(Italy) Giorgio Masteghin	RTD	4	2 Feb 1965	(United Kingdom) Tower Circus, Blackpool, England	
Win	31–12	(United States) Chip Johnson	TKO	4	15 Dec 1964	(United Kingdom) Wolverhampton Civic Hall, Wolverhampton, England	
Loss	30–12	(United Kingdom) Johnny Prescott	PTS	10	13 Jun 1964	(United Kingdom) Liverpool Stadium, Liverpool, England	
Loss	30–11	(United Kingdom) Henry Cooper	PTS	15	24 Feb 1964	(United Kingdom) Belle Vue Zoological Gardens, Manchester, England	For British, European, and Commonwealth heavyweight titles
Win	30–10	(United States) Bill Nielsen	KO	4	2 Dec 1963	(United Kingdom) St James Hall, Newcastle, England	
Win	29–10	(United States) Don Warner	PTS	8	8 May 1963	(United Kingdom) Winter Gardens, Blackpool, England	
Loss	28–10	(Sweden) Ingemar Johansson	PTS	12	21 April 1963	Johanneshovs Isstadion, Stockholm, Sweden	
Win	28–9	(United States) Tom McNeeley	PTS	10	29 Jan 1963	(United Kingdom) London Olympia, London, England	
Win	27–9	(United States) Von Clay	PTS	10	11 Oct 1962	(United Kingdom) Tower Circus, Blackpool, England	
Win	26–9	(United States) Howard King	KO	6	14 Jun 1962	(United Kingdom) Blackpool, England	
Loss	25–9	(Italy) Santo Amonti	PTS	10	7 Jul 1962	Stadio Mario Rigamonti, Brescia, Italy	
Win	25–8	(United States) Young Jack Johnson	PTS	10	26 Feb 1962	(United Kingdom) Belle Vue Zoological Gardens, Manchester, England	
Loss	24–8	(United States) Eddie Machen	RTD	5	17 Oct 1961	(United Kingdom) Empire Pool, London, England	
Win	24–7	(United States) William Herman Hunter	TKO	8	24 April 1961	(United Kingdom) Manchester, England	
Loss	23–7	(Wales) Dick Richardson	TKO	8	29 Jun 1960	(United Kingdom) Coney Beach Pleasure Park, Porthcawl, Wales	For European heavyweight title
Win	23–6	(United States) Pete Rademacher	KO	7	26 April 1960	(United Kingdom) Empire Pool, London, England	
Loss	22–6	(Cuba) Nino Valdes	TKO	7	1 Dec 1959	(United Kingdom) Empire Pool, London, England	
Loss	22–5	(United States) Floyd Patterson	KO	11	1 May 1959	(United States) Indiana State Fairgrounds Coliseum, Indianapolis, Indiana, US	For world heavyweight title
Loss	22–4	(United Kingdom) Henry Cooper	PTS	15	12 Jan 1959	(United Kingdom) Empress Hall, London, England	Lost British and Commonwealth heavyweight titles
Win	22–3	(United States) Willie Pastrano	TKO	5	30 Sep 1958	(United Kingdom) Harringay Arena, London, England	
Win	21–3	(United Kingdom) Joe Erskine	KO	8	3 Jun 1958	(United Kingdom) White City Stadium, London, England	Won British and Commonwealth heavyweight titles
Loss	20–3	(United States) Willie Pastrano	PTS	10	25 Feb 1958	(United Kingdom) Harringay Arena, London, England	
Win	20–2	(United States) Howie Turner	PTS	10	10 Dec 1957	(United Kingdom) Harringay Arena, London, England	
Win	19–2	(Tonga) Kitione Lave	PTS	10	12 Jun 1957	(United Kingdom) Greyhound Stadium, West Hartlepool, England	
Win	18–2	(United Kingdom) Peter Bates	KO	2	1 Jul 1957	(United Kingdom) Engineer's Club, West Hartlepool, England	
Win	17–2	(Netherlands) Willy Schagen	KO	1	27 May 1957	(United Kingdom) Maindy Stadium, Cardiff, Wales	
Win	16–2	(France) Robert Duquesne	KO	1	5 Mar 1957	(United Kingdom) Embassy Sportsdrome, Birmingham, England	
Loss	15–2	(Germany) Heinz Neuhaus	PTS	10	3 Feb 1957	Westfalenhallen, Dortmund, Germany	
Win	15–1	(Luxembourg) Werner Wiegand	KO	2	19 Nov 1956	(United Kingdom) St James Hall, Newcastle, England	
Win	14–1	(United Kingdom) Trevor Snell	KO	2	27 Jun 1956	(United Kingdom) Maindy Stadium, Cardiff, Wales	
Win	13–1	(Tonga) George Naufahu	TKO	4	9 Jul 1956	(United Kingdom) Engineer's Club, West Hartlepool, England	
Loss	12–1	(United Kingdom) Henry Cooper	TKO	1	1 May 1956	(United Kingdom) Empress Hall, London, England	
Win	12–0	(Belgium) Jose Peyre	TKO	1	13 Mar 1956	(United Kingdom) Harringay Arena, London, England	
Win	11–0	(United Kingdom) Jim Cooper	TKO	4	17 Jan 1956	(United Kingdom) Streatham Ice Arena, London, England	
Win	10–0	(United States) Basil Kew	TKO	2	6 Dec 1955	(United Kingdom) Harringay Arena, London, England	
Win	9–0	(Belgium) Prosper Beck	KO	1	11 Nov 1955	(United Kingdom) Belle Vue Zoological Gardens, Manchester, England	
Win	8–0	(Jamaica) Simon Templar	TKO	7	24 Oct 1955	(United Kingdom) Middlesbrough, England	
Win	7–0	(Spain) José González Sales	TKO	3	7 Oct 1955	(United Kingdom) Belle Vue Zoological Gardens, Manchester, England	
Win	6–0	(Belgium) Robert Eugene	PTS	8	8 Jun 1955	(United Kingdom) Engineer's Club, West Hartlepool, England	
Win	5–0	(Northern Ireland) Paddy Slavin	TKO	2	11 Jul 1955	(United Kingdom) Engineer's Club, West Hartlepool, England	
Win	4–0	(United Kingdom) Dinny Powell	KO	4	6 Jun 1955	(United Kingdom) St James Hall, Newcastle, England	
Win	3–0	(Scotland) Hugh McDonald	KO	2	23 May 1955	(United Kingdom) Engineer's Club, West Hartlepool, England	
Win	2–0	(United Kingdom) Frank Walshaw	KO	2	18 April 1955	(United Kingdom) Birmingham, England	
Win	1–0	(United Kingdom) Dennis Lockton	TKO	1	22 Mar 1955	(United Kingdom) Empress Hall, London, England	

== See also ==
- List of British heavyweight boxing champions

Achievements
Preceded by Joe Erskine	British Heavyweight Champion; Commonwealth Heavyweight Champion; 3 June 1958 – 12 January 1959	Succeeded by Henry Cooper
