= Zora Folley =

American boxer (1931–1972)

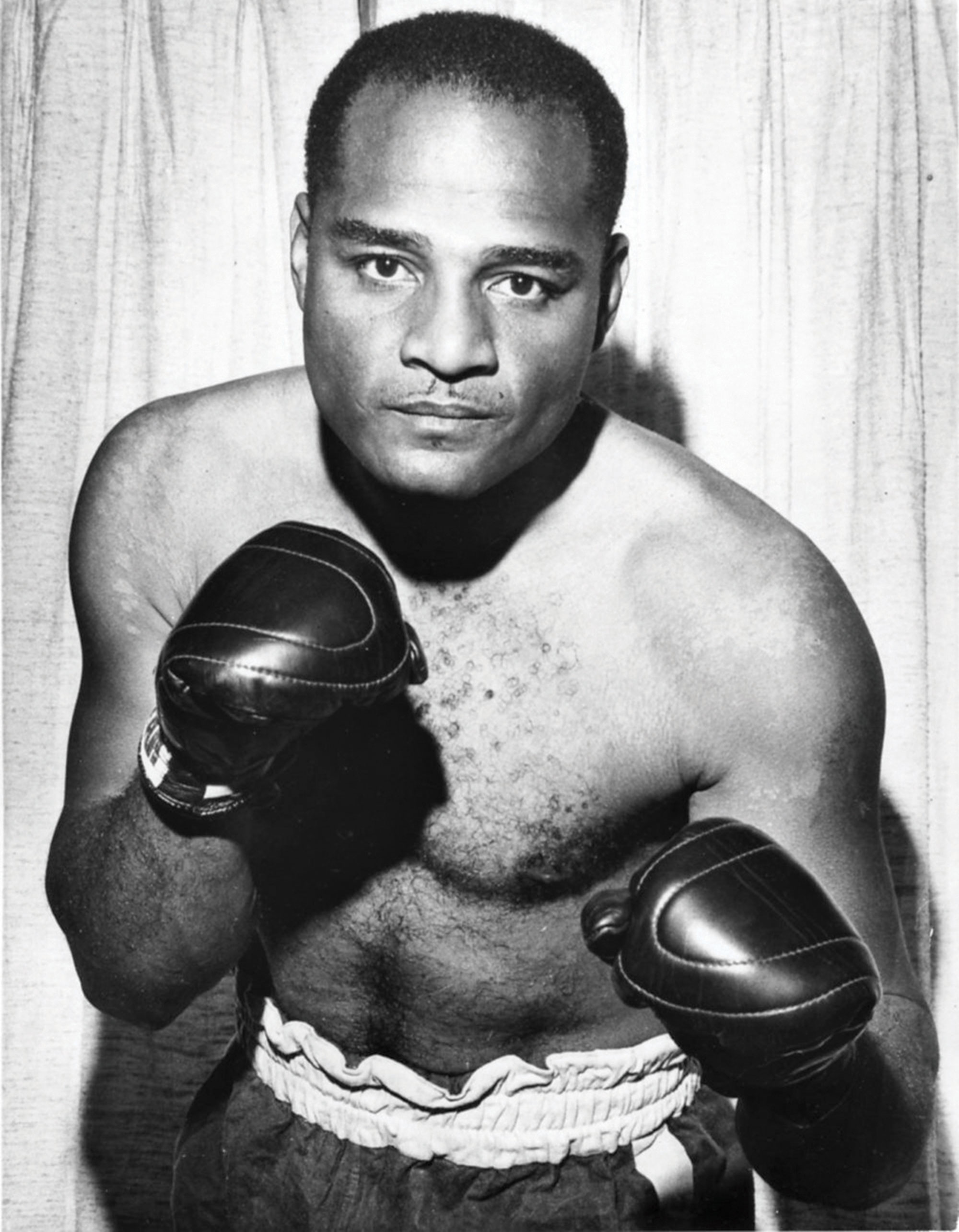
- Folley in 1972

Personal information
- Nickname: Bell
- Born: May 27, 1931 Dallas, Texas, US
- Died: July 7, 1972 (aged 41) Tucson, Arizona, US
- Height: 6 ft 1 in (185 cm)
- Weight: Heavyweight

Boxing career
- Reach: 77 in (196 cm)
- Stance: Orthodox

Boxing record
- Total fights: 96
- Wins: 79
- Win by KO: 44
- Losses: 11
- Draws: 6

Zora "Bell" Folley (May 27, 1931 – July 7, 1972) was an American heavyweight boxer who was a top 10 contender for eleven years in a row from 1956 to 1966 and a nine-time top 5 contender throughout his career, reaching a peak as number 1 contender in 1959. He beat top contenders such as Eddie Machen, George Chuvalo, Oscar Bonavena, Henry Cooper, world light-heavyweight champion Bob Foster, Nino Valdez, Doug Jones, Johnny Summerlin, Bob Cleroux and drew (tied) against Karl Mildenberger.

Folley fought once for the world heavyweight title, losing to Muhammad Ali.

== Early life ==
Born in Dallas, Texas, on May 27, 1931, Folley moved with his family to Chandler, Arizona in 1942, where he grew up playing baseball. Upon joining the U.S. Army in 1948, he began boxing and won the 6th Army Championship within a year, going on to win the All-Army and All-Service titles. He saw active service during the Korean War, earning five battle stars, and was discharged from the U.S. Army with the rank of Sergeant in 1953.

== Boxing career ==
In the mid-1950s Folley signed a professional boxing contract, winning his first pro-fight against Jimmy Ingram, then after a draw, won seventeen straight victories until losing to Johnny Summerlin in six rounds with a suspected broken jaw after being knocked down three times. Despite being considered a top contender, Folley never faced heavyweight champion Floyd Patterson. This was partly due to his points loss to Henry Cooper in England, in September 1958 (which was later avenged in December 1961 by a two-round knockout).

=== Major Bouts ===
Folley beat contenders Eddie Machen, George Chuvalo, Bob Cleroux (twice), Oscar Bonavena (the first match was one-sided with Bonavena being decked but Bonavena won the rematch three years later) and Doug Jones. He also had draws with Karl Mildenberger and Eddie Machen (their first fight), and defeated Mike De John, Alex Miteff, Pete Rademacher and Willi Besmanoff. Between 1960 and 1962 Folley was knocked out by Sonny Liston, Alejandro Lavorante, Doug Jones (in the rematch) and outpointed by Brian London.

=== Title Shot ===
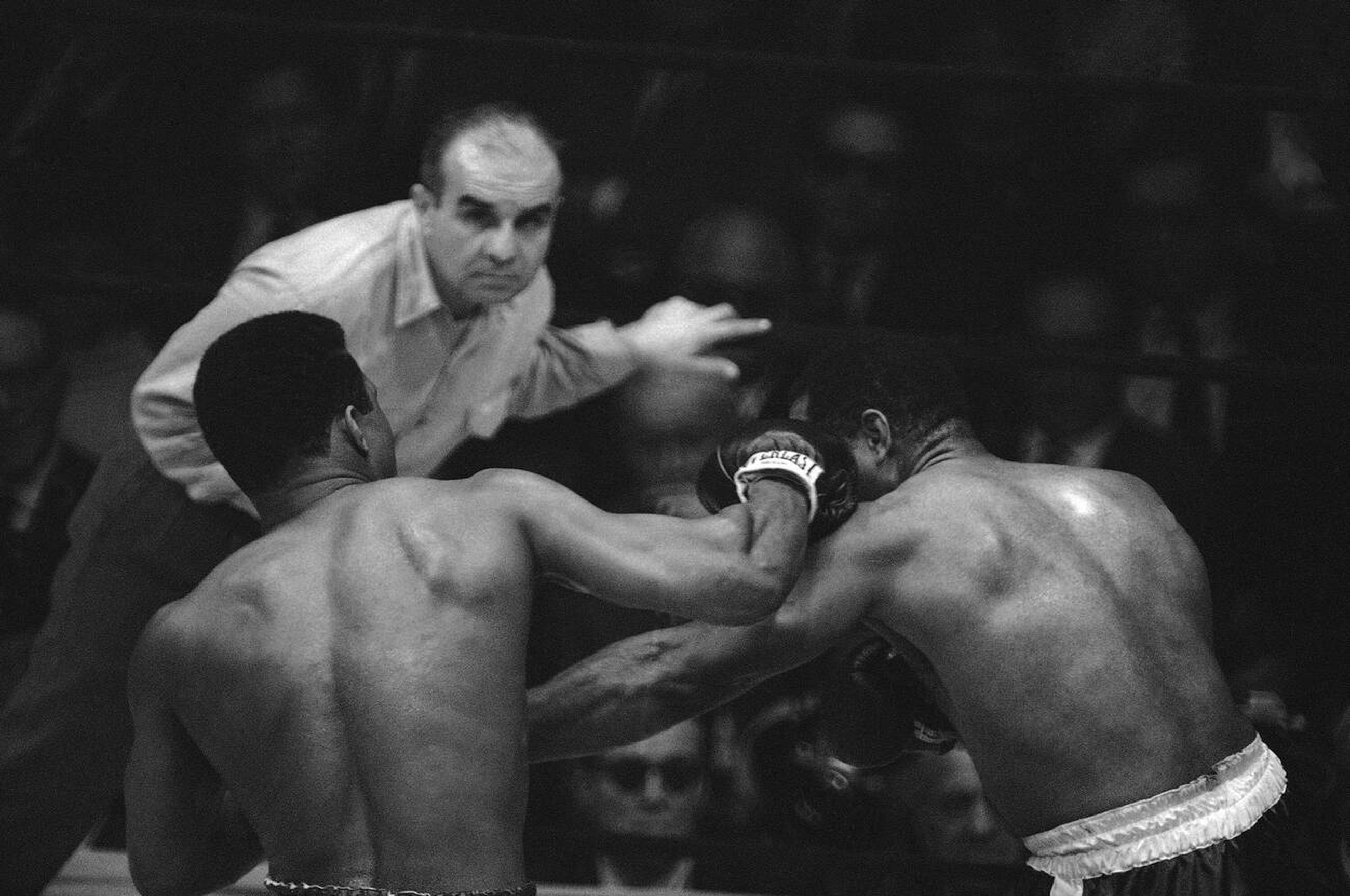
Ali punching Folley

It was not until March 22, 1967, aged 36, that he faced world heavyweight champion Muhammad Ali. Before their fight, Ali joked that Folley was such a nice man that it posed a real problem because he could not possibly get mad at him. Folley was one of the first to call the champion by his Muslim name instead of Cassius Clay. Ali stated he respected Folley and was nervous before the match. Folley was the last man to face Ali before Ali's three-year exile from boxing in 1967. Folley was knocked out in the 7th round. Folley fought for three more years afterward before being knocked out by Mac Foster in 1970.

== Personal life ==
Folley served as a member of the Chandler City Council, and raised a family of nine children with his wife Joella (1933–2011).

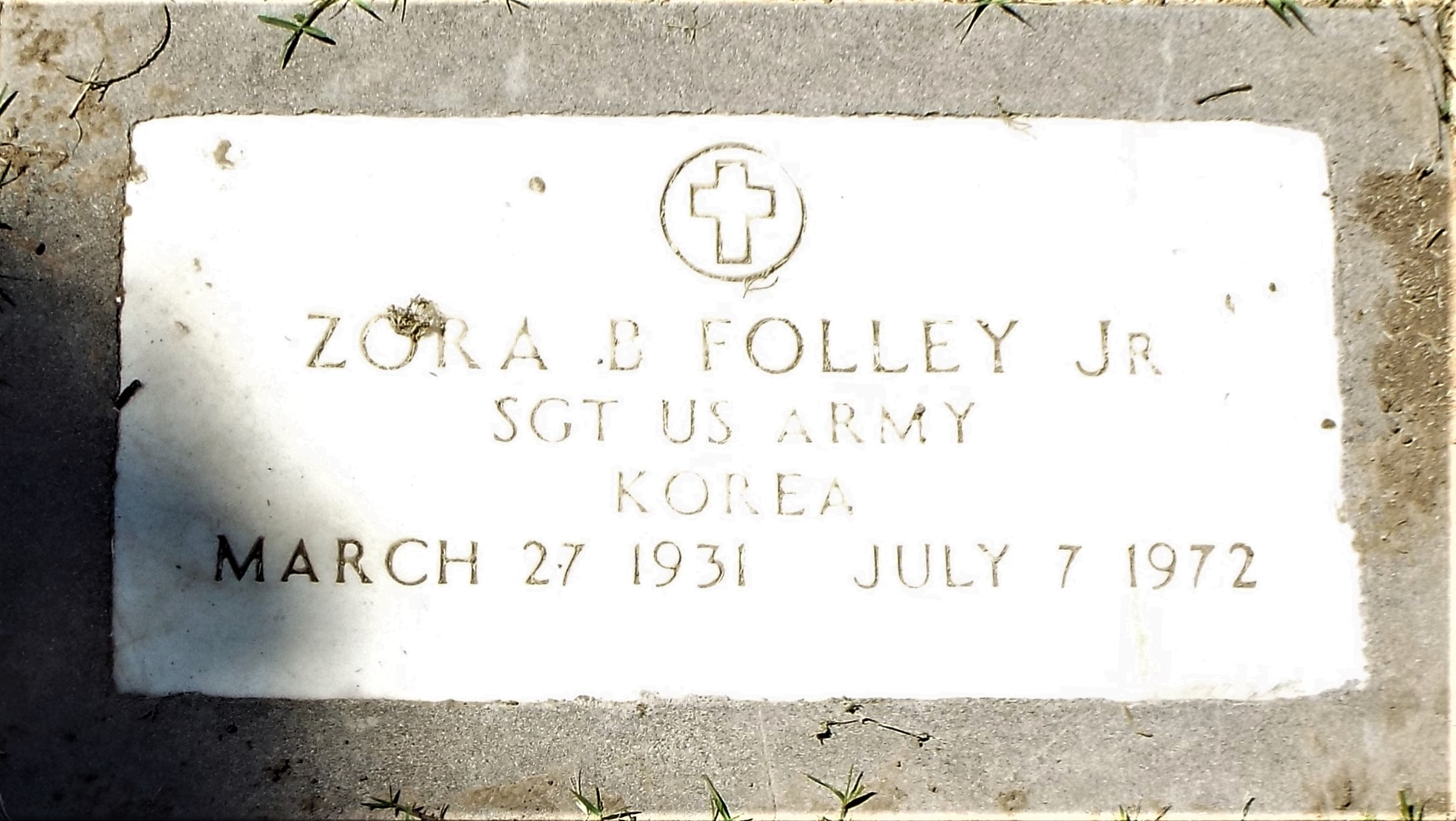
Grave of Zora Folley

Folley suffered severe head injuries in a motel swimming pool while visiting a friend in Tucson, Arizona on July 8, 1972, and died at the age of 41 in a local hospital shortly afterwards. His death was considered mysterious and subject to conspiracy theories until Marshall Terrill, a former reporter for The East Valley Tribune, tracked down official documents and an eyewitness in 2014. These sources revealed Folley had checked in at the motel under an alias with a longtime partner. Intoxicated, he dove into the pool after it had closed, and hit his head on a concrete partition.

Folley's body was buried in the City of Mesa Cemetery, Mesa, Arizona.

The city of Chandler dedicated Zora Folley Memorial Park in his honor.

A biography, Zora Folley: The Distinguished Life and Mysterious Death of a Gentleman Boxer, was published in 2017.

== Professional boxing record ==
79 Wins (44 knockouts, 35 decisions), 11 Losses (7 knockouts, 4 decisions), 6 Draws
Result	Record	Opponent	Type	Round	Date	Location	Notes
Loss	79–11–6	(United States) Mac Foster	KO	1	1970-09-29	(United States) Selland Arena, Fresno, California	Folley knocked out at 3:04 of the first round.
Win	79–10–6	(United States) Billy Joiner	UD	10	1969-11-05	(United States) Silver Slipper, Las Vegas, Nevada	
Win	78–10–6	(United States) Tommy Sims	KO	1	1969-06-16	(United States) Phoenix Municipal Stadium, Phoenix, Arizona	Sims knocked out at 2:19 of the first round.
Win	77–10–6	(United States) Sonny Moore	TKO	4	1969-01-30	(United States) Silver Slipper, Las Vegas, Nevada	Referee stopped the bout at 2:54 of the fourth round.
Loss	76–10–6	(Argentina) Oscar Bonavena	MD	10	1968-07-06	(Argentina) Estadio Luna Park, Buenos Aires	
Draw	76–9–6	(United States) Al Jones	SD	10	1968-05-14	(United States) Miami Beach Convention Hall, Miami Beach, Florida	
Draw	76–9–5	(United States) Roger Russell	SD	10	1968-03-11	(United States) Philadelphia Arena, Philadelphia	
Loss	76–9–4	(United Kingdom) Brian London	PTS	10	1967-11-13	(United Kingdom) Liverpool Stadium, Liverpool, Merseyside	
Win	76–8–4	(United States) Nick Sosa	KO	2	1967-10-04	(United States) Madison Square Garden, Phoenix, Arizona	
Win	75–8–4	(United States) Wayne Kindred	TKO	8	1967-09-18	(United States) Silver Slipper, Las Vegas, Nevada	
Loss	74–8–4	(United States) Muhammad Ali	KO	7	1967-03-22	(United States) Madison Square Garden, New York City	For WBC, WBA, The Ring, and lineal heavyweight titles
Win	74–7–4	(United States) Floyd Joyner	KO	1	1967-01-17	(United States) Sam Houston Coliseum, Houston, Texas	
Win	73–7–4	(United States) Jefferson Davis	UD	10	1966-12-13	(United States) Houston, Texas	
Win	72–7–4	(United States) Henry Clark	UD	10	1966-10-25	(United States) Sacramento Memorial Auditorium, Sacramento, California	
Win	71–7–4	(United States) Jefferson Davis	KO	8	1966-06-28	(United States) Centennial Coliseum, Reno, Nevada	
Win	70–7–4	(United States) Bob Foster	UD	10	1965-12-06	(United States) New Orleans Municipal Auditorium, New Orleans, Louisiana	
Win	69–7–4	(Argentina) Oscar Bonavena	UD	10	1965-02-26	(United States) Madison Square Garden, New York City	
Win	68–7–4	(Germany) Gerhard Zech	KO	4	1964-11-14	(Germany) Westfalenhallen, Dortmund, North Rhine-Westphalia	
Draw	67–7–4	(Germany) Karl Mildenberger	PTS	10	1964-04-17	(Germany) Festhalle Frankfurt, Frankfurt, Hesse	
Win	67–7–3	(United States) Tod Herring	TKO	7	1964-03-17	(United States) Houston, Texas	Referee stopped the bout at 1:34 of the seventh round.
Win	66–7–3	(Canada) George Chuvalo	UD	10	1964-01-17	(United States) Cleveland Arena, Cleveland, Ohio	
Win	65–7–3	(United States) Billy Daniels	UD	10	1963-10-17	(Canada) Paul Sauve Arena, Montreal, Quebec	
Win	64–7–3	(United States) Tiger Lynch	KO	5	1963-09-19	(United States) Boise, Idaho	Lynch knocked out at 1:49 of the fifth round.
Loss	63–7–3	(United States) Ernie Terrell	UD	10	1963-07-27	(United States) Madison Square Garden, New York City	
Win	63–6–3	(Canada) Bob Cleroux	UD	10	1963-05-23	(Canada) Paul Sauve Arena, Montreal, Quebec	
Draw	62–6–3	(United States) Dean Bogany	TD	5	1963-04-02	(United States) Bakersfield Civic Auditorium, Bakersfield, California	Fight stopped due to an accidental headbutt.
Loss	62–6–2	(United States) Doug Jones	KO	7	1962-12-15	(United States) Madison Square Garden, New York City	Folley knocked out at 1:58 of the seventh round.
Win	62–5–2	(United States) Dave Furch	UD	10	1962-11-19	(United States) Tucson, Arizona	
Win	61–5–2	(United States) Al Gonzalez	KO	5	1962-08-29	(United States) Madison Square Garden, Phoenix, Arizona	Al knocked out at 1:55 of the fifth round.
Win	60–5–2	(United States) Doug Jones	UD	10	1962-08-01	(United States) Denver Auditorium Arena, Denver, Colorado	
Win	59–5–2	(United States) Paul Andrews	TKO	7	1962-06-12	(United States) Sacramento, California	Referee stopped the bout at 2:00 of the seventh round.
Win	58–5–2	(Canada) Bob Cleroux	UD	10	1962-04-18	(United States) San Francisco Civic Auditorium, San Francisco, California	
Win	57–5–2	(United States) Mike DeJohn	KO	3	1962-02-15	(United States) Denver Auditorium Arena, Denver, Colorado	DeJohn knocked out at 2:24 of the third round.
Win	56–5–2	(United Kingdom) Henry Cooper	KO	2	1961-12-05	(United Kingdom) Empire Pool, Wembley, London	Cooper knocked out at 1:06 of the second round.
Win	55–5–2	(United States) Sonny Moore	UD	10	1961-09-28	(United States) El Paso County Coliseum, El Paso, Texas	
Win	54–5–2	(United States) "Big" Ben Marshall	KO	2	1961-08-30	(United States) Madison Square Garden, Phoenix, Arizona	Marshall knocked out at 2:41 of the second round.
Loss	53–5–2	(Argentina) Alejandro Lavorante	KO	7	1961-05-11	(United States) Olympic Auditorium, Los Angeles	Folley knocked out at 0:35 of the seventh round.
Win	53–4–2	(United States) Norman Letcher	TKO	5	1961-02-10	(United States) Madison Square Garden, Phoenix, Arizona	Referee stopped the bout at 1:12 of the fifth round.
Win	52–4–2	(Germany) Willi Besmanoff	UD	10	1960-09-16	(United States) SW Washington Fairgrounds, Centralia, Washington	
Loss	51–4–2	(United States) Sonny Liston	KO	3	1960-07-18	(United States) Denver Coliseum, Denver, Colorado	Folley knocked out at 0:28 of the third round.
Win	51–3–2	(United States) Clarence Williams	UD	10	1960-04-05	(United States) Sacramento, California	
Win	50–3–2	(United States) Eddie Machen	UD	12	1960-01-18	(United States) Cow Palace, Daly City, California	
Win	49–3–2	(United States) Alonzo Johnson	UD	10	1959-11-18	(United States) Caravan Inn East, Phoenix, Arizona	
Win	48–3–2	(United States) Monroe Ratliff	TKO	2	1959-10-02	(United States) San Diego Arena, San Diego, California	Referee stopped the bout at 1:58 of the second round.
Win	47–3–2	(United States) Howard King	MD	10	1959-08-04	(United States) Sacramento, California	
Win	46–3–2	(United States) Alvin Williams	KO	4	1959-07-07	(United States) Fresno Memorial Auditorium, Fresno, California	
Win	45–3–2	(Germany) Willi Besmanoff	UD	10	1959-04-07	(United States) Denver, Colorado	
Win	44–3–2	(United States) Hank Thurman	UD	10	1959-03-10	(United States) Madison Square Garden, Phoenix, Arizona	
Win	43–3–2	(Argentina) Alex Miteff	UD	10	1959-01-29	(United States) Denver Auditorium Arena, Denver, Colorado	
Win	42–3–2	(Jamaica) Joe Bygraves	TKO	9	1958-11-24	(United Kingdom) Granby Halls, Leicester, Leicestershire	Referee stopped the bout at 2:59 of the ninth round.
Loss	41–3–2	(United Kingdom) Henry Cooper	PTS	10	1958-10-14	(United Kingdom) Empire Pool, Wembley, London	
Win	41–2–2	(United States) Pete Rademacher	KO	4	1958-07-25	(United States) Olympic Auditorium, Los Angeles	Pete knocked out at 1:15 of the fourth round.
Win	40–2–2	(United States) Art Swiden	UD	10	1958-05-19	(United States) Las Vegas, Nevada	
Draw	39–2–2	(United States) Eddie Machen	SD	12	1958-04-09	(United States) Cow Palace, Daly City, California	
Win	39–2–1	(United States) Garvin Sawyer	UD	10	1958-01-01	(United States) Capitol Arena, Washington, D.C.	
Win	38–2–1	(Argentina) Edgardo Romero	TKO	4	1957-12-04	(United States) Albuquerque Civic Auditorium, Albuquerque, New Mexico	Referee stopped the bout at 2:35 of the fourth round.
Win	37–2–1	(United States) Duke Sabedong	KO	4	1957-11-21	(United States) Phoenix, Arizona	
Win	36–2–1	(United States) Monroe Ratliff	UD	10	1957-09-10	(United States) Madison Square Garden, Phoenix, Arizona	
Win	35–2–1	(Argentina) Edgardo Romero	TKO	6	1957-08-05	(United States) Dallas Memorial Auditorium, Dallas, Texas	
Win	34–2–1	(United States) Jeff Dyer	UD	10	1957-07-09	(United States) Phoenix Coliseum, Phoenix, Arizona	
Win	33–2–1	(United States) Julius Griffin	TKO	4	1957-06-18	(United States) Madison Square Garden, Phoenix, Arizona	Referee stopped the bout at 2:59 of the fourth round.
Win	32–2–1	(United States) Jimmy Wood	KO	2	1957-05-20	(United States) Sports Center, Tucson, Arizona	Wood knocked out at 1:20 of the second round.
Win	31–2–1	(United States) JD Harvey	KO	4	1957-04-18	(United States) Sports Arena, Yuma, Arizona	Harvey knocked out at 2:46 of the fourth round.
Win	30–2–1	(United States) Johnny Hollins	KO	2	1957-03-12	(United States) Madison Square Garden, Phoenix, Arizona	Hollins knocked out at 1:29 of the second round.
Win	29–2–1	(United States) Howie Turner	UD	10	1957-02-11	(United States) St. Nicholas Arena, New York City	
Win	28–2–1	(United States) Wayne Bethea	SD	10	1957-01-09	(United States) Syracuse War Memorial Arena, Syracuse, New York	
Win	27–2–1	(United States) Wayne Bethea	SD	10	1956-12-03	(United States) St. Nicholas Arena, New York City	
Win	26–2–1	(Cuba) Nino Valdes	UD	10	1956-09-25	(United States) Softball Park, Phoenix, Arizona	
Win	25–2–1	(United States) Roger Rischer	UD	12	1956-08-15	(United States) Madison Square Garden, Phoenix, Arizona	Southwestern Heavyweight Title.
Win	24–2–1	(United States) Rocky Robinson	KO	8	1956-05-28	(United States) Sports Center, Tucson, Arizona	Robinson knocked out at 1:40 of the eighth round.
Win	23–2–1	(United States) Ponce DeLeon Taylor	KO	7	1956-05-08	(United States) Phoenix Municipal Stadium, Phoenix, Arizona	de Leon knocked out at 0:03 of the seventh round.
Win	22–2–1	(United States) Alex Watson Jones	KO	3	1956-02-28	(United States) Phoenix, Arizona	Jones knocked out at 2:01 of the third round.
Loss	21–2–1	(United States) Young Jack Johnson	RTD	5	1955-12-01	(United States) Olympic Auditorium, Los Angeles	California Heavyweight Title. Folley did not come out for the sixth round due to a broken rib.
Win	21–1–1	(United States) Reuben Wilson	KO	8	1955-09-24	(United States) Clifton, Arizona	
Win	20–1–1	(United States) Ted Calaman	TKO	4	1955-09-08	(United States) Olympic Auditorium, Los Angeles	Referee stopped the bout at 1:54 of the fourth round.
Win	19–1–1	(United States) Jack Jarrod	TKO	7	1955-07-28	(United States) Olympic Auditorium, Los Angeles	Referee stopped the bout at 1:20 of the seventh round.
Loss	18–1–1	(United States) Johnny Summerlin	RTD	6	1955-06-23	(United States) Olympic Auditorium, Los Angeles	Folley did not come out for the seventh round due to a broken jaw.
Win	18–0–1	(United States) Howard King	TKO	1	1955-05-16	(United States) Kezar Stadium, San Francisco, California	Referee stopped the bout at 2:57 of the first round.
Win	17–0–1	(United States) Calvin Brad	TKO	7	1955-04-07	(United States) Olympic Auditorium, Los Angeles	Referee stopped the bout at 2:50 of the seventh round.
Win	16–0–1	(United States) Kirby Seals	TKO	5	1955-02-24	(United States) Olympic Auditorium, Los Angeles	Referee stopped the bout at 2:48 of the fifth round.
Win	15–0–1	(United States) JD Reed	TKO	8	1955-01-20	(United States) Olympic Auditorium, Los Angeles	Referee stopped the bout at 1:10 of the eighth round.
Win	14–0–1	Kid Zanzibar	KO	7	1954-12-18	(United States) Clifton, Arizona	
Win	13–0–1	(United States) Jimmy Ingram	PTS	10	1954-11-26	(United States) Madison Square Garden, Phoenix, Arizona	
Win	12–0–1	(United States) Georgie Woods	PTS	10	1954-10-23	(United States) Madison Square Garden, Phoenix, Arizona	
Win	11–0–1	(United States) Sandy McPherson	UD	8	1954-10-01	(Canada) Edmonton Gardens, Edmonton, Alberta	
Win	10–0–1	(United States) Kid Percy	KO	N/A	1954-08-28	(United States) Clifton, Arizona	
Win	9–0–1	(United States) Kirby Seals	UD	10	1954-08-13	(United States) San Diego Coliseum, San Diego, California	
Win	8–0–1	(United States) Frank Buford	UD	10	1954-07-12	(United States) Tucson, Arizona	
Win	7–0–1	(United States) Johnny Rebel	KO	1	1954-06-10	(United States) Phoenix, Arizona	
Win	6–0–1	(United States) Joe Sandell	TKO	3	1954-04-13	(United States) Softball Park, Phoenix, Arizona	
Win	5–0–1	(United States) Battling Blackjack	KO	1	1954-03-26	(United States) Clifton, Arizona	
Win	4–0–1	(United States) Howard King	TKO	7	1954-01-26	(United States) Olympic Auditorium, Los Angeles	Referee stopped the bout at 2:35 of the seventh round.
Win	3–0–1	(United States) Lonnie Malone	TKO	2	1953-12-07	(United States) Arena, South Gate, California	
Win	2–0–1	(United States) Joe Louis Brown	KO	8	1953-11-17	(United States) Phoenix, Arizona	
Draw	1–0–1	(United States) Calvin Chambers	PTS	4	1953-09-29	(United States) Olympic Auditorium, Los Angeles	
Win	1–0	(United States) Jimmy Ingram	PTS	4	1953-09-22	(United States) Olympic Auditorium, Los Angeles	

== Family ==
Robert Folley, son of Zora Folley, was fighting in the light heavyweight division making his pro debut at the Felt Forum, on June 19, 1986.
