= Muhammad Ali vs. Ernie Terrell =

Boxing competition

The Battle of Champions
- Date: February 6, 1967
- Venue: Astrodome, Houston, Texas
- Title(s) on the line: WBA, WBC, NYSAC, and The Ring undisputed heavyweight championship

Tale of the tape
Boxer	(United States) Muhammad Ali	(United States) Ernie Terrell
Nickname	"The Greatest"	"The Octopus"
Hometown	Louisville, Kentucky	Belzoni, Mississippi
Purse	$600,000	$210,000
Pre-fight record	27–0 (22 KO)	39–4 (18 KO)
Age	25 years	27 years, 10 months
Height	6 ft 3 in (191 cm)	6 ft 6 in (198 cm)
Weight	212 1/4 lb (96 kg)	212 1/2 lb (96 kg)
Style	Orthodox	Orthodox
Recognition	WBC, NYSAC, and The Ring; Heavyweight Champion	WBA; Heavyweight Champion; The Ring; No. 1 Ranked Heavyweight

Result
- Ali won via 15 round UD (148-138, 148-133, 148-137)

Muhammad Ali vs. Ernie Terrell, billed as The Battle of Champions, was a professional boxing match contested on February 6, 1967, for the undisputed heavyweight championship. The fight went 15 rounds, with Ali winning through a unanimous decision.

== Background ==
During a pre-fight interview in ABC studios, a physical altercation ensued between the two. Terrell called Ali by his birth name of Cassius Clay multiple times. Ali interrupted Terrell, asking why he called him that; Terrell noted that Ali had introduced himself by that name when they first met which Ali denied. The situation quickly escalated and Ali said "my name is Muhammad Ali" and threatened to "make [Terrell] announce it in the center of that ring if [he] don't do it now." He then called him "an old Uncle Tom, another Floyd Patterson", and further threatened "I'm gonna punish you." Terrell took offense in turn, saying "you ain't got no business callin' me an Uncle Tom. Don't call me no Uncle Tom, man." Ali yelled back "That's what you are, an Uncle Tom!", to which Terrell responded "Why you gonna call me an Uncle Tom, I ain't do nothin' to you." Ali simply yelled "Uncle Tom!" repeatedly, resulting in a shoving match between the two. In a 1979 interview, Ali said, "They billed the fight on that little grudge thing, and I wasn't really angry - I didn't care what he called me - but this was a good chance to promote my new image."

== The fight ==
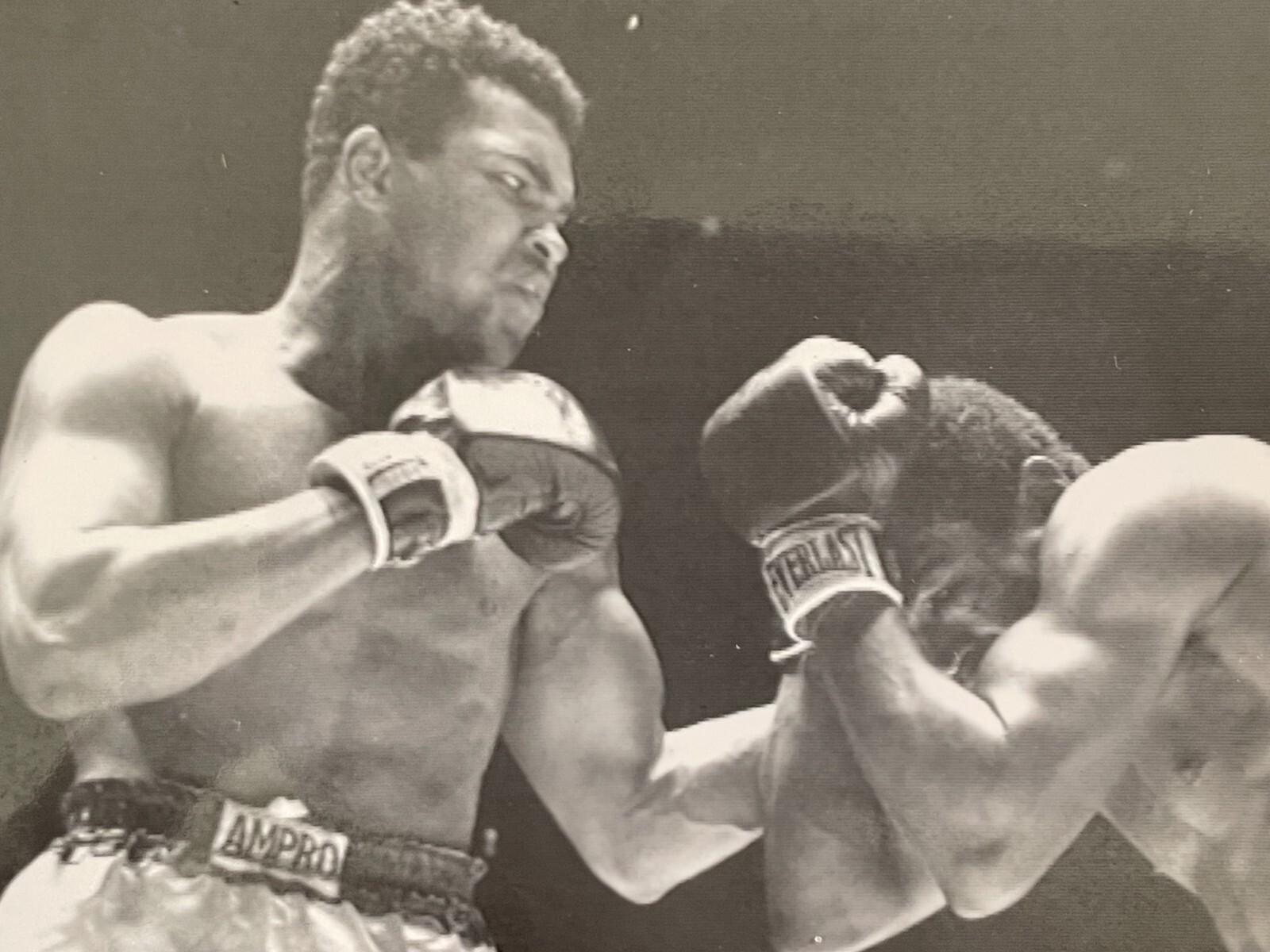

Ali was ahead in most of the rounds. In the first two rounds, Terrell was competitive, but in the third Terrell's eye started to swell, leaving him half-blind for much of the match. By the sixth round Ali was clearly ahead, though Terrell still had moments. The shift came in the seventh round, when Ali landed a left hook that sent Terrell to the ropes, and launched a flurry of blows seeking a knockout. Terrell repelled Ali with his own desperate offensive, but had wobbly legs for the remainder of the match. Terrell landed a hard right hook that forced Ali back to the ropes in turn, causing the announcer to say "Clay is hurt, Terrell is desperately fighting back." The eighth round went solidly to Ali, battering the wobbly and half-blinded Terrell, though Terrell still landed jabs and would jolt Ali with a hook. This state went on for the rest of the fight; in the 13th round, commentator and boxer George Chuvalo commented that Terrell had been unexpectedly hanging on and that Ali looked tired, predicting the fight would end with a decision rather than a knockout, which turned out to be a correct assessment. In the eighth round, Ali taunted Terrell by asking "What's my name?" and calling him "Tom", but ceased to speak to him after that point, not even saying a word to him when the match ended and both boxers went back to their respective corners. The Judges scored the bout 148–138, 148–133, and 148–137, all in favor of Ali.

== Aftermath ==
This performance was seen as vicious and made Ali unpopular with some boxing fans, due to accusations that Ali was intentionally dragging out the bout to further hurt Terrell when he could have instead gone for a knockout. Ali himself denied this, and stated he simply was not capable of knocking Terrell out despite throwing hundreds of shots at his head. He said: "I don't believe I could have. I had a couple of opportunities to knock him out, but he was so determined. I didn't realize he could take as much punishment as he did. After the eighth round I laid it on him but I found myself tiring. I had 15 rounds to go and started pacing myself." After the match, he continued to insult Terrell, saying "Ernie Terrell has no class whatsoever... It's a joke calling him a champion." Nat Fleischer in the Ring Magazine was critical of Ali's inability to gain a stoppage, unfavorably comparing him to Rocky Marciano and Joe Louis, who he insisted would have had no problem knocking Terrell out.

In an interview with The Independent, Terrell claimed he had made an honest mistake referring to Ali by his birth name.

== Undercard ==
Confirmed bouts:

Winner	Loser	Weight division/title belt(s) disputed	Result
(United States) Buster Mathis	(United States) Waban Thomas	Heavyweight (6 rounds)	1st-round KO.
(United States) Dave Zyglewicz	(United States) Roy Rogers	Heavyweight (6 rounds)	Unanimous Decision.
(United States) Mel Turnbow	(United States) L J Wheeler	Heavyweight (6 rounds)	Points.
(United States) Ron Marsh	(United States) John Collins	Heavyweight (6 rounds)	3rd-round KO.

== Broadcasting ==
The fight was broadcast live through paid closed-circuit television at select venues/theaters across the United States. The fight also had a live pay-per-view home television broadcast in Hartford.

Country	Broadcaster
Philippines	ABS-CBN
United Kingdom	BBC

Preceded by vs. Cleveland Williams	Muhammad Ali's bouts 6 February 1967	Succeeded by vs. Zora Folley
Preceded by vs. Doug Jones	Ernie Terrell's bouts 6 February 1967	Succeeded by vs. Thad Spencer
