= Ernie Terrell =

American boxer (1939–2014)

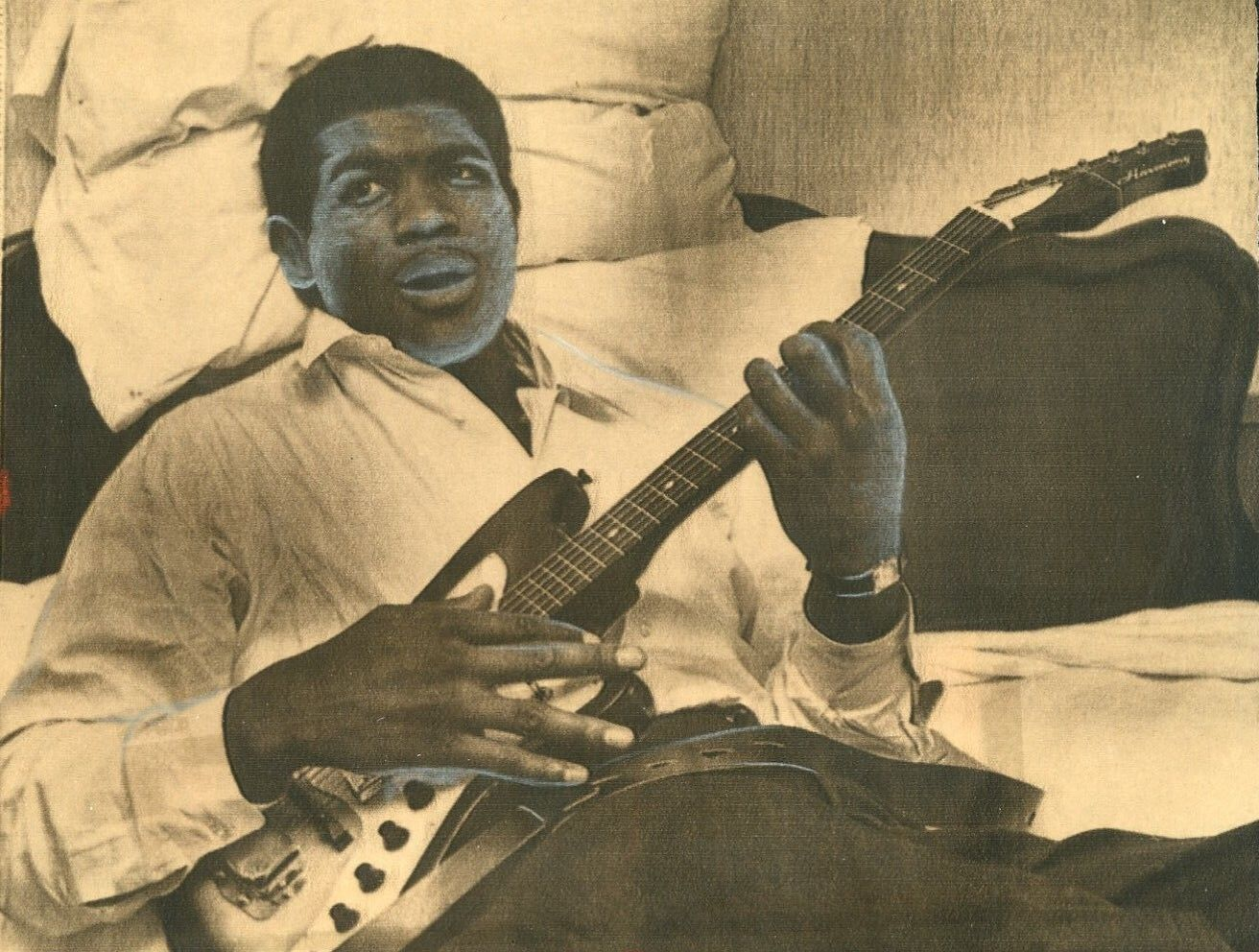
- Terrell in 1967

Personal information
- Born: Ernest Terrell; April 4, 1939 Inverness, Mississippi, U.S.
- Died: December 16, 2014 (aged 75) Evergreen Park, Illinois, U.S.
- Height: 6 ft 6 in (198 cm)
- Weight: Heavyweight

Boxing career
- Reach: 82 in (208 cm)
- Stance: Orthodox

Boxing record
- Total fights: 55
- Wins: 46
- Win by KO: 21
- Losses: 9

Ernest Terrell (April 4, 1939 – December 16, 2014) was an American professional boxer who competed from 1957 to 1973. He held the World Boxing Association's heavyweight title from 1965 to 1967, and was one of the tallest heavyweights of his era, at 6 feet 6 inches (1.98 m) tall. He unsuccessfully fought the other world heavyweight champion of the era, Muhammad Ali, in a heavyweight title unification contest in 1967, losing by a unanimous decision. Terrell was the elder brother of the Supremes' early 1970s lead singer Jean Terrell. In the 1960s, Jean sang with Ernie's group Ernie Terrell & the Heavyweights.

== Early life ==
Terrell was born on 4 April 1939 in Inverness, Mississippi, and spent his early childhood in Belzoni. He was born into a family of ten children, whose father was a Mississippi sharecropper who during Terrell's childhood moved the family north to Chicago when he found employment in the factories there. Terrell received his formal education at Farragut School in Chicago. Before turning professional, he won the 1957 Chicago Golden Gloves and then the 1957 Intercity Golden Gloves in his youth as a light heavyweight, and he also formed a pop music singing act called "The Heavyweights" with three of his siblings.

== Professional career ==
In his early career, Terrell defeated some good contenders, including Cleveland Williams (Terrell won a rematch with Williams by decision after losing their first fight by knockout), Zora Folley, and future light heavyweight champion Bob Foster.

When the World Boxing Association stripped Muhammad Ali of his title after his agreement to fight a rematch with Sonny Liston, the WBA matched Terrell and Eddie Machen for the vacant crown. Terrell defeated Machen to win the belt on March 5, 1965. During his reign as WBA champion, he defended the title twice, beating Doug Jones and George Chuvalo. Most in the boxing world continued to recognize Ali as the legitimate champion, for he had not lost his championship in a boxing match. The WBA's rival, the World Boxing Council, also continued to recognize Ali as champion. On March 29, 1966, Ali and Terrell were scheduled to fight, but Terrell backed out (Ali won a 15-round decision against substitute opponent George Chuvalo).

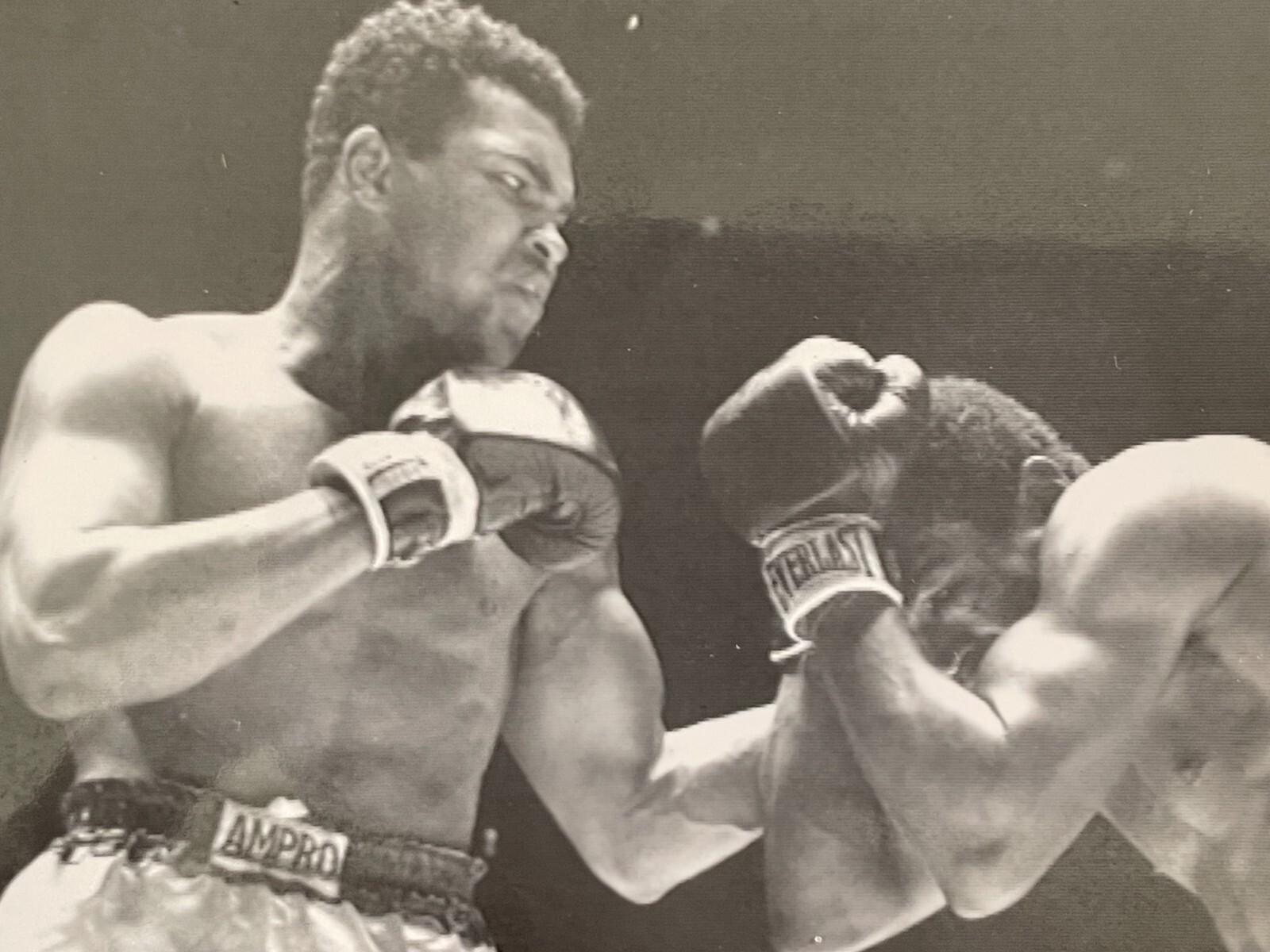
Ali punching Terrell during the fight

On February 6, 1967, Ali and Terrell finally met to end the debate about who was the legitimate heavyweight champion. Before the bout, Terrell repeatedly called Ali by his birth name. He said later that he had known "Clay" for years in the amateurs and hadn't gotten used to calling him another name. Publicly, Ali took offense to this, and vowed he would punish Terrell. In a 1979 interview, he said, "They billed the fight on that little grudge thing, and I wasn't really angry - I didn't care what he called me - but this was a good chance to promote my new image."

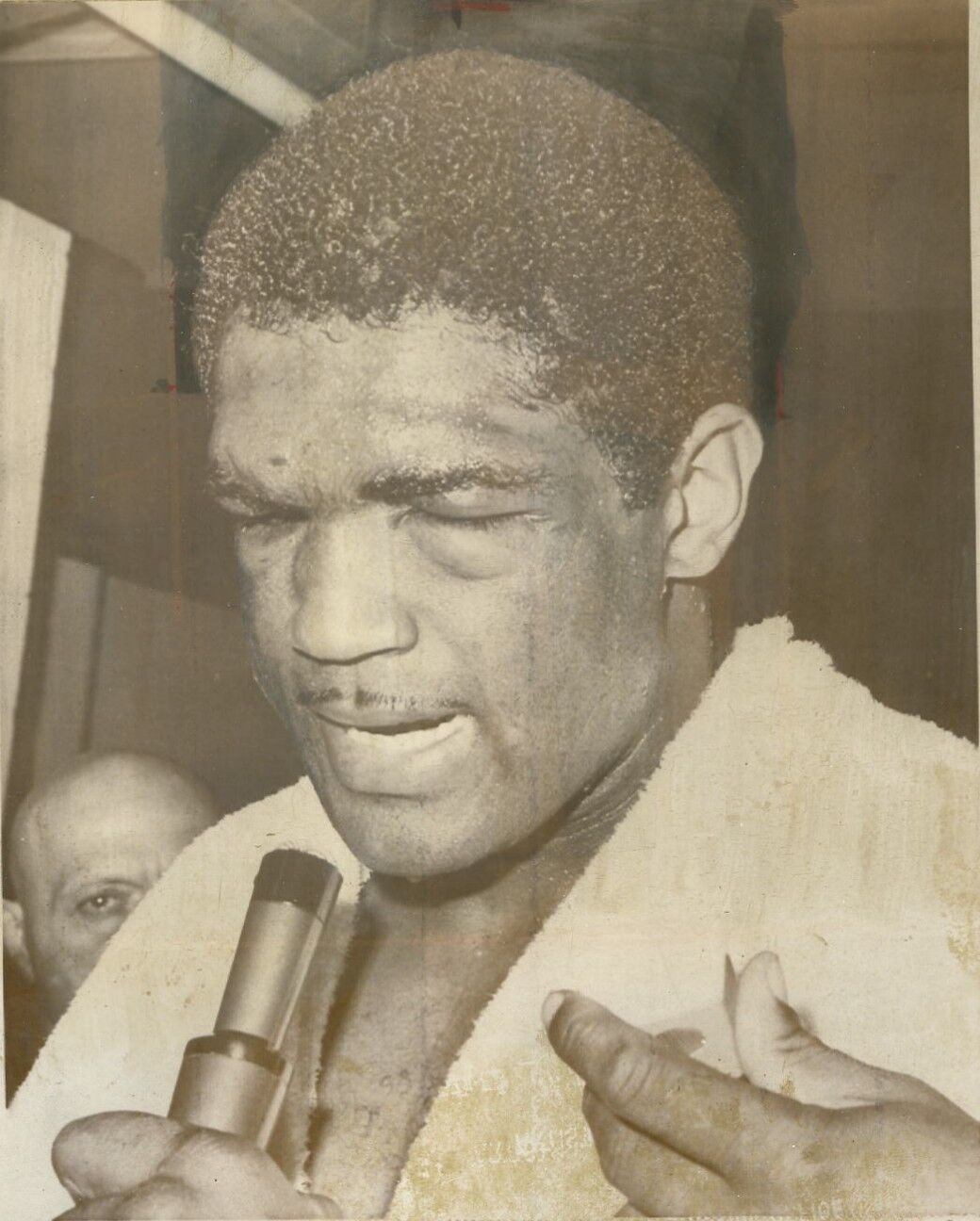
Terrell after the Ali fight

Ali further stoked the prefight ill-will by labeling Terrell "an Uncle Tom nigger who is going to get his ass whupped". Ali won by unanimous decision, reclaiming the undisputed championship. The Daily Telegraph wrote that the resulting fight was "the nastiest display of Ali's celebrated ring career", describing how he seized Terrell in a headlock and dragged Terrell's eye along the top rope, and declared, "The fight will be remembered for Ali's constant taunts of 'what's my name?' to an opponent he was apparently content not merely to defeat, but also to belittle and humiliate." The match is recounted in the film Ali.

Terrell lost an upset 12-round decision to Thad Spencer later in 1967 in the WBA heavyweight tournament that was organized after Ali was stripped of his title in April 1967. He left the sport for three years following the loss, but returned in 1970, winning seven consecutive fights before losing to Chuck Wepner by decision. The Wepner decision was highly controversial; most who saw the fight thought Terrell had won. After losing to Jeff Merritt in his next fight by a 1st-round technical knockout, Terrell retired.

In 55 professional fights, Terrell earned a record of 46 wins (21 by knockout), nine losses and no draws.

== Later life ==
After retiring from boxing he began a career as a record producer in Chicago.

He ran unsuccessfully for alderman of Chicago's 34th ward in 1987, finishing second in the primary although lost to Lemuel Austin in a runoff.

== Death ==
Terrell died at the age of 75 on December 16, 2014, in a hospital at Evergreen Park, Illinois, having been afflicted in his final years with dementia.

He was buried in Mount Hope Cemetery, Chicago.

== Personal life ==
Terrell married Maxine Sibley in 1974; the couple raised two children.

== Professional boxing record ==
| 55 fights | 46 wins | 9 losses |
|---|---|---|
| By knockout | 21 | 2 |
| By decision | 25 | 7 |

| No. | Result | Record | Opponent | Type | Round, time | Date | Location | Notes |
|---|---|---|---|---|---|---|---|---|
| 55 | Loss | 46–9 | Jeff Merritt | TKO | 1 (10), 2:42 | Sep 10, 1973 | Madison Square Garden, New York City, New York, U.S. | |
| 54 | Loss | 46–8 | Chuck Wepner | PTS | 12 | Jun 23, 1973 | Convention Hall, Atlantic City, New Jersey, U.S. | For vacant National Americas heavyweight title |
| 53 | Win | 46–7 | Bill Drover | TKO | 1 (10), 2:28 | Feb 19, 1973 | Spectrum, Philadelphia, Pennsylvania, U.S. | |
| 52 | Win | 45–7 | Jose Luis Garcia | KO | 6 (10) | Oct 23, 1972 | Caracas, Venezuela | |
| 51 | Win | 44–7 | Roberto Davila | UD | 10 | Jul 24, 1971 | Playboy Club, Lake Geneva, Wisconsin, U.S. | |
| 50 | Win | 43–7 | Luis Faustino Pires | UD | 10 | May 10, 1971 | International Amphitheatre, Chicago, Illinois, U.S. | |
| 49 | Win | 42–7 | Vic Brown | UD | 10 | Apr 28, 1971 | Cleveland Arena, Cleveland, Ohio, U.S. | |
| 48 | Win | 41–7 | John Hudgins | TKO | 1 (10), 1:58 | Apr 3, 1971 | Playboy Club, Lake Geneva, Wisconsin, U.S. | |
| 47 | Win | 40–7 | Sonny Moore | UD | 10 | Dec 15, 1970 | The Eagles Club, Milwaukee, Wisconsin, U.S. | |
| 46 | Loss | 39–7 | Manuel Ramos | UD | 10 | Oct 14, 1967 | Estadio Azteca, Mexico City, Mexico | |
| 45 | Loss | 39–6 | Thad Spencer | UD | 12 | Aug 5, 1967 | Astrodome, Houston, Texas, U.S. | |
| 44 | Loss | 39–5 | Muhammad Ali | UD | 15 | Feb 6, 1967 | Astrodome, Houston, Texas, U.S. | Lost WBA heavyweight title For WBC and The Ring heavyweight titles |
| 43 | Win | 39–4 | Doug Jones | UD | 15 | Jun 28, 1966 | Sam Houston Coliseum, Houston, Texas, U.S. | Retained WBA heavyweight title |
| 42 | Win | 38–4 | George Chuvalo | UD | 15 | Nov 1, 1965 | Maple Leaf Gardens, Toronto, Ontario, Canada | Retained WBA heavyweight title |
| 41 | Win | 37–4 | Eddie Machen | UD | 15 | Mar 5, 1965 | International Amphitheatre, Chicago, Illinois, U.S. | Won vacant WBA heavyweight title |
| 40 | Win | 36–4 | Henry Wallitsch | RTD | 6 (10), 0:01 | Oct 23, 1964 | St. Louis, Missouri, U.S. | |
| 39 | Win | 35–4 | Bob Foster | TKO | 7 (10), 0:58 | Jul 10, 1964 | Madison Square Garden, New York City, New York, U.S. | |
| 38 | Win | 34–4 | Jefferson Davis | UD | 10 | Jun 17, 1964 | Municipal Auditorium, Miami Beach, Florida, U.S. | |
| 37 | Win | 33–4 | Gerhard Zech | UD | 10 | Mar 6, 1964 | Madison Square Garden, New York City, New York, U.S. | |
| 36 | Win | 32–4 | Zora Folley | UD | 10 | Jul 27, 1963 | Madison Square Garden, New York City, New York, U.S. | |
| 35 | Win | 31–4 | Cleveland Williams | SD | 10 | Apr 13, 1963 | Philadelphia Arena, Philadelphia, Pennsylvania, U.S. | |
| 34 | Win | 30–4 | Herb Siler | TKO | 3 (10) | Mar 7, 1963 | Little River Auditorium, Miami, Florida, U.S. | |
| 33 | Win | 29–4 | Young Jack Johnson | UD | 10 | Jan 5, 1963 | Madison Square Garden, New York City, New York, U.S. | |
| 32 | Win | 28–4 | Young Jack Johnson | UD | 10 | Dec 14, 1962 | Chicago Coliseum, Chicago, Illinois, U.S. | |
| 31 | Win | 27–4 | Reiniero Rey Lopez | KO | 3, 2:15 | Sep 25, 1962 | Comiskey Park, Chicago, Illinois, U.S. | |
| 30 | Win | 26–4 | Eddie Jackson | TKO | 2 (10), 2:54 | Aug 24, 1962 | Grand Olympic Auditorium, Los Angeles, California, U.S. | |
| 29 | Win | 25–4 | Amos Lincoln | UD | 6 | Jun 9, 1962 | Madison Square Garden, New York City, New York, U.S. | |
| 28 | Loss | 24–4 | Cleveland Williams | TKO | 7 (10), 1:43 | Apr 3, 1962 | Sam Houston Coliseum, Houston, Texas, U.S. | |
| 27 | Win | 24–3 | Herb Siler | PTS | 10 | Feb 28, 1962 | Exhibition Hall, Miami Beach, Florida, U.S. | |
| 26 | Win | 23–3 | Ernie Cab | RTD | 3 (6), 0:01 | Dec 4, 1961 | Convention Hall, Philadelphia, Pennsylvania, U.S. | |
| 25 | Win | 22–3 | Chuck Garrett | UD | 10 | May 15, 1961 | Marigold Gardens, Chicago, Illinois, U.S. | |
| 24 | Win | 21–3 | Willie Coleman | KO | 1 (8) | Apr 17, 1961 | Marigold Gardens, Chicago, Illinois, U.S. | |
| 23 | Win | 20–3 | Ernie Cab | TKO | 8 (10) | Feb 6, 1961 | Marigold Gardens, Chicago, Illinois, U.S. | |
| 22 | Loss | 19–3 | Wayne Bethea | SD | 10 | Dec 5, 1960 | Marigold Gardens, Chicago, Illinois, U.S. | |
| 21 | Win | 19–2 | Joe Hemphill | UD | 8 | Jul 20, 1960 | Chicago Stadium, Chicago, Illinois, U.S. | Won Illinois heavyweight title |
| 20 | Win | 18–2 | Frankie Daniels | KO | 7 (10) | May 18, 1960 | Chicago Stadium, Chicago, Illinois, U.S. | |
| 19 | Win | 17–2 | Lee Williams | UD | 10 | Mar 30, 1960 | Chicago Stadium, Chicago, Illinois, U.S. | |
| 18 | Win | 16–2 | Clay Thomas | KO | 1 (6) | Jan 6, 1960 | Chicago Stadium, Chicago, Illinois, U.S. | |
| 17 | Win | 15–2 | Chuck Garrett | PTS | 6 | Nov 11, 1959 | Chicago Stadium, Chicago, Illinois, U.S. | |
| 16 | Win | 14–2 | Tunney Hunsaker | PTS | 8 | Jul 24, 1959 | Freedom Hall, Louisville, Kentucky, U.S. | |
| 15 | Loss | 13–2 | Johnny Gray | SD | 8 | Feb 25, 1959 | Chicago Stadium, Chicago, Illinois, U.S. | |
| 14 | Win | 13–1 | Willie Coleman | PTS | 8 | Jan 14, 1959 | Chicago Stadium, Chicago, Illinois, U.S. | |
| 13 | Win | 12–1 | Sid Peaks | UD | 8 | Nov 3, 1958 | Joe Louis Gymnasium, Chicago, Illinois, U.S. | |
| 12 | Win | 11–1 | John Hobart | KO | 1 | Oct 7, 1958 | East Chicago, Indiana, U.S. | |
| 11 | Win | 10–1 | Joe Hemphill | TKO | 1 (6) | Sep 24, 1958 | Chicago Stadium, Chicago, Illinois, U.S. | |
| 10 | Win | 9–1 | Billy Pickett | KO | 2 (8) | Jul 1, 1958 | Midwest Gymnasium, Chicago, Illinois, U.S. | |
| 9 | Loss | 8–1 | Johnny Gray | SD | 8 | Apr 30, 1958 | Chicago Stadium, Chicago, Illinois, U.S. | |
| 8 | Win | 8–0 | Johnny Harper | TKO | 1 (8) | Mar 11, 1958 | Midwest Gym, Chicago, Illinois, U.S. | |
| 7 | Win | 7–0 | Emil Brtko | TKO | 2 (8) | Feb 4, 1958 | Joe Louis Gym, Chicago, Illinois, U.S. | |
| 6 | Win | 6–0 | Calvin Butler | SD | 6 | Jan 8, 1958 | Chicago Stadium, Chicago, Illinois, U.S. | |
| 5 | Win | 5–0 | Ted Poole | TKO | 1 (6) | Oct 30, 1957 | Chicago Stadium, Chicago, Illinois, U.S. | |
| 4 | Win | 4–0 | Neal Welch | UD | 6 | Aug 21, 1957 | Chicago Stadium, Chicago, Illinois, U.S. | |
| 3 | Win | 3–0 | Ray Griggs | KO | 1 (4) | Jul 24, 1957 | Chicago Stadium, Chicago, Illinois, U.S. | |
| 2 | Win | 2–0 | Andy Bond | TKO | 1 (4) | Jun 26, 1957 | Chicago Stadium, Chicago, Illinois, U.S. | |
| 1 | Win | 1–0 | Norman Bolden | UD | 4 | May 15, 1957 | Chicago Stadium, Chicago, Illinois, U.S. | |

== Titles in boxing ==
=== Major world titles ===
- WBA heavyweight champion (200+ lbs)

=== Regional/International titles ===
- Illinois heavyweight champion (200+ lbs)

Sporting positions
World boxing titles
| Vacant Title last held by Muhammad Ali stripped | WBA heavyweight champion March 5, 1965 – February 6, 1967 | Succeeded by Muhammad Ali |
