= Bob Baker (boxer) =

American boxer

Personal information
- Nickname: The Grinder
- Nationality: American
- Born: Robert Baker; October 26, 1926 Canonsburg, Pennsylvania, U.S.
- Died: April 23, 2002 (aged 75)
- Weight: Heavyweight

Boxing career
- Stance: Orthodox

Boxing record
- Total fights: 68
- Wins: 51
- Win by KO: 20
- Losses: 16
- Draws: 1

Robert "The Grinder" Baker (October 26, 1926 – April 23, 2002) was a heavyweight boxer whose professional career spanned from 1949 until 1960. Baker was born in Canonsburg, Pennsylvania and originally fought out of Pittsburgh, Pennsylvania.

== Career ==
=== Amateur career ===
In Baker's amateur career he only lost one fight and won the 1949 Intercity Golden Gloves championship in the heavyweight division.

=== Professionals ===
He started his professional career with twenty-six consecutive wins. However, his winning streak came to an end when he was defeated by another leading contender, Clarence Henry, in 1954. In his previous fight, only days before, he drew with bulky Kid Riviera. He also lost to Bob Satterfield, Archie Moore and other contenders during this era. After his defeat to Archie Moore in 1954, he never lost by a knockout again. There was talk of Baker facing heavyweight champion Rocky Marciano in early 1956. However, even though Baker defeated Nino Valdez on December 7, 1955, the championship bout never materialized. The bout against Valdez was a rematch of a bout fought in May 1953 and both were won by Baker by unanimous decisions.

Before losing a split decision to Tommy "Hurricane" Jackson on February 3, 1956, Baker won thirteen straight bouts and was ranked as a top contender for Marciano's heavyweight title. After defeating another leading contender, John Holman, in Miami Beach Auditorium, Florida, on May 9, 1956, he lost a rematch with Jackson on September 26, 1956. Again it was a split decision. A majority of the ringside press felt Baker won, although the Associated Press scored it for Jackson.

After 1957, his fighting skills diminished, although Baker defeated George Chuvalo, a future Canadian champion and multiple world heavyweight title contender in the 1960s and 1970s, by unanimous decision, on September 9, 1957, in Canada.

== Personal life ==
Baker served in the Navy prior to becoming a boxer. He was an only child and had only one child himself, Robert Baker Jr.

After his boxing career, Baker was a foreman for a PennDOT road crew in Penn Hills in the 1980s. He was well regarded for his honesty, humility and fair treatment of his crew. He never spoke of his fame or accomplishments.
