= Athol McQueen =

Australian boxer

Personal information
- Nationality: Australian
- Born: 11 November 1941 (age 83); Kyogle, New South Wales, Australia

Sport
- Sport: Boxing

Athol McQueen (born 11 November 1941) is an Australian boxer. He competed in the men's heavyweight event at the 1964 Summer Olympics. At the 1964 Summer Olympics, he defeated Tadayuki Maruyama of Japan, before losing to Joe Frazier of the United States.

In 1964, heavyweight representative Buster Mathis qualified but was injured, and so Frazier was sent as a replacement. At the heavyweight boxing event, Frazier knocked out George Oywello of Uganda in the round of 16, then knocked out Athol 40 seconds into the quarter-finals. He was the only American boxer left at the semi-final stage, facing the 6'2", 214-lb Vadim Yemelyanov of the Soviet Union.
