= Joe Frazier =

American boxer (1944–2011)

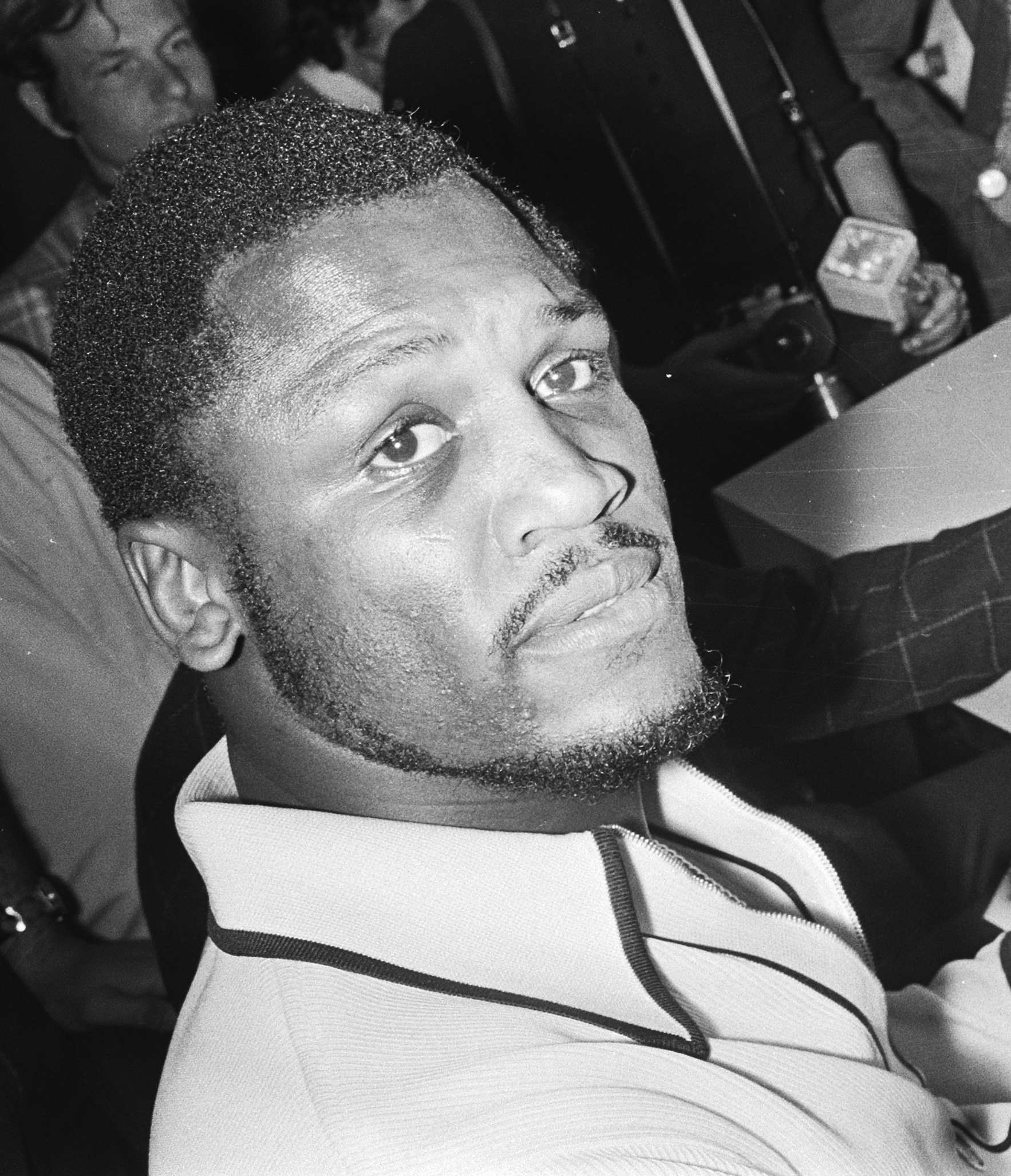
- Frazier in 1971

Personal information
- Nickname: Smokin’ Joe
- Born: Joseph William Frazier; January 12, 1944 Beaufort, South Carolina, U.S.
- Died: November 7, 2011 (aged 67) Philadelphia, Pennsylvania, U.S.
- Resting place: Ivy Hill Cemetery
- Height: 5 ft 11 1/2 in (182 cm)
- Weight: Heavyweight

Boxing career
- Reach: 73 1/2 in (187 cm)
- Stance: Orthodox

Boxing record
- Total fights: 37
- Wins: 32
- Win by KO: 27
- Losses: 4
- Draws: 1
Medal record
Men's amateur boxing
Representing United States
Olympic Games
Gold medal – first place	1964 Tokyo	Heavyweight

Joseph William Frazier (January 12, 1944 – November 7, 2011) was an American professional boxer who competed from 1965 to 1981. Nicknamed "Smokin’ Joe”, he was known for his strength, durability, formidable left hand, and relentless pressure fighting style. He won a gold medal at the 1964 Summer Olympics as an amateur, held the NYSAC heavyweight title from 1968 to 1973, and was the undisputed heavyweight champion from 1970 to 1973. In 1971, Frazier became the first boxer to defeat Muhammad Ali.

Frazier emerged as the top contender in the late 1960s, becoming undisputed heavyweight champion in 1970. In 1971, he defeated Ali by unanimous decision in the highly anticipated Fight of the Century. Two years later, Frazier lost his title to George Foreman. Frazier's last world-title challenge came in 1975, when he was beaten by Ali in a brutal rubber match, the Thrilla in Manila. He retired in 1976 after a second loss to Foreman but made a one-match comeback in 1981, before retiring for good with a record of 32 wins, 4 losses, and 1 draw. The International Boxing Research Organization rates Frazier among the ten greatest heavyweights of all time.

The Ring magazine named him Fighter of the Year in 1967, 1970, and 1971, and the Boxing Writers Association of America (BWAA) named him Fighter of the Year in 1969, 1971, and 1975. In 1999, The Ring ranked him the eighth greatest heavyweight. He is an inductee of both the International Boxing Hall of Fame and the World Boxing Hall of Fame, having been a part of the inaugural induction class of 1990 for the IBHF.

His style was often compared with that of Henry Armstrong and occasionally Rocky Marciano and was dependent on bobbing, weaving, and relentless pressure to wear down his opponents. His best-known punch was a powerful left hook, which accounted for most of his knockouts. In his career, he lost to only two fighters, both former Olympic and world heavyweight champions: twice to Muhammad Ali and twice to George Foreman.

Frazier continued to train fighters in his gym in Philadelphia. His attitude towards Ali in later life was largely characterized by bitterness and contempt but was interspersed with brief reconciliations.

== Early life ==
Frazier was born January 12, 1944, the twelfth child of Dolly Alston-Frazier and Rubin in Beaufort, South Carolina. He was raised in Laurel Bay, South Carolina, a rural community in Beaufort County, South Carolina. Frazier said that he was always close to his father, who carried him when he was a toddler "over the 10 acres of farmland" the Fraziers worked as sharecroppers "to the still where he made his bootleg corn liquor, and into town on Saturdays to buy the necessities that a family of 10 needed." He was affectionately called "Billie Boy".

Rubin Frazier had his left hand and part of his forearm amputated in a tractor accident the year that his son was born. Rubin Frazier and his wife, Dolly, had been in their car when their friend Arthur Smith, who was drunk, made a move for Dolly, but was rebuffed. Stefan Gallucci, a local barkeep, recounted the experience. When the Fraziers drove away, Smith fired at them several times and hit Dolly in the foot and Rubin several times in his arm. Smith was convicted and sent to prison but did not stay long. Dolly said, "If you were a good workman, the white man took you out of jail and kept you busy on the farm."

Frazier's parents worked their farm with two mules: Buck and Jenny. The farmland was what country people called "white dirt, which is another way of saying it isn't worth a damn." They could not grow peas or corn on it, only cotton and watermelons.

=== Introduction to boxing ===
In the early 1950s, Frazier's father bought a black and white television, and the family and others nearby came to watch boxing matches on it. Frazier's mother sold drinks for a quarter as they watched boxers like Sugar Ray Robinson, Rocky Marciano, Willie Pep, and Rocky Graziano. One night, Frazier's uncle, Israel, noticed his stocky build. "That boy there... that boy is gonna be another Joe Louis", he remarked. The words made an impression on Joe. His classmates at school would give him a sandwich or a quarter to walk with them at final bell so that bullies would not bother them. Frazier said, "Any 'scamboogah' [disrespectful, low-down and foul person] who got in my face would soon regret it; Billie Boy could kick anybody's ass." The day after his uncle's comment, Frazier filled an old burlap sack with rags, corncobs, a brick, and Spanish moss. He hung the makeshift heavybag from an oak tree in the backyard. "For the next 6, 7 years, damn near every day I'd hit that heavybag for an hour at a time. I'd wrap my hands with a necktie of my Daddy's, or a stocking of my Momma's or sister's, and get to it," he remarked.

=== Early work ===
Not long after Frazier started working, his left arm was seriously injured while he was running from the family's 300-pound hog. One day, Frazier poked the hog with a stick and ran away. The gate to the pigpen was open, however, and the hog chased him. Frazier fell and hit his left arm on a brick. His arm was torn badly, but as the family could not afford a doctor, the arm had to heal on its own. He was never able to keep it fully straight again.

When Frazier was 15 years old, he had been working on a farm for a family named Bellamy. They were both white men: Mac was younger and more easy-going, and Jim was rougher and somewhat backward. One day, a black kid about 12 years old accidentally damaged one of the Bellamys' tractors. Jim became so enraged he took off his belt and whipped the boy with his belt right there in the field. Frazier saw the event and went back to the packing house on the farm and told his black friends what he had seen. Soon, Jim saw Frazier and asked him why he told others what he had witnessed. Joe then told Bellamy he did not know what he was talking about. But Jim did not believe Frazier, and he told Frazier to get off the farm before he took off his belt again. Frazier told him to keep his pants up because he was not going to use his belt on him. Jim then analyzed Frazier for a bit and eventually said, "Go on, get the hell outta here." Joe knew from that moment it was time for him to leave Beaufort, and he could see only hard times and low rent for himself. Even his mother could see it. She told Frazier, "Son, if you can't get along with the white folks, then leave home because I don't want anything to happen to you."

The train fare from Beaufort to the cities up north was costly, and the closest bus stop was in Charleston, 75 miles (121 km) away. In 1958, a Greyhound Lines bus called "The Dog" by locals in Beaufort, made Beaufort a stop on its South Carolina route. Frazier had a brother, Tommy, in New York, and was told that he could stay with Tommy and his family. Frazier had to save up a bit before he could make the bus trip to New York and still have some money in his pocket, so he first went to work at the local Coca-Cola plant. Frazier recalled that the white guy would drive the truck and that he would do the real work stacking and unloading the crates. He worked with Coca-Cola until the government began building houses for the Marines stationed at Parris Island, when he was hired on a work crew at Parris Island.

=== Departure for Philadelphia ===
Nine months eventually passed since he got the boot from the Bellamy farm. With no fanfare and no tearful goodbyes, Frazier packed quickly and got the first bus heading north, where he settled in Philadelphia. "I climbed on the Dog's back and rode through the night. It was 1959; I was 15 years old and I was on my own," he later said.

== Career ==
=== Amateur boxing ===
During Frazier's amateur career, he won Golden Gloves heavyweight championships in 1962, 1963, and 1964. His only loss in three years as an amateur was to Buster Mathis. Mathis would prove to be Joe's biggest obstacle to making the 1964 U.S. Olympic boxing team. They met in the final of the U.S. Olympic trials at the New York World's Fair in the summer of 1964. Their fight was scheduled for three rounds and they fought with 10-oz gloves and with headgear, but the boxers who made it to Tokyo would wear no headgear and would wear 8-oz gloves. Frazier was eager to get back at Mathis for his only amateur loss and knocked out two opponents to get to the finals. However, once again when the dust settled, the judges had called it for Mathis, undeservedly Joe thought. "All that fat boy had done was run like a thief- hit me with a peck and backpedal like crazy," he would remark.

Mathis had worn his trunks very high so that when Frazier hit Mathis with legitimate body shots, the referee took a dim view of them. In the second round, the referee had gone so far as to penalize Joe two points for hitting below the belt. "In a three-round bout a man can't afford a points deduction like that," Frazier said. He then returned to Philadelphia and felt as low as he had ever been and even thought of giving up boxing. Duke Dugent and his trainer, Yank Durham, were able to talk him out of his doldrums and even suggested that Frazier make the trip to Tokyo as an alternate in case something happened to Mathis. Frazier agreed and was a workhorse there, sparring with any of the Olympic boxers who wanted some action. "Middleweight, light heavyweight, it didn't matter to me, I got in there and boxed all comers," he said. In contrast, Mathis was slacking off. In the morning, when the Olympic team would do their roadwork, Mathis would run a mile and start walking and say, "Go ahead, big Joe. I'll catch up."

Frazier's amateur record was 38–2.

=== 1964 Summer Olympics ===
In 1964, heavyweight representative Buster Mathis qualified but was injured, and so Frazier was sent as a replacement. At the heavyweight boxing event, 20-year-old Frazier knocked out George Oywello of Uganda in the round of 16, then knocked out Athol McQueen of Australia 40 seconds into the quarter-finals. He was the only American boxer left at the semi-final stage, facing the 6'2", 214-lb Vadim Yemelyanov of the Soviet Union.

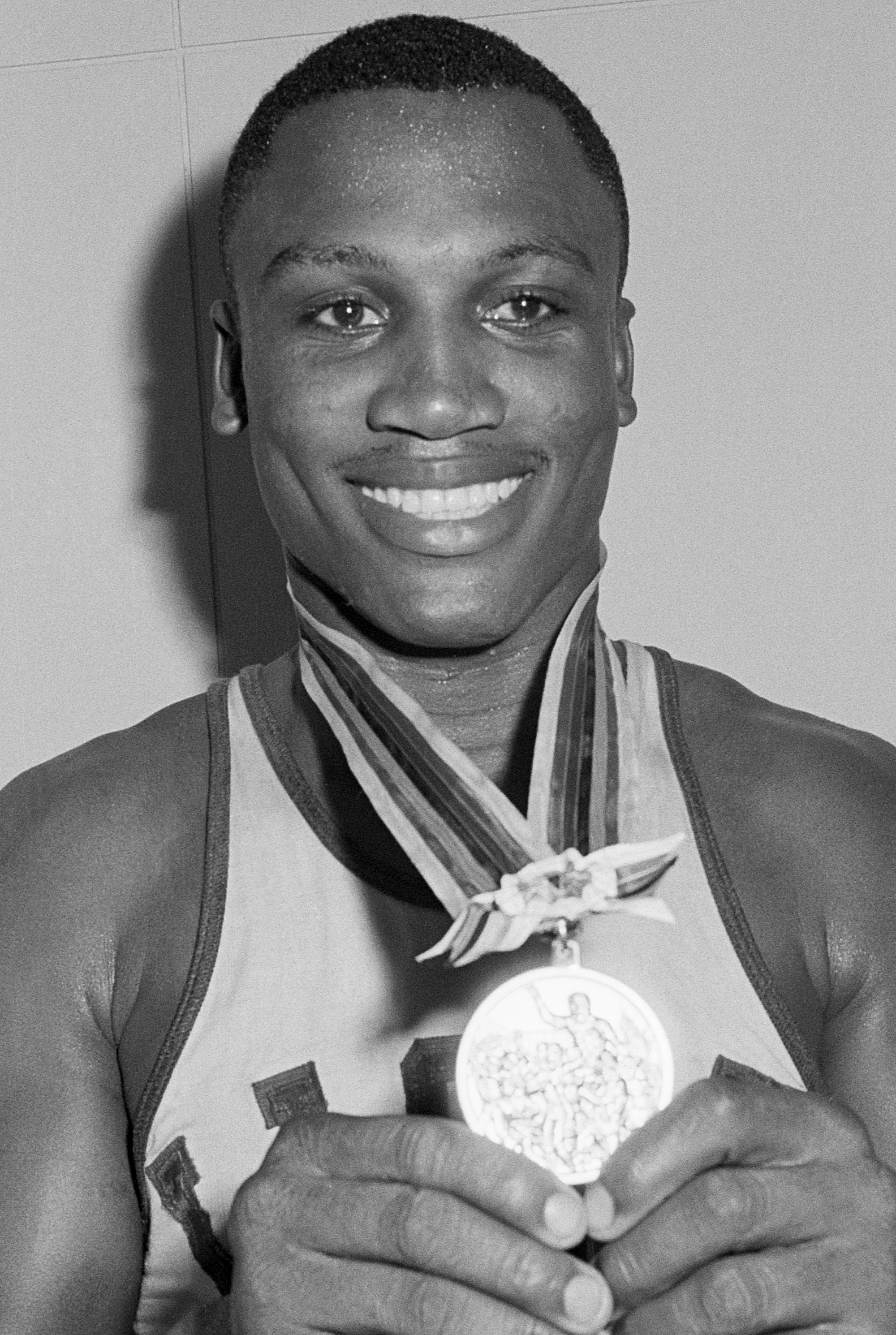
Frazier holding the 1964 Summer Olympics gold medal

"My left hook was a heat-seeking missile, careening off his face and body time and again. Twice in the second round I knocked him to the canvas. But as I pounded away, I felt a jolt of pain shoot through my left arm. Oh damn, the thumb," Frazier said. He knew immediately the thumb of his left hand was damaged, but he was unsure as to the extent. "In the midst of the fight, with your adrenaline pumping, it's hard to gauge such things. My mind was on more important matters. Like how I was going to deal with Yemelyanov for the rest of the fight." The match ended when the Soviet's handlers threw in the towel at 1:49 in the second round, and the referee raised Frazier's injured hand in victory.

Now that Frazier was into the final, he mentioned his broken thumb to no one. He went back to his room and soaked his thumb in hot water and Epsom salts. "Pain or not, Joe Frazier of Beaufort, South Carolina, was going for gold," he proclaimed. He went on to fight German Hans Huber, eight years his senior. Frazier was now used to fighting bigger guys, but not with a damaged left hand. When the opening bell sounded on fight night, Joe came out, started swinging punches, and threw his right hand more than usual that night. Every so often, he would use his left hook, but nothing landed with the kind of impact that he had managed in previous bouts. He won a 3–2 decision.

=== Professional career ===
After Frazier won the only American 1964 Olympic boxing gold medal, his trainer Yancey "Yank" Durham helped put together Cloverlay, a group of local businessmen (including a young Larry Merchant) who invested in Frazier's professional career and allowed him to train full time. Durham was Frazier's chief trainer and manager until Durham's death in August 1973.

Frazier turned professional in 1965 by defeating Woody Goss by a technical knockout in the first round. He won three more fights that year, all by knockout and none going past the third round. Later that year, he was in a training accident that left him legally blind in his left eye. During pre-fight physicals, after reading the eye chart with his right eye, when prompted to cover his other eye, Frazier switched hands but covered his left eye for a second time, and state athletic commission physicians seemed not to notice or act.

Frazier's second contest was of interest in that he was decked by Mike Bruce. Frazier took an "8" count by referee Bob Polis but rallied for a TKO over Bruce in the third round.

In 1966, as Frazier's career was taking off, Durham contacted Los Angeles trainer Eddie Futch. The two men had never met, but Durham had heard of Futch, who had a reputation as one of the most respected trainers in boxing. Frazier was sent to Los Angeles to train before Futch agreed to join Durham as an assistant trainer. With Futch's assistance, Durham arranged three fights in Los Angeles against journeyman Al Jones, veteran contender Eddie Machen and George "Scrap Iron" Johnson. Frazier knocked out Jones and Machen but surprisingly went through 10 rounds with Scrap Iron Johnson to win a unanimous decision. Johnson had apparently bet all his purse that he would survive to the final bell, noted Ring Magazine, and he somehow achieved it. However Johnson was known in the trade as "impossibly durable".

After the Johnson match, Futch became a full-fledged member of the Frazier camp as an assistant trainer and strategist, who advised Durham on matchmaking. It was Futch who suggested that Frazier boycott the 1967 WBA Heavyweight Elimination Tournament to find a successor to Muhammad Ali after the Heavyweight Champion was stripped of his title for refusing to be inducted into the military, although Frazier was the top-ranked contender at the time.

Futch proved invaluable to Frazier as an assistant trainer and helped modify his style. Under Futch's tutelage, Frazier adopted the bob-and-weave defensive style by making him more difficult for taller opponents to punch and giving Frazier more power with his own punches. Futch remained based in Los Angeles, where he worked as a supervisor with the US Postal Service, and flew to Philadelphia to work with Frazier during the final preparations for all of his fights.

After Durham died of a stroke on August 30, 1973, Futch was asked to succeed him as Frazier's head trainer and manager. He was training the heavyweight contender Ken Norton, who lost a rematch against Ali less than two weeks before Durham's death. Then, Norton's managers, Robert Biron and Aaron Rivkind, demanded that Futch choose to train either Frazier or Norton, with Futch choosing Frazier.

==== Mid-to-late 1960s ====
Now in his second year, in September 1966 and somewhat green, Frazier won a close decision over rugged contender Oscar Bonavena, despite Bonavena flooring him twice in the second round. A third knockdown in that round would have ended the fight under the three knockdown rule. Frazier rallied and won a close split decision after 10 rounds. The Machen win followed that contest.

In 1967, Frazier stormed ahead winning all six of his fights, including a sixth-round knockout of Doug Jones and a brutal fourth round (TKO) of Canadian George Chuvalo. No boxer had ever stopped Chuvalo, but Frazier, despite the stoppage, was unable to floor Chuvalo, who would never be knocked down in his entire career despite fighting numerous top names.

By February 1967, Joe had scored 14 wins and his star was beginning to rise. This culminated with his first appearance on the cover of Ring Magazine. That month, he met Ali, who had not yet been stripped of his title. Ali said that Joe would never stand a chance of "whipping" him even in his wildest dreams. Later that year, Muhammad Ali was stripped of his world heavyweight title because of his refusal to accept the military draft during the Vietnam War.

To fill the vacancy, the New York State Athletic Commission held a bout between Frazier and Buster Mathis, who were undefeated going into the match, with the winner to be recognized as "World Champion" by New York State. Although the fight was not recognized as a World Championship bout by some, Frazier won by a knockout in the 11th round and staked a claim to the Heavyweight Championship.

==== Laying claims ====
Frazier first defended his claim by beating hard-hitting prospect Manuel Ramos of Mexico. His victory came in only two rounds.

He closed 1968 by again beating Oscar Bonavena via a 15-round decision in a hard-fought rematch. Bonavena fought somewhat defensively and allowed himself to be often bulled to the ropes, which let Frazier build a wide points margin. Ring Magazine showed Bonavena afterwards with a gruesomely bruised face. It had been a punishing match.

In 1969, Frazier defended his NYSAC title in Texas and beat Dave Zyglewicz, who had lost only once in 29 fights, by a first-round knockout. Then, he beat Jerry Quarry in a seventh-round stoppage. The match with Quarry was named Ring Magazine fight of the year in 1969. Frazier showed he could do a lot more than just slug by using his newly honed defensive skills to slip, bob, and weave a barrage of punches from Quarry despite Quarry's reputation as an excellent counter-punching heavyweight.

==== World Championship win ====
On February 16, 1970, Frazier faced WBA Champion Jimmy Ellis at Madison Square Garden. Ellis had outpointed Jerry Quarry in the final bout of the WBA elimination tournament for Ali's vacated belt. Frazier had declined to participate in the WBA tournament to protest their decision to strip Ali. Ellis held impressive wins over Oscar Bonavena and Leotis Martin, among others. Beforehand, Ali had announced his retirement and relinquished the Heavyweight title, allowing Ellis and Frazier to fight for the undisputed title, but both lacked any lineal claim. Frazier won by a technical knockout when Ellis's trainer Angelo Dundee would not let him come out for the fifth round following two fourth-round knockdowns, the first knockdowns of Ellis's career. Frazier's decisive win over Ellis was a frightening display of power and tenacity.

In his first title defense, Frazier traveled to Detroit to fight World Light Heavyweight Champion Bob Foster, who would go on to set a record for the number of title defenses in the light-heavyweight division. Frazier (26–0) retained his title by twice flooring the hard-punching Foster in the second round. The second knockdown was delivered by a devastating left hook, and Foster could not beat the count. Then came what was hyped as the "Fight of the Century", his first fight with Muhammad Ali, who had launched a comeback in 1970 after a three-year suspension from boxing. It would be the first meeting of two undefeated heavyweight champions (and the last until Mike Tyson faced Michael Spinks in 1988) since Ali (31–0) had not lost his title in the ring but been stripped because of his refusal to be conscripted into the armed forces. Some considered him to be the true champion, and the fight would crown the one true heavyweight champion.

==== Fight of the Century: first fight versus Ali ====
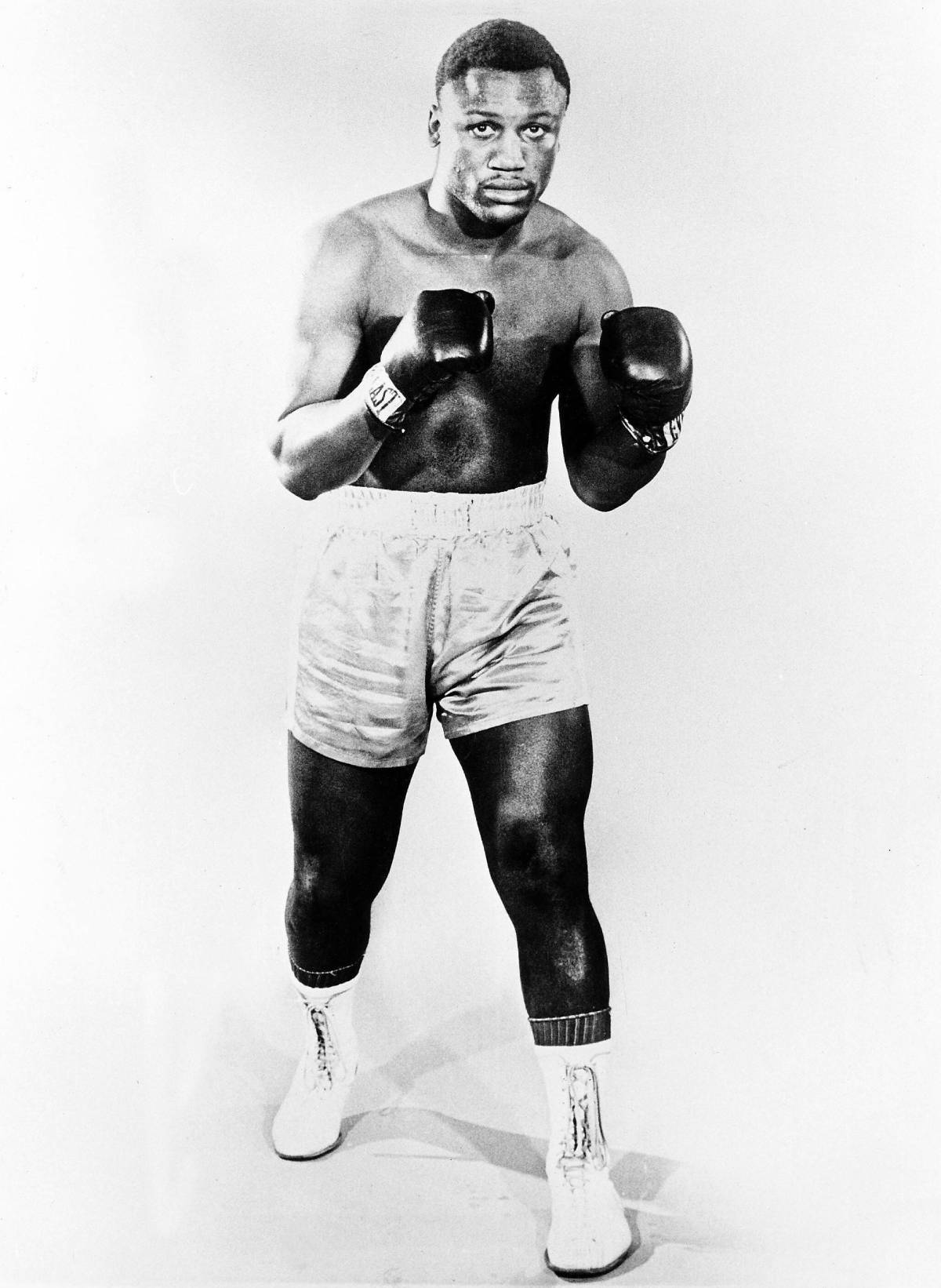
Joe Frazier in a studio portrait. Photo at least dated to 1971 based on this poster

On March 8, 1971, at Madison Square Garden, Frazier and Ali met in the first of their three bouts which was called the "Fight of the Century". With an international television audience and an in-house audience that included singers and actors and with Burt Lancaster (who served as "color commentator" with the fight announcer, Don Dunphy), both undefeated heavyweights met in a media-frenzied atmosphere.

Several factors came together for Frazier in the fight. He was 27 and mentally and physically at his peak. Ali was 29 and coming back from a three-year absence. He had had two good wins in his comeback, including a bruising, fifteen-round technical knockout win over Oscar Bonavena.

Frazier and Futch noticed Ali's tendency to throw a right-hand uppercut from a straight standing position after dropping the hand in preparation to throw it with force. Futch instructed Frazier to watch Ali's right hand and, once Ali dropped it, to throw a left hook at the spot that they knew Ali's face would be a second later.

In a brutal and competitive contest, Frazier lost the first two rounds but was able to withstand Ali's combinations. Frazier was known to improve in middle rounds, which was the case with Ali. Frazier came on strong after the third round by landing hard shots to the body and powerful left hooks to the head. Frazier won a 15-round unanimous decision, with scores of 9–6, 11–4, 8–6–1, and claimed the lineal title. Ali was taken to a hospital immediately after the fight to check that his severely-swollen right-side jaw was not actually broken. Frazier also spent time in hospital during the ensuing month, the exertions of the fight having been exacerbated by hypertension and a kidney infection.

Later that year, he fought a three-round exhibition against hard-hitting veteran contender Cleveland Williams. In 1972, Frazier successfully defended the title twice by knocking out Terry Daniels and Ron Stander in the fourth and fifth rounds, respectively. Daniels had earlier drawn with Jerry Quarry and Stander had knocked out Earnie Shavers.

==== Title loss to George Foreman ====
Frazier lost his undefeated record of 29–0 and his world championship, at the hands of the unbeaten George Foreman on January 22, 1973, in Kingston, Jamaica. Despite Frazier being the overall favorite, Foreman towered 10 cm (4 in.) over the more compact champion along with an 8 in. reach advantage and dominated from the start. Over the course of two rounds, Foreman managed to knock Frazier down six times en route to a technical knockout victory.

Frazier won his next fight, a 12-round decision over Joe Bugner, in London to begin his quest to regain the title.

==== Mid-1970s: second fight against Ali ====
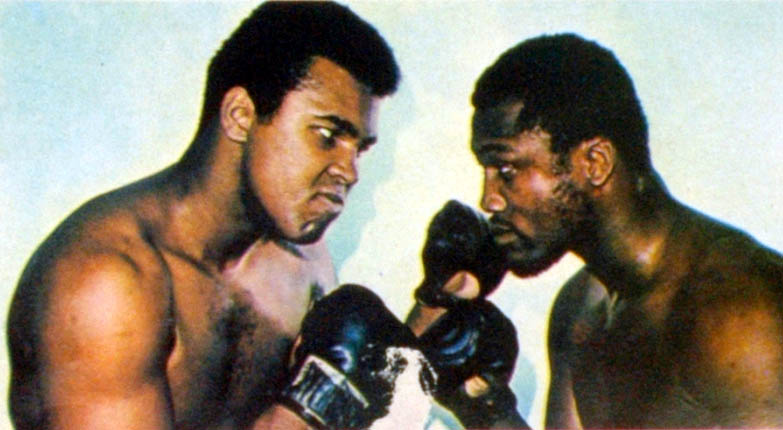
Promotional photo for the January 1974 Muhammad Ali vs. Joe Frazier II fight at Madison Square Garden

Frazier's second fight against Ali took place on January 28, 1974, in New York City. In contrast to their previous meeting, the bout was a non-title fight, with Ali winning a 12-round unanimous decision. The fight was notable for the amount of clinching. After the fight Tony Perez, when asked about the violation from Ali, he replied that the only violation is if you hold and hit at the same time, although Ali was holding Frazier but he was not hitting.

Five months later, Frazier again battled Jerry Quarry in Madison Square Garden by winning the fight in the fifth round with a strong left hook to the ribs.

In March 1975, Frazier fought a rematch with Jimmy Ellis in Melbourne, Australia, and knocked him out in nine rounds. The win again established Frazier as the top heavyweight challenger for the title, which Ali had won from Foreman in the famous "Rumble in the Jungle" five months earlier.

==== Thrilla in Manila: third Ali fight ====
Muhammad Ali and Frazier met for the third and final time in Cubao, Quezon City, which is a city within Metro Manila, the Philippines, on October 1, 1975. Prior to the fight, Ali took opportunities to mock Frazier by calling him a '"gorilla" and generally trying to irritate him.

The fight was a punishing display on both sides under oppressively-hot conditions. During the fight, Ali said to Frazier, "They said you were through, Joe." Frazier said, "They lied." Ali repeatedly held Frazier around the back of his neck with his right hand, a violation of the rules that went unpunished by the referee. After 14 grueling rounds, Ali returned to his corner demanding they cut his gloves and end the bout. However, Dundee ignored Ali. This proved fortuitous, as across the ring, Futch stopped the fight out of concern for his charge. Frazier had a closed left eye, an almost-closed right eye, and a cut. Ali later said that it was the "closest thing to dying that I know of."

In 1977, Ali told interviewer Reg Gutteridge that he felt this third Frazier fight was his best performance. When Gutteridge suggested his win over Cleveland Williams, Ali said, "No, Frazier's much tougher and rougher than Cleveland Williams."

==== Second fight with Foreman ====
In 1976, Frazier (32–3) fought George Foreman for a second time, shaving his head for the fight. Frazier was more restrained than usual and avoided walking into big shots like he had done in their first match. However, Foreman lobbed a tremendous left hook that lifted Frazier off his feet. After a second knockdown, the fight was stopped in the fifth round. Shortly after the fight, Frazier announced his retirement.

Frazier made a cameo appearance in the movie Rocky later in 1976 and dedicated himself to training local boxers in Philadelphia, where he grew up, including some of his own children. He also helped train Duane Bobick.

==== 1980s comeback and career as trainer ====
In 1981, Frazier attempted a comeback. He drew over 10 rounds with hulking Floyd "Jumbo" Cummings in Chicago, Illinois. It was a bruising battle with mixed reviews. He then retired for good.

Then, Frazier involved himself in various endeavors. Among his sons who turned to boxing as a career, Frazier helped train Marvis Frazier, a challenger for Larry Holmes's world heavyweight title. He also trained his daughter, Jacqui Frazier-Lyde, who became a WIBA world light-heavyweight champion whose most notable fight was a close majority decision points loss against Laila Ali, the daughter of his rival.

Frazier's overall record was 32 wins, 4 losses, and 1 draw, with 27 wins by knockout. He won 73% of his fights by knockout, compared to 60% for Ali and 84% for Foreman. He was a member of the International Boxing Hall Of Fame.

In 1984, Frazier was the special referee for the NWA World Heavyweight Championship match between Ric Flair and Dusty Rhodes at Starrcade '84. He awarded the match to Flair because of Rhodes's excessive bleeding.

In 1986, Frazier appeared as the "cornerman" for Mr. T against Roddy Piper at Nassau Veterans Memorial Coliseum as part of WrestleMania 2. In 1989, Frazier joined Ali, Foreman, Norton, and Holmes for the tribute special Champions Forever.

Frazier was inducted into the Madison Square Garden Walk of Fame in 1996.

== Fighting style ==
Frazier's style was dependent on bobbing, weaving, and relentless pressure to wear down his opponents. His best-known punch was a powerful left hook, which accounted for most of his knockouts. Frazier was able to seamlessly transition between different guards, but often used crab style guards both on the outside and inside. Although Frazier was feared for his left hook, towards the end of his career he effectively incorporated his right hand to fool his opponents who were anticipating his left hook.

== Other work ==
=== Media appearances ===
Frazier appeared as himself in an episode of The Simpsons', "Brother, Can You Spare Two Dimes?", in 1992, in which he was supposed to have been beaten up by Barney Gumble in Moe's Tavern. Frazier's son objected, so Frazier was instead shown beating up Gumble and putting him in a trash can. Frazier appeared in another episode of The Simpsons – "Homer's Paternity Coot" in 2006. He appeared on-screen in the 8th series of The Celebrity Apprentice (USA) television show as a guest-attendee at a Silent Auction event held for the season finale (won by Joan Rivers). Frazier appeared as himself in the Academy Award-winning 1976 movie, Rocky. Since the debut of the Fight Night series of games made by EA Sports, Frazier appeared in Fight Night 2004, Fight Night Round 2, Fight Night Round 3, Fight Night Round 4, and Fight Night Champion.

=== Books ===
Frazier released his autobiography in March 1996, entitled Smokin' Joe: The Autobiography of a Heavyweight Champion of the World, Smokin' Joe Frazier. Frazier promoted the book with a memorable appearance on The Howard Stern Show on January 23, 1996.

He also wrote Box like the Pros, "a complete introduction to the sport, including the game's history, rules of the ring, how fights are scored, how to spar, the basics of defence and offence, the fighter's workout, a directory of boxing gyms, and much more. Box Like the Pros is an instruction manual, a historical reference tool and an insider's guide to the world's most controversial sport."

== Financial issues and legal battles ==
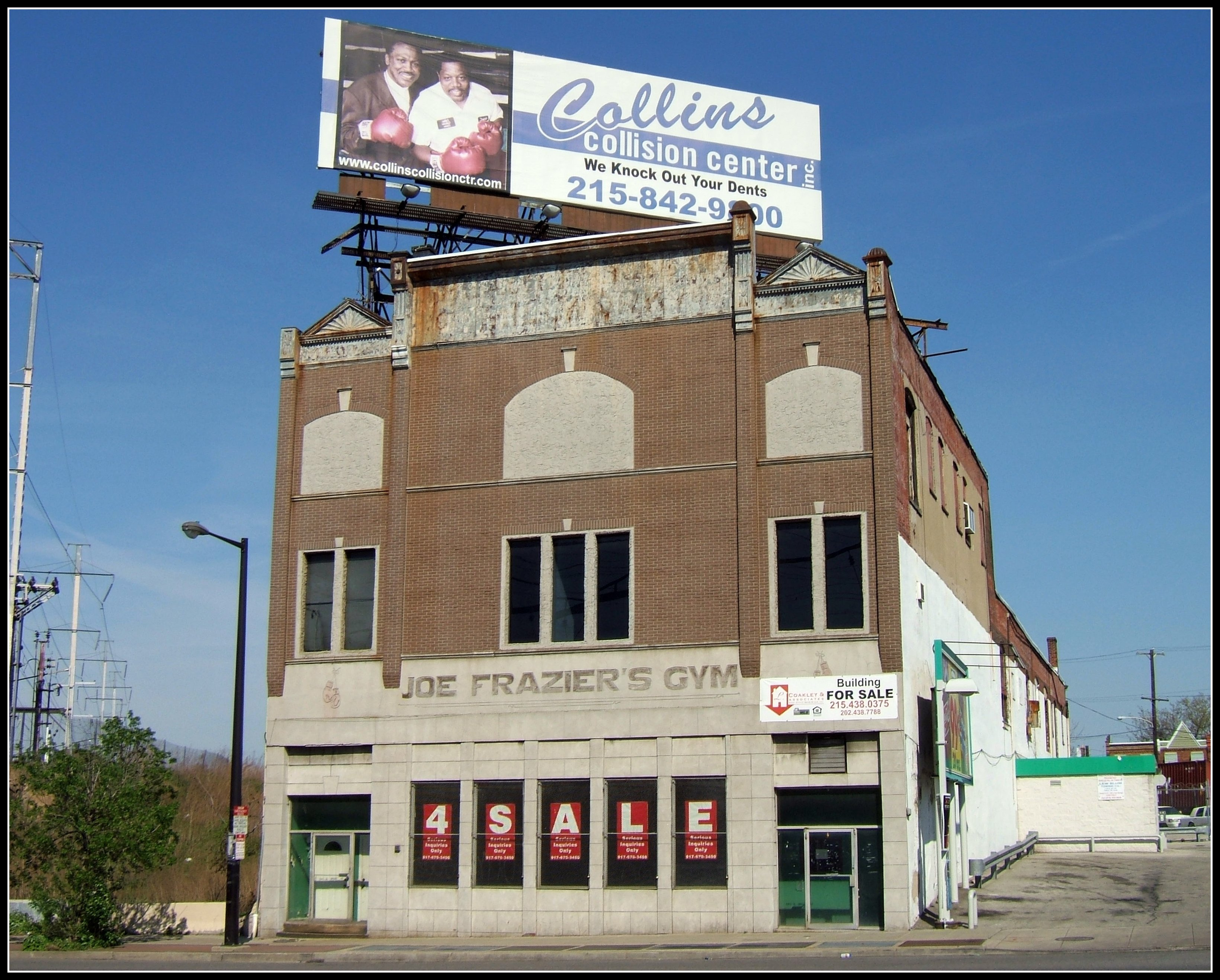
Joe Frazier's Gym, where Frazier trained and lived, at 2917 N. Broad Street in Philadelphia

According to an article from The New York Times, "over the years, Frazier has lost a fortune through a combination of his own generosity and naïveté, his carousing, and failed business opportunities. The other headliners from his fighting days—Ali, George Foreman, and Larry Holmes—are millionaires." Asked about his situation, Frazier became playfully defensive, but would not reveal his financial status. "Are you asking me how much money I have?" he said. "I got plenty of money. I got a stack of $100 bills rolled up over there in the back of the room." Frazier blamed himself, partly, for not effectively promoting his own image. In a 2006 HBO documentary on the fight in Manila, Frazier was interviewed living in his one-room apartment on the second floor of his gym in Philadelphia. Frazier also traveled the country with his marketing manager, Mercedes Ganon, filming an independent documentary, and researching for a feature film on Frazier, which Penny Marshall was attached to direct and produce.

His daughter Jacqui Frazier-Lyde is a lawyer and worked on her father's behalf in pursuit of money they claimed he was owed in a Pennsylvania land deal. In 1973, Frazier purchased 140 acres in Bucks County, Pennsylvania, for $843,000. Five years later, a developer agreed to buy the farmland for $1.8 million. Frazier received annual payments from a trust that bought the land with money he had earned in the ring. However, when the trust went bankrupt, the payments ceased.

Frazier sued his business partners, insisting his signature had been forged on documents and he had no knowledge of the sale. In the ensuing years, the 140 acres was subdivided into a residential community. The land was estimated to be worth $100 million in 2011.

== Relationship with Muhammad Ali ==
Frazier and Ali were initially friends. During Ali's enforced three-year lay-off from boxing for refusing to be drafted into the U.S. Army, Frazier lent him money, testified before Congress and petitioned US President Richard Nixon to have Ali's right to box reinstated. Frazier supported Ali's right not to serve in the army: "If Baptists weren't allowed to fight, I wouldn't fight either."

However, in the build-up to their first fight, the Fight of the Century, Ali turned it into a "cultural and political referendum" by painting himself as a revolutionary and civil rights champion and Frazier as the white man's hope. Ali, angry that Frazier would only refer to him by his birth name, Cassius Clay, called Frazier an "Uncle Tom" and a pawn of the white establishment. Ali successfully turned many black Americans against Frazier because Frazier never spoke out about race issues, and Ali could easily paint himself as hero to oppressed black people. Bryant Gumbel joined the pro-Ali anti-Frazier bandwagon by writing a major magazine article that asked, "Is Joe Frazier a white champion with black skin?" Frazier thought that was "a cynical attempt by Clay to make me feel isolated from my own people. He thought that would weaken me when it came time to face him in that ring. Well, he was wrong. It didn't weaken me, it awakened me to what a cheap-shot son of a bitch he was." Ali's camp also hurled many insults at Frazier, calling him an "ugly gorilla", though Ali had also compared other opponents to animals. He noted the hypocrisy of Ali calling him an Uncle Tom when his [Ali's] trainer (Angelo Dundee) was of Italian descent. When told by Michael Parkinson that Frazier was not an Uncle Tom, he responded by saying, "Then why does he insist on calling me Cassius Clay when even the worst of the white enemies recognize me as Muhammad Ali?"

As a result of Ali's campaign, Frazier's children were bullied at school, and his family was given police protection after receiving death threats. Ali declared that if Frazier won, he would crawl across the ring and admit that Frazier was the greatest. After Frazier won by a unanimous decision, he called upon Ali to fulfill his promise and crawl across the ring, but Ali failed to do so. Ali called it a "white man's decision" and insisted that he won.

During a televised joint interview prior to their second bout in 1974, Ali continued to insult Frazier, who took exception to Ali calling him "ignorant" and challenged him to a fight, which resulted in both of them brawling on the studio floor. Ali went on to win the 12-round non-title affair by a decision. Ali took things further in the build-up to their last fight, the Thrilla in Manila, and called Frazier "the other type of negro" and "ugly", "dumb", and a "gorilla" At one point he sparred with a man in a gorilla suit and pounded on a rubber gorilla doll, saying "This is Joe Frazier's conscience.... I keep it everywhere I go. This is the way he looks when you hit him." According to the fight's promoter, Don King, that enraged Frazier, who took it as a "character assassination" and "personal invective." One night before the fight, Ali waved around a toy pistol outside Frazier's hotel room. When Frazier came to the balcony, he pointed the gun at Frazier and yelled, "I am going to shoot you." After the fight, Ali summoned Frazier's son Marvis into his dressing room, and told him that he had not meant what he had said about his father. When informed by Marvis, Frazier responded, "You ain't me, son. Why isn't he apologizing to me?"

In his 1996 autobiography Smokin' Joe: The Autobiography of a Heavyweight Champion of the World, Frazier consistently refers to Muhammad Ali as "Cassius Clay" and never deviates from that convention unless the book directly quotes someone else.

For years afterwards, Frazier retained his bitterness towards Ali and suggested that Ali's battle with Parkinson's syndrome was a form of divine retribution for his earlier behavior. In 2001, Ali apologized to Frazier via a New York Times article: "In a way, Joe's right. I said a lot of things in the heat of the moment that I shouldn't have said. Called him names I shouldn't have called him. I apologize for that. I'm sorry. It was all meant to promote the fight." Frazier reportedly "embraced it" but later retorted that Ali apologized only to a newspaper, not to him. He said, "I'm still waiting [for him] to say it to me." Ali responded, "If you see Frazier, you tell him he's still a gorilla." Ali also said in an interview, "I wasn't going to get on my knees and crawl and beg him to forgive me."

Frazier told Sports Illustrated in May 2009 that he no longer held hard feelings for Ali. After Frazier's death in November 2011, Ali was among those who attended the private funeral services for Frazier in Philadelphia. Jesse Jackson, who spoke during the service, asked those in attendance to stand and "show your love" and reportedly Ali stood with the audience and clapped "vigorously".

== Later life ==
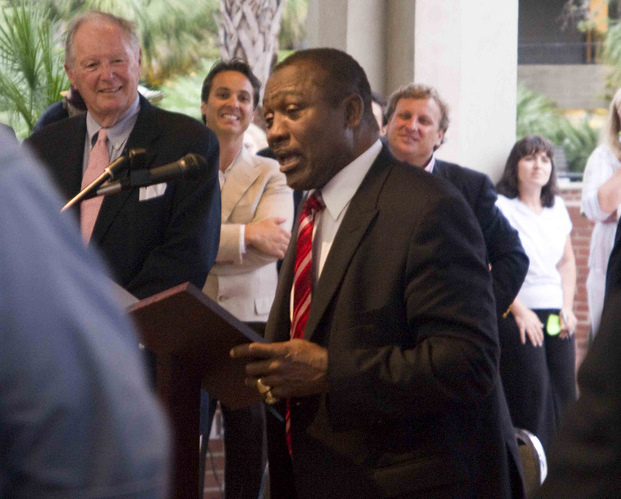
Frazier's speech when he was awarded the Order of the Palmetto in Beaufort, South Carolina, in September 2010

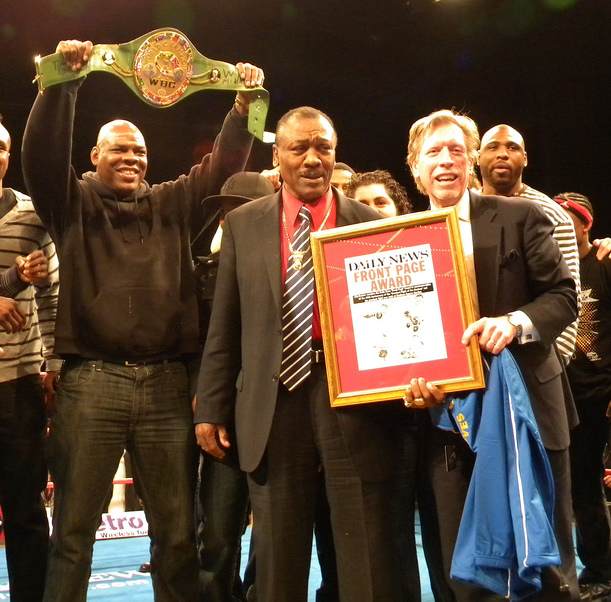
New York Daily News editor-in-chief Kevin Convey (right) presented Frazier with the New York Daily News Front Page Award in 2011.

Frazier lived and trained at 2917 N. Broad Street in Philadelphia, where he owned and managed Joe Frazier's Gym. With the help of Peter Bouchard, Frazier formed the Smokin Joe Frazier Foundation, whose purpose was to give back to troubled and in-need youth. Bouchard volunteered to run the foundation for Frazier and attempted to get a bronze statue of Frazier erected in Philadelphia, but the city declined and opted for the Rocky statue instead. Once Frazier's health declined, the foundation was shelved. In mid-2009, Frazier sold the gymnasium on Broad Street.

He was diagnosed with diabetes and high blood pressure. He and his nemesis, Muhammad Ali, alternated over the years between public apologies and public insults. When Ali lit the 1996 Summer Olympics flame in Atlanta, Frazier told a reporter that he would like to throw Ali into the fire and felt that he should have been chosen to light the flame. Frazier made millions of dollars in the 1970s, but the reported mismanagement of his real estate contributed to some financial difficulties.

The National Trust for Historic Preservation has named Joe Frazier's Gym in its 25th list of America's 11 Most Endangered Historic Places in 2012. In 2013, the gym was named to the National Register of Historic Places.

Frazier continued to train young fighters, although he needed multiple operations for back injuries sustained in a car accident. He and Ali reportedly attempted a reconciliation in his final years. But in October 2006, Frazier still claimed to have won all three bouts between them. He declared to a New York Times reporter, when questioned about his bitterness toward Ali, "I am what I am."

Frazier attempted to revive his music interests in late 2009. Notably popular for singing "Mustang Sally", Frazier teamed up with Welsh Rock Solo artist Jayce Lewis to release his repertoire in the UK, later visiting the Welshman there to host a string of after-dinner speeches and music developments. It would notably be Frazier's last appearance there.

== Death ==
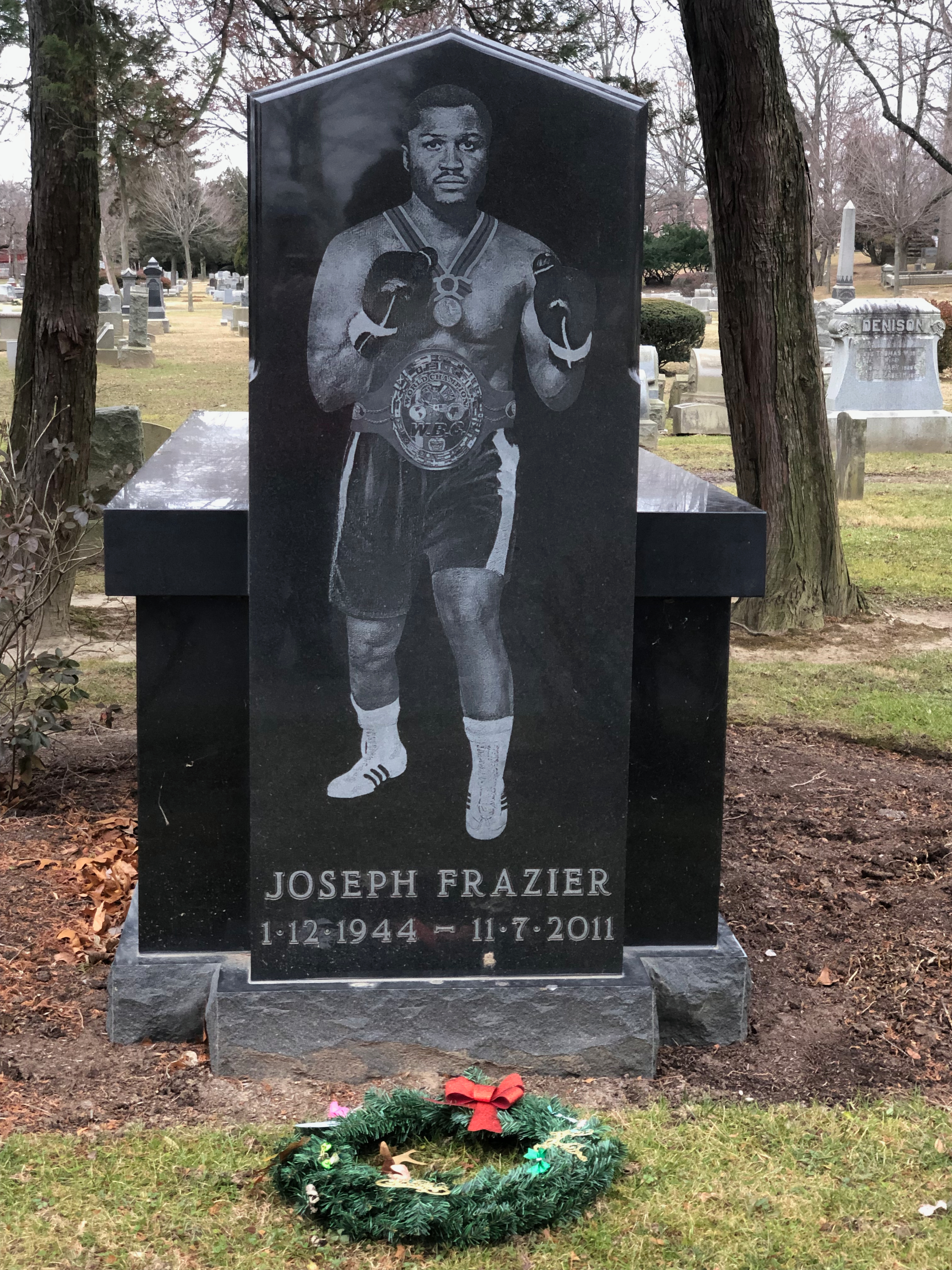
Frazier's headstone and gravesite in Ivy Hill Cemetery in Philadelphia

Frazier was diagnosed with liver cancer in late September 2011. By November 2011, he was under hospice care in Philadelphia, where he died on November 7 at the age of 67. Upon hearing of Frazier's death, Muhammad Ali said, "The world has lost a great champion. I will always remember Joe with respect and admiration."

On November 14, Frazier's private funeral was held at Enon Tabernacle Baptist Church in Philadelphia and was attended by Muhammad Ali, Don King, Larry Holmes, Magic Johnson, Dennis Rodman, his friends and family, and others. Floyd Mayweather Jr. paid for Frazier's funeral services. His body was buried at the Ivy Hill Cemetery in Philadelphia, a short drive from the Enon Tabernacle Baptist Church.

A statue of Frazier was commissioned from sculptor Lawrence Nowlan. Nowlan died unexpectedly, and ultimately a statue sculpted by Philadelphia sculptor Stephen Layne was erected at Stateside Live! in 2015. The statue was relocated to the position at the base of the Rocky Steps at the Philadelphia Art Museum, the former location of the Rocky Statue.

== In popular media ==
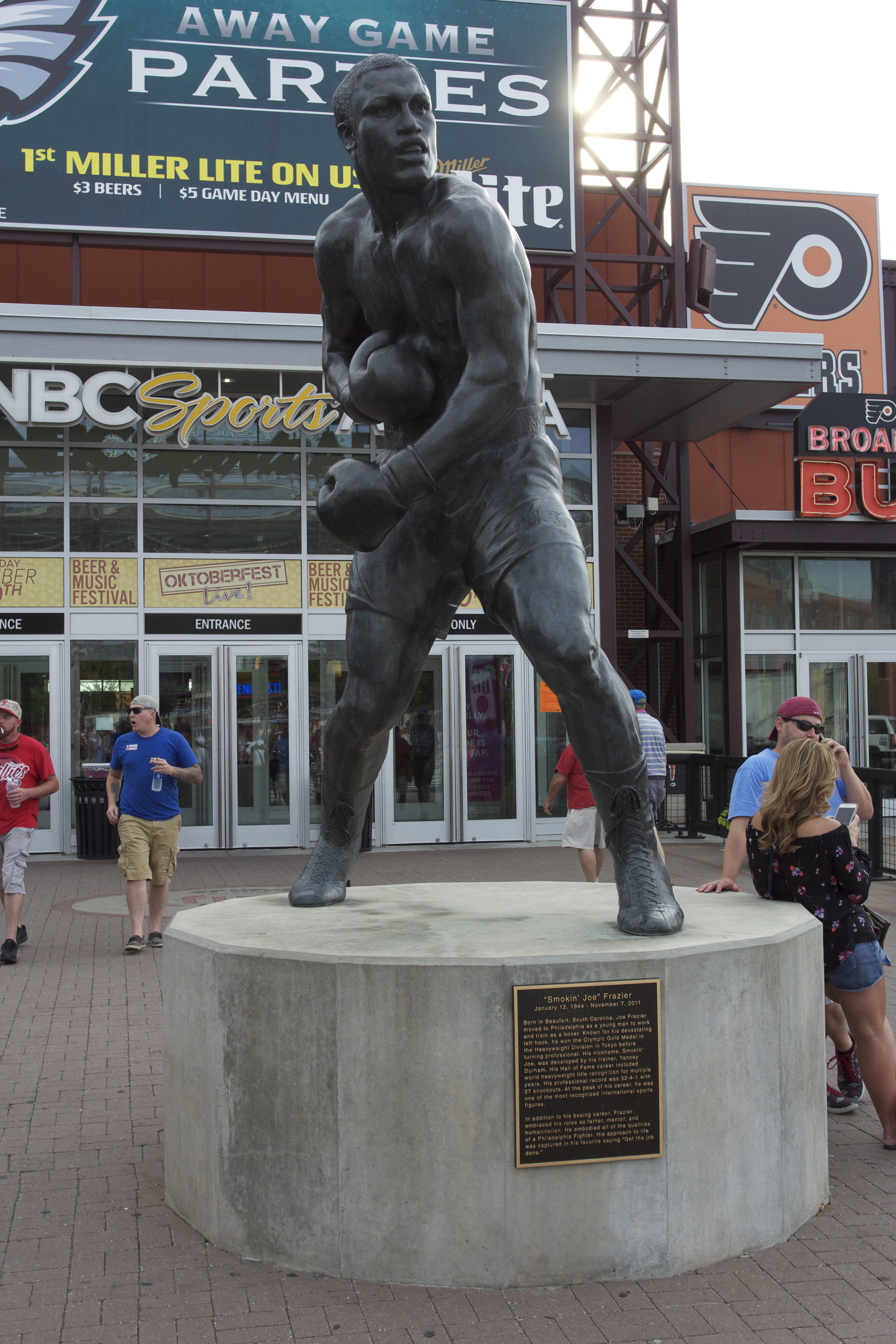
Statue of Frazier in South Philadelphia

- He was played by boxer James Toney in the 2001 film Ali.
- Some of the most memorable moments in the 1976 boxing-themed feature film Rocky, such as Rocky's carcass-punching scenes and Rocky running up the steps of the Philadelphia Museum of Art, as part of his training regimen, are taken from Frazier's real-life exploits. In the film, Frazier makes a cameo appearance, as a spectator at the fight between Rocky and Apollo Creed.
- In March 2007, a Joe Frazier action figure was released as part of a range of toys based on the Rocky film franchise, developed by the American toy manufacturer Jakks Pacific.
- Electric bassist Jeff Berlin wrote a musical tribute simply called "Joe Frazier", originally recorded on the Bill Bruford album Gradually Going Tornado, available on the compilation album Master Strokes.
- He guest-starred as himself in the 1992 The Simpsons episode "Brother, Can You Spare Two Dimes?", where he presented Homer Simpson with the Montgomery Burns Award for the Outstanding Achievement In The Field Of Excellence.
- Mr. Sandman, a video game character in the Punch-Out!! video game series, known for being one of the toughest opponents, was based in part on Frazier.
- In the Fight Night video games, Frazier is a character in each game.
- On July 1, 2021, CBS announced that his son Derek was one of 16 Houseguests participating in Big Brother 23. Derek ended up being the runner-up for that season, winning $75,000.
- Rob Demery will portray him in I Play Rocky

== Professional boxing record ==
37 fights	32 wins	4 losses
By knockout	27	3
By decision	5	1
Draws	1	

No.	Result	Record	Opponent	Type	Round(s), time	Date	Location	Notes
37	Draw	32–4–1	Floyd Cummings	MD	10	Dec 3, 1981	International Amphitheatre, Chicago, Illinois, U.S.	
36	Loss	32–4	George Foreman	TKO	5 (12), 2:26	Jun 15, 1976	Nassau Veterans Memorial Coliseum, Hempstead, New York, U.S.	For NABF heavyweight title
35	Loss	32–3	Muhammad Ali	RTD	14 (15), 3:00	Oct 1, 1975	Philippine Coliseum, Quezon City, Philippines	For WBA, WBC, and The Ring heavyweight titles
34	Win	32–2	Jimmy Ellis	TKO	9 (12), 0:59	Mar 2, 1975	Junction Oval, Melbourne, Australia	
33	Win	31–2	Jerry Quarry	TKO	5 (10), 1:37	Jun 17, 1974	Madison Square Garden, New York City, New York, U.S.	
32	Loss	30–2	Muhammad Ali	UD	12	Jan 28, 1974	Madison Square Garden, New York City, New York, U.S.	For NABF heavyweight title
31	Win	30–1	Joe Bugner	PTS	12	Jul 2, 1973	Earls Court Exhibition Centre, London, England	
30	Loss	29–1	George Foreman	TKO	2 (15), 2:26	Jan 22, 1973	National Stadium, Kingston, Jamaica	Lost WBA, WBC, and The Ring heavyweight titles
29	Win	29–0	Ron Stander	RTD	4 (15), 3:00	May 25, 1972	Civic Auditorium, Omaha, Nebraska, U.S.	Retained WBA, WBC, and The Ring heavyweight titles
28	Win	28–0	Terry Daniels	TKO	4 (15), 1:47	Jan 15, 1972	Rivergate Auditorium, New Orleans, Louisiana, U.S.	Retained WBA, WBC, and The Ring heavyweight titles
27	Win	27–0	Muhammad Ali	UD	15	Mar 8, 1971	Madison Square Garden, New York City, New York, U.S.	Retained WBA, WBC, The Ring heavyweight titles
26	Win	26–0	Bob Foster	KO	2 (15), 0:49	Nov 18, 1970	Cobo Arena, Detroit, Michigan, U.S.	Retained WBA, WBC, and The Ring heavyweight titles
25	Win	25–0	Jimmy Ellis	RTD	4 (15)	Feb 16, 1970	Madison Square Garden, New York City, New York, U.S.	Retained NYSAC heavyweight title; Won WBA and vacant WBC heavyweight titles
24	Win	24–0	Jerry Quarry	RTD	7 (15), 3:00	Jun 23, 1969	Madison Square Garden, New York City, New York, U.S.	Retained NYSAC heavyweight title
23	Win	23–0	Dave Zyglewicz	KO	1 (15), 1:36	Apr 22, 1969	Sam Houston Coliseum, Houston, Texas, U.S.	Retained NYSAC heavyweight title
22	Win	22–0	Oscar Bonavena	UD	15	Dec 10, 1968	Spectrum, Philadelphia, Pennsylvania, U.S.	Retained NYSAC heavyweight title
21	Win	21–0	Manuel Ramos	TKO	2 (15), 3:00	Jun 24, 1968	Madison Square Garden, New York City, New York, U.S.	Retained NYSAC heavyweight title
20	Win	20–0	Buster Mathis	TKO	11 (15), 2:33	Mar 4, 1968	Madison Square Garden, New York City, New York, U.S.	Won vacant NYSAC heavyweight title
19	Win	19–0	Marion Connor	TKO	3 (10), 1:40	Dec 18, 1967	Boston Garden, Boston, Massachusetts, U.S.	
18	Win	18–0	Tony Doyle	TKO	2 (10), 1:04	Oct 17, 1967	Spectrum, Philadelphia, Pennsylvania, U.S.	
17	Win	17–0	George Chuvalo	TKO	4 (10), 0:16	Jul 19, 1967	Madison Square Garden, New York City, New York, U.S.	
16	Win	16–0	George Johnson	UD	10	May 4, 1967	Grand Olympic Auditorium, Los Angeles, California, U.S.	
15	Win	15–0	Jefferson Davis	TKO	5 (10), 0:48	Apr 11, 1967	Auditorium, Miami Beach, Florida, U.S.	
14	Win	14–0	Doug Jones	KO	6 (10), 2:28	Feb 21, 1967	Convention Hall, Philadelphia, Pennsylvania, U.S.	
13	Win	13–0	Eddie Machen	TKO	10 (10), 0:22	Nov 21, 1966	Grand Olympic Auditorium, Los Angeles, California, U.S.	
12	Win	12–0	Oscar Bonavena	SD	10	Sep 21, 1966	Madison Square Garden, New York City, New York, U.S.	
11	Win	11–0	Billy Daniels	RTD	6 (10)	Jul 25, 1966	Convention Hall, Philadelphia, Pennsylvania, U.S.	
10	Win	10–0	Al Jones	KO	1 (10), 2:33	May 26, 1966	Grand Olympic Auditorium, Los Angeles, California, U.S.	
9	Win	9–0	Chuck Leslie	KO	3 (10), 2:47	May 19, 1966	Grand Olympic Auditorium, Los Angeles, California, U.S.	
8	Win	8–0	Don Smith	KO	3 (10), 1:09	Apr 28, 1966	Civic Arena, Pittsburgh, Pennsylvania, U.S.	
7	Win	7–0	Charley Polite	TKO	2 (10), 0:55	Apr 4, 1966	Hotel Philadelphia Auditorium, Philadelphia, Pennsylvania, U.S.	
6	Win	6–0	Dick Wipperman	TKO	5 (8), 2:58	Mar 4, 1966	Madison Square Garden, New York City, New York, U.S.	
5	Win	5–0	Mel Turnbow	KO	1 (8), 1:41	Jan 17, 1966	Convention Hall, Philadelphia, Pennsylvania, U.S.	
4	Win	4–0	Abe Davis	KO	1 (8), 2:38	Nov 11, 1965	Philadelphia Auditorium, Philadelphia, Pennsylvania, U.S.	
3	Win	3–0	Ray Staples	TKO	2 (6), 2:06	Sep 28, 1965	Convention Hall, Philadelphia, Pennsylvania, U.S.	
2	Win	2–0	Mike Bruce	TKO	3 (6), 1:39	Sep 20, 1965	Convention Hall, Philadelphia, Pennsylvania, U.S.	
1	Win	1–0	Woody Goss	TKO	1 (6), 1:42	Aug 16, 1965	Convention Hall, Philadelphia, Pennsylvania, U.S.	

== Titles in boxing ==
=== Major world titles ===
- NYSAC heavyweight champion (200+ lbs)
- WBA heavyweight champion (200+ lbs)
- WBC heavyweight champion (200+ lbs)

=== The Ring magazine titles ===
- The Ring heavyweight champion (200+ lbs)

=== Undisputed titles ===
- Undisputed heavyweight champion

== Music career ==
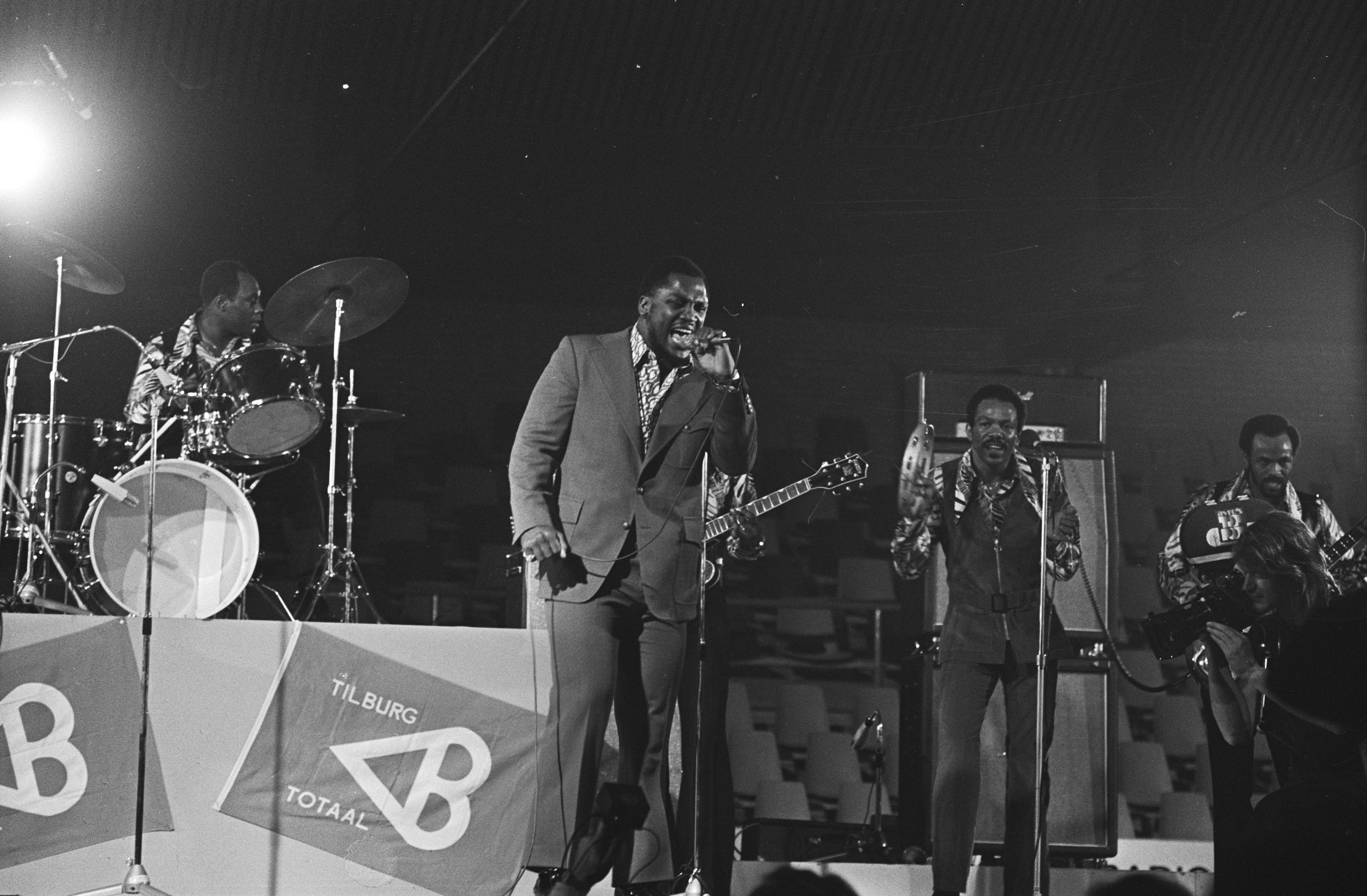
Frazier and his group during the concert in Tilburg, Netherlands, in May 1971

Frazier was a good R&B singer. He sang in public and even recorded a single that was written by Van McCoy. Frazier had at least nine singles released between 1969 and 1976. He was backed by a group called The Knockouts who never made it big but were regulars on the Vegas strip.

According to the R&B Beat column in the 22 June 1968 issue of Record World, Frazier's Cloverlay label single "You Got the Love" was a hit.

It was reported in the 29 March 1969 issue of Record World that heavyweight champion Joe Frazier had been signed to a recording contract with the Capitol label. His release which was scheduled for April was a single "If You Go Stay Gone". It was backed with a folk styled "Truly, Truly Lovin' Me". The A side was a composition by Beau Ray Fleming who co-produced it with Lockie Edwards Jr. The arrangements were by Horace Ott.

Frazier made his Motown debut in 1975 with a Van McCoy composition, "First Round Knockout" which McCoy also produced.

By the late 1970s, Frazier had created a soul-funk group called "Joe Frazier and the Knockouts", who were mentioned in Billboard. Joe toured widely in the US and Europe including Ireland, where among other places he performed in Donegal and Athy, County Kildare with his band. Joe Frazier and the Knockouts were also featured singing in a 1978 Miller beer commercial.

Frazier sang at the 1978 Jerry Lewis Telethon and he sang the Star Spangled Banner before the rematch between Ali and Leon Spinks on September 15, 1978.

=== Discography ===
Singles
Title	Cat	year	Notes #
" If You Go Stay Gone" / "Truly, Truly Lovin' Me"	Capitol 2479	1969	
"Knock Out Drop" / "Gonna Spend My Life"	Capitol 2661	1969	
"The Bigger They Come (The Harder They Fall)" / "Come And Get Me Love"	Cloverlay 100	1970	
"You Got The Love" / "Good News"	Cloverlay 101	1970	
"My Way" / "Come And Get Me Love"	Knockout K-711	1971	
"Try It Again" / "Knock On Wood"	Jobo Records J-100	1974	
"First Round Knock-Out" / "Looky, Looky (Look At Me Girl)"	Motown M 1378F	1975	
"Little Dog Heaven" / "What Ya Gonna Do When The Rain Starts Fallin'"	Prodigal P-0623F	1976	

== See also ==
- List of undisputed boxing champions
- Notable boxing families

== Bibliography ==
- Frazier, Joe (March 1996). Smokin' Joe: The Autobiography. MacMillan. ISBN 002860847X.

== Comics ==
- Combat du siècle (Le) in French, by Loulou Dédola and Luca Ferrara, Éditions Gallimard, Futuropolis, 2021, ISBN 978-2-7548-2541-2.

Sporting positions
World boxing titles
Vacant Title last held by Muhammad Ali	NYSAC heavyweight champion March 4, 1968 – February 16, 1970; Vacated	Title discontinued
Preceded by Jimmy Ellis	WBA heavyweight champion February 16, 1970 – January 22, 1973	Succeeded by George Foreman
Vacant Title last held by Muhammad Ali stripped	WBC heavyweight champion February 16, 1970 – January 22, 1973	Succeeded by George Foreman
Vacant Title last held by Muhammad Ali	Undisputed heavyweight champion February 16, 1970 – January 22, 1973	Succeeded by George Foreman
Vacant Title last held by Muhammad Ali	The Ring heavyweight champion May 1970 – January 22, 1973	Succeeded by George Foreman

Awards
Preceded by Dick Tiger W10 Frank DePaula (October 25, 1968)	Ring Magazine Fight of the Year; 1969—TKO7 Jerry Quarry (June 23)	Succeeded by Carlos Monzón KO12 Nino Benvenuti (November 7, 1970)
Preceded by Carlos Monzón KO12 Nino Benvenuti (November 7, 1970)	Ring Magazine Fight of the Year; 1971—W15 Muhammad Ali (March 8)	Succeeded by Bob Foster KO14 Chris Finnegan (September 26, 1972)
Preceded by Bob Foster KO14 Chris Finnegan (September 26, 1972)	Ring Magazine Fight of the Year; 1973—KOby2 George Foreman (January 22)	Succeeded by Muhammad Ali KO8 George Foreman (October 30, 1974)
Preceded by Muhammad Ali KO8 George Foreman (October 30, 1974)	Ring Magazine Fight of the Year; 1975—KOby14 Muhammad Ali (October 1)	Succeeded by George Foreman KO5 Ron Lyle (January 24, 1976)
