= Mac Foster =

American boxer (1942–2010)

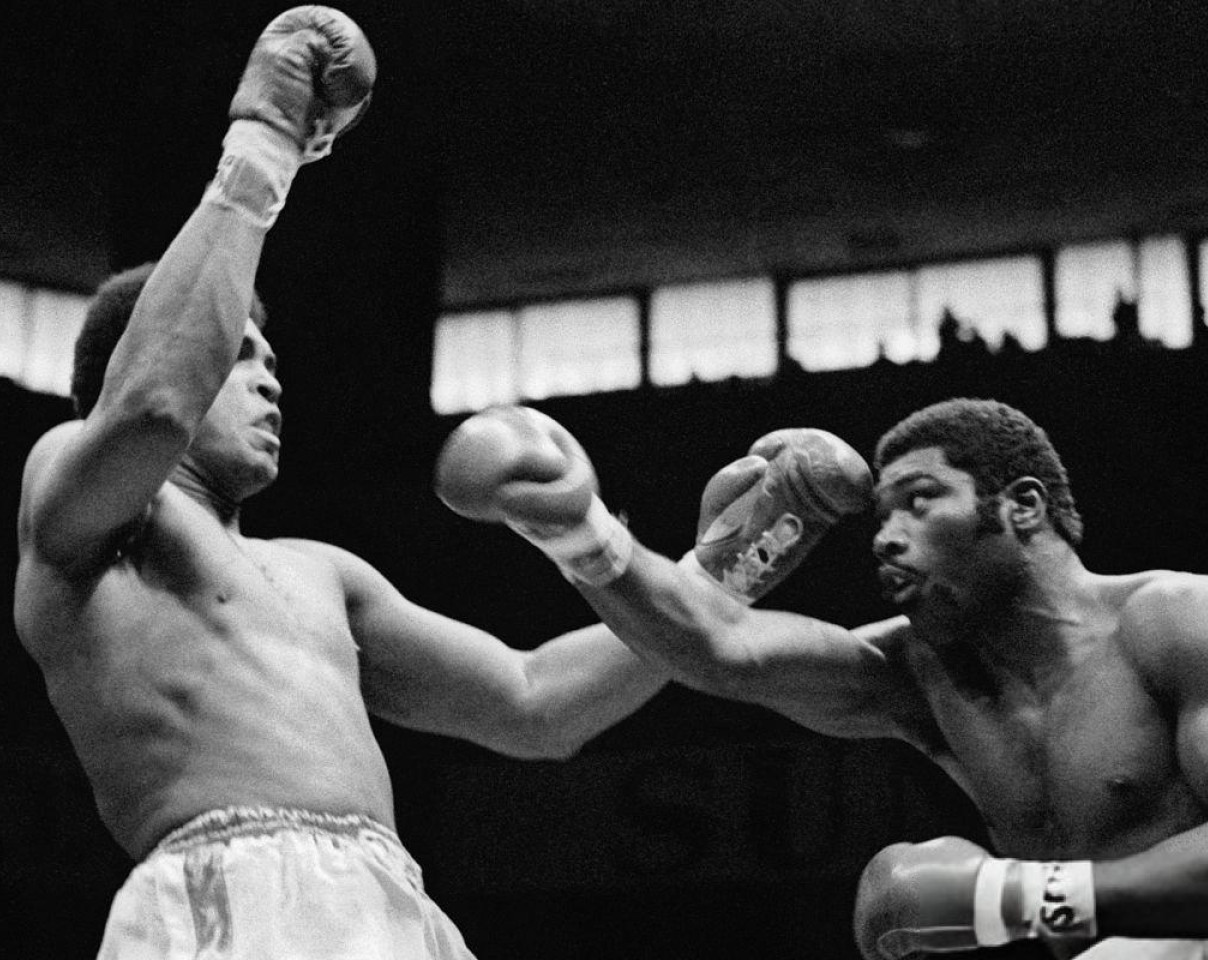
- Foster (right) during his fight against Muhammad Ali

Personal information
- Nickname: Big Mac 'The Knife' from Fresno
- Nationality: American
- Born: MacArthur Foster; June 27, 1942 Alexandria, Virginia, United States
- Died: July 19, 2010 (aged 68) Fresno, California, United States
- Height: 6 ft 2 in (188 cm)

Boxing career
- Stance: Orthodox

Boxing record
- Total fights: 37
- Wins: 30
- Win by KO: 30
- Losses: 6

MacArthur "Mac" Foster (June 27, 1942 – July 19, 2010) was an American heavyweight professional boxer.

He competed from 1966 to 1976, winning 30 of his 36 professional bouts, with all his victories achieved by knockout. He stopped heavyweight contenders Thad Spencer, Cleveland Williams, whom he defeated twice, and Zora Folley. Foster went the distance against Muhammad Ali in April 1972, losing by a 15-round unanimous decision. He also lost a title fight against former WBC champion Marty Lewis by 7th-round KO.

== Early life ==
Foster was born in Alexandria, Virginia, the third of eleven children, of a Mississippi sharecropping family. He spent his childhood years in Fresno, California, where his father found employment as a nurse. Foster picked grapes and cotton as a youth. Fresno State University offered him a track and field scholarship out of Washington High School, but he declined the opportunity, choosing instead to enlist with the United States Marines. Whilst serving with the Marines he won fourteen amateur boxing titles, and was deployed for two combat tours in the Vietnam War. After a discharge from the Marines with the rank of sergeant, Foster turned professional, becoming the third Fresno boxer of note (Young Corbett III was a world welterweight champion and Wayne Thornton rose through the rankings to become a number one heavyweight contender in 1970). He trained with Pat DiFuria at the Merced Street Gym.

== Boxing career ==
Standing at 6 ft 2" in height and known as "Big Mac The Knife from Fresno", Foster made his professional debut in 1966, winning his first 24 fights by knockout, and was named The Ring's Progress of the Year for 1969. Britain's Boxing Illustrated wrote, "He could certainly whack!"

Whilst being employed as a sparring partner for Sonny Liston, Foster was reputed to have knocked down the former world champion, causing Liston two days later to work Foster over during another sparring session before handlers could intervene between the two men to stop it.

=== Big fights ===
In 1969 Foster knocked out contender Thad Spencer in the first round, and twice knocked out a past his prime Cleveland Williams.

By 1970 Foster was ranked as the world's number one heavyweight contender and seemed set for a title shot, but his 24–0 winning streak came to an end when as favourite he was stopped in six rounds by the more experienced Jerry Quarry in June 1970. After the Quarry fight, Foster knocked out ageing and by then unranked Zora Folley in one round.

=== Versus Muhammad Ali ===
In April 1972 Foster faced Muhammad Ali in Tokyo in a rare 15-round, non-title bout. Although he defied Ali's prediction of a fifth-round stoppage by lasting the distance, Foster lost a clear decision to the former champion, winning just two rounds, one round, and no rounds on the three judges' respective scorecards. Foster had never been in a professional fight longer than eight rounds before facing Ali.

=== Last fights ===
Foster followed up his loss to Ali with knockouts of journeymen Sam McGill and Charles Williams. He was then outpointed by Bob Stallings, Joe Bugner, and Henry Clark in consecutive bouts.

Foster served as George Foreman's sparring partner for Foreman's world title bout with Ken Norton in 1974. He retired from boxing in 1976 after losing his fourth consecutive decision, this time to prospect Stan Ward. Foster's final record was 30–6, with all 30 of his wins coming by knockout.

== Later life ==
After retiring, Foster volunteered his time as boxing coach for youth.

== Death ==
Foster died at the age of 68 of MRSA on Monday, July 19, 2010. His body was buried at the San Joaquin Valley National Cemetery in Santa Nella, California.

== Personal life ==
He married Yolanda, the marriage producing four children, Gregory, Joshua, Nathaniel and Nicole.

== Professional boxing record ==
30 Wins (30 knockouts), 6 Losses (1 knockout, 5 decisions)
Result	Record	Opponent	Type	Round	Date	Location	Notes
Loss	30–6	(United States) Stan Ward	UD	10	February 26, 1976	(United States) San Jose Civic Auditorium, San Jose, California	
Loss	30–5	(United States) Henry Clark	UD	10	May 30, 1974	(United States) Oakland–Alameda County Coliseum, Oakland, California	1–7, 1–7, 3–7
Loss	30–4	(United Kingdom) Joe Bugner	PTS	10	November 13, 1973	(United Kingdom) Empire Pool, Wembley, London	96.5–100
Loss	30–3	(United States) Bob Stallings	SD	10	June 30, 1973	(United States) Aragon Ballroom, Chicago, Illinois	
Win	30–2	(United States) Charles "Hercules" Williams	KO	10	May 3, 1973	(United States) Chicago, Illinois	
Win	29–2	(United States) Sam McGill	TKO	9	April 11, 1973	(United States) Aragon Ballroom, Chicago, Illinois	
Loss	28–2	(United States) Muhammad Ali	UD	15	April 1, 1972	(Japan) Nihon Budokan, Tokyo	65–73, 67–75, 66–74
Win	28–1	(Italy) Giuseppe Ros	KO	8	December 26, 1971	(Switzerland) Hallenstadion, Zurich	
Win	27–1	(United States) Billy Joiner	KO	5	July 29, 1971	(United States) Olympic Auditorium, Los Angeles, California	
Win	26–1	(United States) Mike Boswell	TKO	4	March 25, 1971	(United States) Olympic Auditorium, Los Angeles, California	
Win	25–1	(United States) Zora Folley	KO	1	September 29, 1970	(United States) Selland Arena, Fresno, California	Folley knocked out at 3:04 of the first round.
Loss	24–1	(United States) Jerry Quarry	KO	6	June 17, 1970	(United States) Madison Square Garden, New York City	Foster knocked out at 2:05 of the sixth round.
Win	24–0	(United States) Jack O'Halloran	KO	1	April 9, 1970	(United States) Olympic Auditorium, Los Angeles, California	
Win	23–0	(United States) Jimmy Rossette	KO	4	March 24, 1970	(United States) Selland Arena, Fresno, California	
Win	22–0	(Canada) Bob Felstein	KO	2	December 16, 1969	(United States) Selland Arena, Fresno, California	
Win	21–0	(United States) Cleveland Williams	KO	3	November 18, 1969	(United States) Sam Houston Coliseum, Houston, Texas	
Win	20–0	(United States) Cleveland Williams	TKO	5	September 13, 1969	(United States) Selland Arena, Fresno, California	Referee stopped the bout at 1:35 of the fifth round.
Win	19–0	(United States) Roger Russell	TKO	3	August 19, 1969	(United States) Selland Arena, Fresno, California	
Win	18–0	(United States) Thad Spencer	KO	1	May 20, 1969	(United States) Selland Arena, Fresno, California	
Win	17–0	(United States) Roger Rischer	KO	4	January 21, 1969	(United States) Selland Arena, Fresno, California	
Win	16–0	(United States) Joe Hemphill	TKO	3	November 27, 1968	(United States) Silver Slipper, Las Vegas, Nevada	
Win	15–0	(United States) Tommy Fields	TKO	5	August 16, 1968	(United States) Centennial Coliseum, Reno, Nevada	
Win	14–0	(Canada) Tommy Burns	KO	1	August 8, 1968	(United States) Seattle Center Arena, Seattle, Washington	
Win	13–0	(United States) Curtis Bruce	TKO	3	July 9, 1968	(United States) Selland Arena, Fresno, California	
Win	12–0	(United States) Sonny Moore	KO	2	April 2, 1968	(United States) Selland Arena, Fresno, California	Moore knocked out at 2:50 of the second round.
Win	11–0	(United States) Steve Grant	TKO	2	February 27, 1968	(United States) Selland Arena, Fresno, California	
Win	10–0	(United States) Hubert Hilton	TKO	5	January 23, 1968	(United States) Selland Arena, Fresno, California	
Win	9–0	(United States) Roy Wallace	KO	7	November 28, 1967	(United States) Selland Arena, Fresno, California	
Win	8–0	(United States) Ray Junior Ellis	KO	2	October 11, 1967	(United States) Selland Arena, Fresno, California	
Win	7–0	(United States) Floyd Joyner	TKO	7	August 29, 1967	(United States) Selland Arena, Fresno, California	Joyner down in the sixth and seventh rounds. Foster caught Joyner in a barrage of punches and the referee stopped the bout at 1:45.
Win	6–0	(Cuba) Lino Armenteros	KO	3	June 13, 1967	(United States) Selland Arena, Fresno, California	Armentiros knocked out at 0:59 of the third round. Armenteros retired after this bout.
Win	5–0	(United States) Lou Phillips	KO	3	May 9, 1967	(United States) Selland Arena, Fresno, California	Phillips knocked out at 1:53 of the first round.
Win	4–0	(United States) L.J. Wheeler	TKO	6	March 14, 1967	(United States) Selland Arena, Fresno, California	Wheeler down in the third round and three times in the sixth.
Win	3–0	(United States) Sam Wyatt	KO	1	February 6, 1967	(United States) Selland Arena, Fresno, California	Wyatt knocked out at 0:13 of the first round. One of the quickest fights in Boxing history.
Win	2–0	(United States) Leroy Birmingham	KO	1	January 5, 1967	(United States) Olympic Auditorium, Los Angeles, California	Birmingham knocked out at 2:12 of the first round.
Win	1–0	(United States) Jimmy Gilmore	KO	3	November 28, 1966	(United States) Las Vegas, Nevada	
