= Abdul Rehman (boxer) =

Pakistani boxer (born 1938)

Personal information
- Nationality: Pakistani
- Born: 14 April 1938 (age 87)

Sport
- Sport: Boxing

Abdul Rehman (born 14 April 1938) is a Pakistani boxer. He competed in the men's heavyweight event at the 1964 Summer Olympics. At the 1964 Summer Olympics, after receiving a bye in the Round of 16, he lost to Hans Huber of the United Team of Germany in a quarterfinal.
