= Muhammad Ali vs. Mac Foster =

Boxing competition

- Date: 1 April 1972
- Venue: Nippon Budokan, Tokyo, Japan

Tale of the tape
Boxer	(United States) Muhammad Ali	(United States) Mac Foster
Nickname	"The Greatest"	"Big Mac The Knife from Fresno"
Hometown	Louisville, Kentucky, U.S.	Alexandria, Virginia, U.S.
Purse	$200,000	$80,000
Pre-fight record	34–1 (27 KO)	28–1 (28 KO)
Age	30 years, 2 months	29 years, 9 months
Height	6 ft 3 in (191 cm)	6 ft 2 in (188 cm)
Weight	226 lb (103 kg)	211 3/4 lb (96 kg)
Style	Orthodox	Orthodox
Recognition	WBA/WBC; No. 1 Ranked Heavyweight; NABF heavyweight champion Former undisputed heavyweight champion	WBA; No. 9 Ranked Heavyweight

Result
- Ali won via 15 round UD

Muhammad Ali vs. Mac Foster was a professional boxing match contested on 1 April 1972.

== Background ==
Held in Tokyo, it was one of the first major heavyweight boxing matches to be held in Asia. Ali, who came in at a career high 226 lb, predicted he would knock out Foster in five rounds and entered the ring holding the round five ring card.

== The fight ==
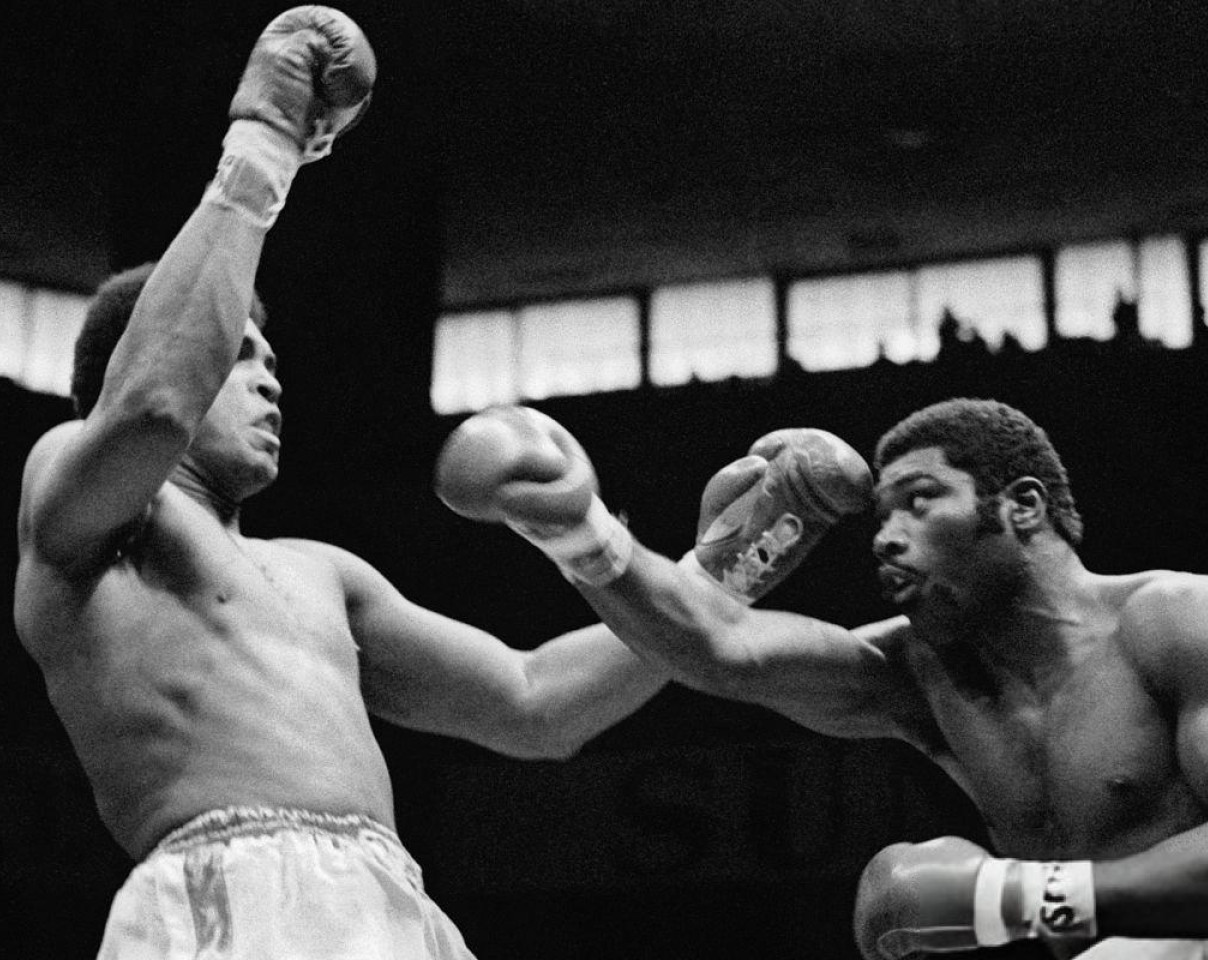

Ali won the fight on points through a unanimous decision.

== Undercard ==
Confirmed bouts:

== Broadcasting ==
Country	Broadcaster
Mexico	Telesistema Mexicano
Philippines	ABS-CBN
United Kingdom	BBC
United States	CBS

Preceded by vs. Jürgen Blin	Muhammad Ali's bouts 1 April 1972	Succeeded by vs. George Chuvalo II
Preceded by vs. Giuseppe Ros	Mac Foster's bouts 1 April 1972	Succeeded by vs. Sam McGill
