= Giuseppe Ros =

Italian boxer (1942–2022)

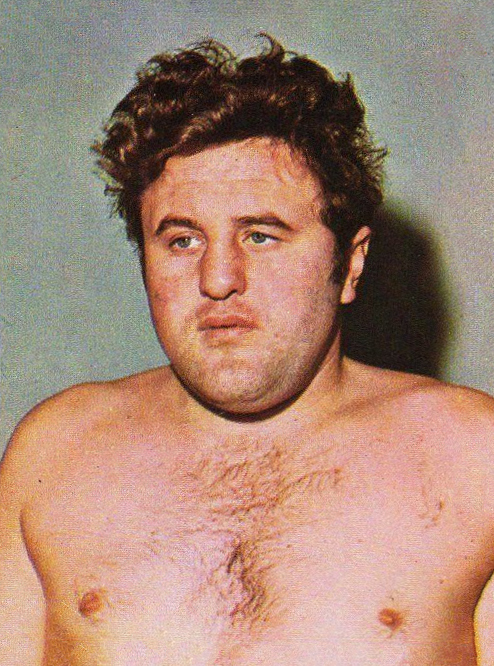
- Ros in 1973

Personal information
- Nationality: Italian
- Born: 22 September 1942 Mareno di Piave, Italy
- Died: 17 February 2022 (aged 79) Vittorio Veneto, Italy
- Height: 1.79 m (5 ft 10 in)
- Weight: Heavyweight

Boxing career
- Stance: Orthodox

Boxing record
- Total fights: 60
- Wins: 42
- Win by KO: 24
- Losses: 16
- Draws: 2
Medal record
Representing Italy
Olympic Games
Bronze medal – third place	1964 Tokyo	Heavyweight

Giuseppe "Bepi" Ros (22 September 1942 – 17 February 2022) was an Italian professional boxer. After winning a bronze medal at the 1964 Olympics he turned professional, and spent most of career fighting in Italy. He retired in 1976.

Ros died from COVID-19 on 17 February 2022, at the age of 79.

== 1964 Olympic results ==
Below are the results of Giuseppe Ros of Italy who competed as a heavyweight boxer at the 1964 Tokyo Olympics:

- Round of 16: defeated Iosef Nemec (Norway) on points, 4-1
- Quarterfinal: defeated Vasile Marijutan (Romania) by disqualification
- Semifinal: lost to Hans Huber (United Team of Germany) on points, 1-4 (was awarded bronze medal)

== Professional boxing record ==
42 Wins (24 knockouts, 17 decisions, 1 DQ), 16 Losses (1 knockout, 15 decisions), 2 Draws
Result	Record	Opponent	Type	Round	Date	Location	Notes
Loss	21-0	(Italy) Alfio Righetti	PTS	8	17 December 1976	(Italy) Milan, Lombardy	
Loss	40-13-5	(Italy) Dante Crane	PTS	12	30 September 1976	(Italy) Reggio Emilia, Emilia-Romagna	Italy Heavyweight Title.
Loss	31-5-1	(South Africa) Mike Schutte	PTS	10	9 July 1976	West Ridge Tennis Stadium, Durban, South Africa	
Loss	4-0-1	(Uruguay) Alfredo Evangelista	PTS	8	2 April 1976	(Spain) Madrid	
Win	50-8-4	(Spain) Jose Manuel Urtain	PTS	8	5 December 1975	(Spain) Madrid	
Loss	13-1	(Norway) Bjorn Rudi	PTS	8	25 September 1975	(Norway) Messehallen, Oslo	
Loss	13-0-1	(Italy) Lorenzo Zanon	PTS	12	26 May 1975	(Italy) Milan, Lombardy	Italy Heavyweight Title.
Loss	17-1-1	(Germany) Bernd August	PTS	8	18 March 1975	(Germany) Berlin	
Win	10-10	(Mexico) Alfredo Mongol Ortiz	TKO	5	14 December 1974	(Italy) Treviso, Veneto	
Win	10-8	(Mexico) Alfredo Mongol Ortiz	PTS	8	21 September 1974	(Italy) Pordenone, Friuli-Venezia Giulia	
Draw	36-11-4	(Italy) Dante Cane	PTS	12	26 July 1974	(Italy) Conegliano, Veneto	Italy Heavyweight Title.
Win	15-28-3	(United States) Charley Polite	PTS	10	19 April 1974	(Italy) Treviso, Veneto	
Win	10-16-2	(United States) Rico Brooks	KO	5	1 March 1974	(Italy) Udine, Friuli-Venezia Giulia	
Draw	11-21-3	(Italy) Vasco Faustino	PTS	10	26 December 1973	(Italy) Bologna, Emilia-Romagna	
Loss	43-6-1	(Australia) Joe Bugner	UD	15	2 October 1973	(United Kingdom) Royal Albert Hall, Kensington, London	EBU Heavyweight Title. 70-72, 68-74, 63-75.
Win	50-17-14	(Argentina) Miguel Angel Paez	PTS	8	25 May 1973	(Italy) Reggio Emilia, Emilia-Romagna	
Win	8-0	(Mexico) Alfredo Mongol Ortiz	PTS	10	7 April 1973	(Italy) Udine, Friuli-Venezia Giulia	
Win	31-1	(Italy) Mario Baruzzi	TKO	4	26 December 1972	(Italy) Rome, Lazio	Italy Heavyweight Title.
Win	7-15	(United States) Johnny MacArthur Swindell	TKO	6	30 September 1972	(Italy) Pordenone, Friuli-Venezia Giulia	
Win	33-8-4	(Italy) Dante Cane	PTS	12	8 July 1972	(Italy) Conegliano, Veneto	Italy Heavyweight Title.
Win	10-12-2	(Italy) Vasco Faustino	PTS	10	29 April 1972	(Italy) Schio, Veneto	
Win	14-3-1	(Italy) Armando Zanini	TKO	7	18 March 1972	(Italy) Sirmione, Lombardy	Italy Heavyweight Title.
Loss	27-1	(United States) Mac Foster	KO	8	26 December 1971	(Switzerland) Hallenstadion, Zurich	
Win	6-5-1	(United States) Rene Kinsey	TKO	2	26 November 1971	(Italy) Turin, Piedmont	
Loss	28-7-4	(Italy) Dante Cane	PTS	12	2 October 1971	(Italy) Bologna, Emilia-Romagna	Italy Heavyweight Title.
Win	7-3-1	(Trinidad and Tobago) Wendell Joseph	PTS	10	4 September 1971	(Italy) Conegliano, Veneto	
Win	0-4	(Venezuela) Danny Machado	TKO	3	10 July 1971	(Italy) Conegliano, Veneto	
Win	22-0	(Italy) Mario Baruzzi	KO	12	23 April 1971	(Italy) Bologna, Emilia-Romagna	Italy Heavyweight Title.
Win	21-36	(United States) Ollie Wilson	PTS	8	6 March 1971	(Italy) Palazzetto dello Sport, Rome, Lazio	
Win	4-11-1	(Aruba) Ireno Werleman	KO	1	26 December 1970	(Italy) Treviso, Veneto	
Loss	19-0	(Italy) Mario Baruzzi	PTS	12	18 November 1970	(Italy) Turin, Piedmont	Italy Heavyweight Title.
Win	4-3-2	(Brazil) Getulio Bueno	PTS	8	14 October 1970	(Italy) Udine, Friuli-Venezia Giulia	
Win	3-5	(Hungary) Ferenc Kristofcsak	KO	4	31 July 1970	(Italy) Conegliano, Veneto	
Win	--	(United States) Willie Moore	PTS	8	27 June 1970	(Italy) Treviso, Veneto	
Win	26-6-4	(Italy) Dante Cane	KO	11	15 May 1970	(Italy) Bologna, Emilia-Romagna	Italy Heavyweight Title.
Win	5-5-1	(Germany) Peter Schulze	TKO	8	21 February 1970	(Italy) Treviso, Veneto	
Win	3-7	(Germany) Burghard Lembke	PTS	6	2 October 1969	(Italy) Treviso, Veneto	
Loss	13-7	(Antigua and Barbuda) Rocky Campbell	PTS	8	14 September 1968	(Italy) Crispiano, Apulia	
Loss	11-5-5	(Germany) Juergen Blin	PTS	8	15 December 1967	(Germany) Sporthalle, Cologne, North Rhine-Westphalia	
Loss	25-3	(Wales) Carl Gizzi	PTS	8	14 October 1967	(Italy) Treviso, Veneto	
Win	8-3-2	(Italy) Ermanno Festorazzi	KO	7	13 August 1967	(Italy) Senigallia, Marche	
Win	29-39-6	(Spain) Jose Mariano Moracia Ibanes	PTS	8	28 June 1967	(Italy) Treviso, Veneto	
Loss	23-3	(Wales) Carl Gizzi	PTS	10	17 April 1967	(United Kingdom) London Hilton on Park Lane Hotel, Mayfair, London	49-49.5.
Win	32-31-15	(Argentina) Jose Angel Manzur	KO	7	23 December 1966	(Italy) Rome, Lazio	
Win	5-3-1	(Italy) Pietro Besi	TKO	2	2 December 1966	(Italy) Palazzetto dello Sport, Rome, Lazio	
Loss	12-1-1	(United Kingdom) Billy Gray	PTS	8	10 October 1966	(United Kingdom) Grosvenor House, Mayfair, London	
Win	8-3	(United Kingdom) Roy Enifer	KO	2	18 September 1966	(Italy) Verona, Veneto	
Win	10-28-2	(Belgium) Andre Wyns	KO	4	24 July 1966	(Italy) Conegliano, Veneto	
Win	12-4-2	(Italy) Franco Badalassi	PTS	8	19 February 1966	(Italy) Treviso, Veneto	
Win	30-28-14	(Argentina) Jose Angel Manzur	PTS	8	20 January 1966	(Italy) Milan, Lombardy	
Win	21-20-5	(United Kingdom) Ron Redrup	DQ	7	3 December 1965	(Italy) Palazzetto dello Sport, Rome, Lazio	
Win	7-13-2	(Belgium) Valere Mahau	KO	3	5 November 1965	(Italy) Milan, Lombardy	
Win	19-4	(United Kingdom) Dave Ould	KO	3	15 October 1965	(Italy) Palazzetto dello Sport, Rome, Lazio	
Win	6-5-1	(Italy) Roberto Bracco	TKO	4	12 September 1965	(Italy) Mestre, Veneto	
Win	2-14	(Germany) Manfred Ackers	KO	2	21 August 1965	(Italy) San Dona Di Piave, Veneto	
Win	1-8-4	(Martinique) Henri Ferjules	KO	1	31 July 1965	(Italy) Venice, Veneto	
Win	2-12	(Germany) Manfred Ackers	KO	5	29 May 1965	(Italy) Sona, Veneto	
Win	9-12-3	(Italy) Giancarlo Bacchini	PTS	6	23 April 1965	(Italy) Palazzetto dello Sport, Rome, Lazio	
Win	6-23-1	(France) Rene Goubelle	KO	1	3 April 1965	(Italy) Genoa, Liguria	
Win	9-11-3	(Italy) Giancarlo Bacchini	PTS	6	6 March 1965	(Italy) Treviso, Veneto	
