= Rudolf Meier =

Swiss boxer

Personal information
- Nationality: Swiss
- Born: 23 June 1939
- Died: 17 July 2018 (aged 79)

Sport
- Sport: Boxing

Rudolf Meier (23 June 1939 – 17 July 2018) was a Swiss boxer. He competed in the men's heavyweight event at the 1964 Summer Olympics. At the 1964 Summer Olympics, he lost to Santiago Lovell Jr. of Argentina.
