= Boxing at the 1964 Summer Olympics – Heavyweight =

Boxing competitions

The heavyweight class in the boxing at the 1964 Summer Olympics competition was the heaviest class. Heavyweights included all boxers weighing in at more than 81 kilograms. 14 boxers from 14 nations competed.

== Medalists ==
Gold	Joe Frazier; United States
Silver	Hans Huber; United Team of Germany
Bronze	Giuseppe Ros; Italy
Bronze	Vadim Yemelyanov; Soviet Union

== Results ==
Round of 16
Huber (EUA)
Bye
Rehman (PAK)
Bye
15 October
Pandov (BUL)	0
Mariuţan (ROU)	5
15 October
Ros (ITA)	4
Nemec (TCH)	1
15 October
Maruyama (JPN)	0
McQueen (AUS)	5
15 October
Oywello (UGA)	RSC
Frazier (USA)	W
15 October
Jedrzejewski (POL)	RSC
Vadim Yemelyanov (URS)	W
15 October
Meier (SUI)	DQ
Lovell (ARG)	W

Quarter-finals
19 October
Huber (EUA)	KO
Rehman (PAK)	L
19 October
Mariuţan (ROU)	DQ
Ros (ITA)	W
19 October
McQueen (AUS)	RSC
Frazier (USA)	W
19 October
Yemelyanov (URS)	KO
Lovell (ARG)	L

Semi-finals
21 October
Huber (EUA)	4
Ros (ITA) (bronze)	1
21 October
Frazier (USA)	W
Yemelyanov (URS) (bronze)	RSC

Final
23 October
Huber (EUA) (silver)	2
Frazier (USA) (gold)	3

== Sources ==
Tokyo Organizing Committee (1964). The Games of the XVIII Olympiad: Tokyo 1964, vol. 2.
