= Tadayuki Maruyama =

Japanese boxer

Personal information
- Nationality: Japanese
- Born: 29 January 1942 (age 83); Matsuyama, Ehime, Japan

Sport
- Sport: Boxing

Tadayuki Maruyama (丸山 忠行, Maruyama Tadayuki, born 29 January 1942) is a Japanese boxer. He competed in the men's heavyweight event at the 1964 Summer Olympics. At the 1964 Summer Olympics, he lost to Athol McQueen of Australia.
