= Joe Frazier's Gym =

Boxing gym in Pennsylvania

- U.S. National Register of Historic Places
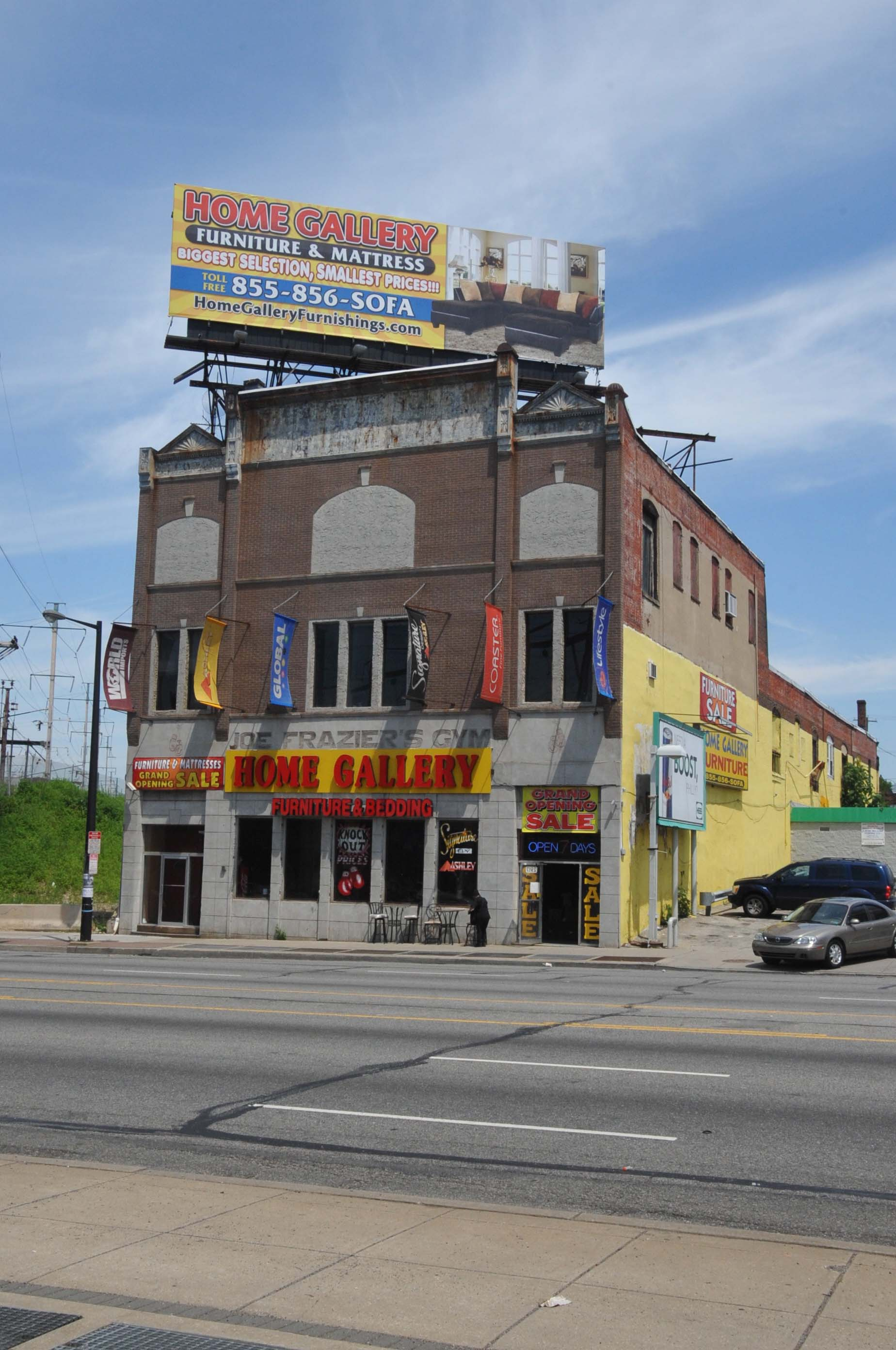
- Joe Frazier's Gym in 2013.
- Coordinates: 39.997515, -75.153153
- Built: c. 1895
- Architectural style: Classical Revival
- NRHP reference No.: 13000257
- Added to NRHP: 4/30/2013

Joe Frazier's Gym was a training facility owned by American professional boxer, Joe Frazier. Frazier trained at the gym while preparing for his 1971 Fight of the Century against Muhammad Ali.

== History ==
Joe Frazier's Gym stands at 2917 N. Broad Street in Philadelphia. The building was constructed around 1895 and originally served as a window sash and blind warehouse. Several companies, including the Benson Manufacturing Company and the Air Craft Plastics Company, were listed at this address.

The building remained in industrial use until Cloverlay Inc., an investment group that sponsored Joe Frazier, purchased the property for his use in 1968. The gym served as Frazier's training center for his highest-profile fights, including his championship bouts against Muhammad Ali and George Foreman.

Following his 1975 retirement, Frazier purchased the gym from his investors and opened it to the public. For the following 25 years, Frazier trained boxers at the gym, including Golden Gloves Heavyweight Champion Duane Bobick, Bert Cooper, and Olympic medalist Terrance Cauthen. The gym was also open to local inner-city youth.

Frazier, who maintained an apartment above the gym, was forced to sell the building due to debt and back taxes in 2008.

== Preservation ==
The gym was purchased by Broad Enterprises Group L.L.C. in 2011 and is currently leased to a discount furniture store.

After efforts from preservationists and local politicians, Joe Frazier's Gym was added to the National Register of Historic Places in April 2013. In April 2018, a portion of Glenwood Avenue near the gym was named "Smokin' Joe Frazier Boulevard".

== See also ==
- 5th Street Gym
