= Muhammad Ali vs. George Chuvalo II =

1972 boxing match

- Date: 1 May 1972
- Venue: Pacific Coliseum, Vancouver, British Columbia, Canada
- Title(s) on the line: NABF heavyweight title

Tale of the tape
Boxer	(United States) Muhammad Ali	(Canada) George Chuvalo
Nickname	"The Greatest"	
Hometown	Louisville, Kentucky, U.S.	Toronto, Ontario, Canada
Purse	$500,000	$65,000
Pre-fight record	35–1 (25 KO)	66–17–2 (57 KO)
Age	30 years, 3 months	34 years, 7 months
Height	6 ft 3 in (191 cm)	6 ft 0 in (183 cm)
Weight	217 1/2 lb (99 kg)	221 lb (100 kg)
Style	Orthodox	Orthodox
Recognition	NABF heavyweight champion Former undisputed heavyweight champion	Canadian heavyweight champion

Result
- Ali defeated Chuvalo via 12th round UD

Muhammad Ali vs. George Chuvalo II was a professional boxing match contested on 1 May 1972, for the NABF heavyweight championship.

== Background ==
In the build up Ali predicted he would drop Chuvalo, who had never been knocked down in his career saying that "I'm not gonna let it be said there was ever a heavyweight that didn't fall. They have pictures showing my heels. Jack Johnson fell, Jack Dempsey fell, Sugar Ray Robinson fell, Joe Frazier fell, and George Chuvalo is gonna fall." Chuvalo meanwhile claimed he had improved since his first bout with Ali six years earlier, saying "I'm a better fighter than I was in 1966 and he's not as good a fighter as he was then."

== The fight ==
Despite dominating and landing many flush shot on Chuvalo, Ali was unable to drop the Canadian who was able to last the full 12 round duration.

Ali won the fight by unanimous decision.

== Aftermath ==
Ali would praise Chuvalo's durability saying that "I thought I could drop him, but I couldn't. He took all my best shots and he hurt me with a couple of hard rights and a hook." While Chuvalo would admit that Ali was in better shape than he had expected.

== Undercard ==
Confirmed bouts:

== Broadcasting ==
Country	Broadcaster
Mexico	Telesistema Mexicano
Philippines	ABS-CBN
United Kingdom	BBC
United States	NBC

Preceded by vs. Mac Foster	Muhammad Ali's bouts 1 May 1972	Succeeded by vs. Jerry Quarry II
Preceded by vs. Jim Christopher	George Chuvalo's bouts 1 May 1972	Succeeded by vs. Tommy Burns
