= George Oywello =

Ugandan boxer

Personal information
- Nationality: Ugandan
- Born: George Oywello; 17 January 1939 Gulu, Uganda
- Died: 1965 (aged 26)
- Height: 181 cm (5 ft 11 in)
- Weight: Heavyweight, Light heavyweight

Boxing career
Medal record
Men's Boxing
| Gold medal – first place | 1962 Perth | Heavyweight |

George Oywello (17 January 1939 - 1965) was a Ugandan boxer. Born in Gulu, Uganda, Oywello competed for Uganda in both the 1960 Olympics in Rome and the 1964 Olympics in Tokyo. In 1964 boxing in the heavyweight competition he was beaten by eventual gold medal winner, Joe Frazier. He died in a car accident in 1965.

== 1960 Olympic results ==
Below is the record of George Oywello, a Ugandan light heavyweight boxer who competed at the 1960 Rome Olympics:

- Round of 32: bye
- Round of 16: lost to Gheorghe Negrea (Romania) on points, 0-5.

== 1964 Olympics results ==
Below is the record of George Oywello, a Ugandan heavyweight boxer who competed at the 1964 Tokyo Olympics:

- Round of 16: lost to Joe Frazier (United States) referee stopped contest

== 1962 British Empire and Commonwealth Games ==
In the 1962 British Empire and Commonwealth Games in Perth, Western Australia, Oywello won a gold medal in the heavyweight competition beating New Zealander, Bill Kini in the final.
