= Vadim Yemelyanov =

Russian boxer (1942–1977)

Personal information
- Born: 25 April 1942 Konyok, Krasnodar Kray, Russian SFSR, Soviet Union
- Died: 27 May 1977 (aged 35) Severomorsk, Russian SFSR, Soviet Union
- Height: 188 cm (6 ft 2 in)
- Weight: 97 kg (214 lb)

Sport
- Sport: Boxing
- Club: Soviet Army
Medal record
Representing the Soviet Union
Olympic Games
Bronze medal – third place	1964 Tokyo	Heavyweight

Vadim Mikhaylovich Yemelyanov (Russian: Вадим Михайлович Емельянов, 25 April 1942 – 27 May 1977) was a Soviet heavyweight boxer who won a bronze medal at the 1964 Olympics.

Yemelyanov took up boxing while serving in the Soviet Navy in Leningrad Oblast. He never held a national title, placing second-third in 1961, 1965 and 1967, but was successful internationally, winning the European Cup and the World Army Championships in 1963. At the 1964 Olympics he lost in a semifinal to the eventual winner Joe Frazier. During his career Yemelyanov won 141 of his 158 bouts. He was a career naval officer and after retirement from his boxing career worked as a coach in Severomorsk, where he died in an accident aged 35. Since 1985 an annual boxing tournament has been held there in his honor.

== 1964 Olympic results ==
Below are the results of Vadim Yemelyanov, a heavyweight boxer who competed for the Soviet Union at the 1964 Olympics in Tokyo.

- Round of 16: defeated Wladyslaw Jedrzejewski (Poland) referee stopped contest
- Quarterfinal: defeated Santiago Lovell (Argentina) by knockout
- Semifinal: lost to Joe Frazier (United States) referee stopped contest (was awarded bronze medal)
