= Cleveland Williams =

American professional boxer

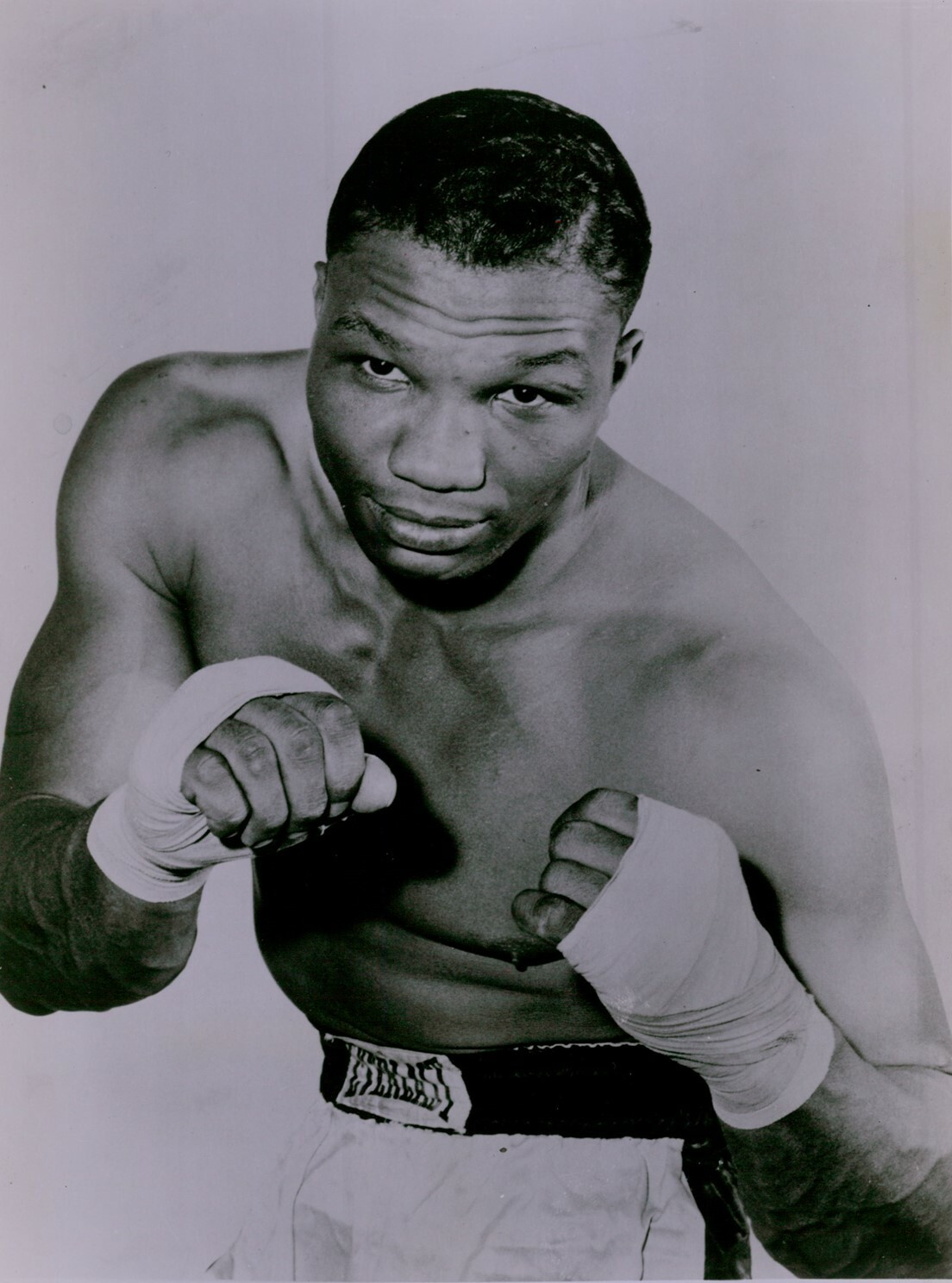
- Williams c. 1960s

Personal information
- Nickname: Big Cat
- Born: June 30, 1933 Griffin, Georgia, U.S.
- Died: September 10, 1999 (aged 66) Houston, Texas, U.S.
- Height: 6 ft 2 in (188 cm)
- Weight: Heavyweight

Boxing career
- Reach: 78 in (198 cm)

Boxing record
- Total fights: 97
- Wins: 82
- Win by KO: 62
- Losses: 13
- Draws: 2

Cleveland "Big Cat" Williams (June 30, 1933 – September 10, 1999) was an American professional boxer. A poll in The Ring magazine rated him as one of the finest boxers never to win a title.

== Early life ==
Born in Griffin, Georgia, Williams started working at a pulpwood mill at the age of 13, and began his professional boxing career in his home state just a year later. He reported winning four of his first six fights, but was barred from competing until he turned 18 after an official learned of his age.

== Early boxing career ==
Williams turned professional in 1951 and fought many of the best heavyweights of his era. During the late 1950s and early 1960s, the 6 ft 2 in Williams was a top-rated heavyweight. His quest to obtain a title fight, however, was consistently derailed. First he was knocked out in the third round by Sonny Liston on April 15, 1959. Williams recovered from the Liston fight to score more wins, but was again stopped by Liston in two rounds in their rematch on March 21, 1960. His quest for the title was later stalled when he was held to a draw by Eddie Machen on July 10, 1962, and when he dropped a split decision on March 13, 1963, to Ernie Terrell, a fighter he had previously knocked out in seven rounds in 1962. During this time frame, he defeated Billy Daniels.

== Police shooting incident ==
On the evening of November 29, 1964, during the height of the civil unrest of the American Civil Rights Movement, a car driven by Williams was stopped near Houston, Texas, by highway Patrolman Dale Witten, who stated afterwards Williams was speeding. According to the police report Williams resisted arrest, and the officer's .357 magnum revolver went off during an ensuing struggle, hitting Williams in the stomach and lodging in his right hip. Williams underwent four operations over the subsequent seven months to address injuries to his colon and right kidney. The right kidney ultimately had to be removed in June 1965. Doctors could not extract the bullet, which had broken his right hip joint and caused partial paralysis of some of the hip's muscles, over 10 feet (3.0 m) of his small intestine had to be removed, and nerve damage affected his left leg above the knee and caused it to atrophy as a result. Hugh Benbow, his manager, and Sonny Liston, former world champion, visited Cleveland Williams in the hospital. After his partial recovery Williams was fined $50 and briefly jailed after pleading no contest to charges arising from the incident. (Patrolman Witten visited Williams to wish him luck the day before his 1966 fight with Muhammad Ali, with both men saying they had "no hard feelings" toward the other).

== Recovery and return to boxing ==
The injury, surgeries and subsequent convalescence caused Williams to lose over 60 pounds (27 kg), and over 17 months of his career. He regained his weight and strength by tossing 80-pound (36 kg) bales of hay daily on a cattle ranch till he had regained his fighting weight and physique. On February 8, 1966, Williams received a standing ovation from the Houston crowd as he returned to the ring, and knocked out Ben Black in the first round.

Williams challenged for the heavyweight championship against Muhammad Ali on November 14, 1966. He was thoroughly outboxed and was knocked down a total of 4 times (3 times in round 2 and once in round 3). The fight was stopped 68 seconds into round 3. Williams retired from boxing after the 1966 Championship defeat, but later made a comeback. Although able to defeat journeymen fighters, he suffered several knockout losses before retiring permanently in 1972.

== Later life ==
The Ring in the 1980s reported he worked as a forklift truck driver in his later years.

== Death ==
On September 3, 1999, Williams was knocked down by a car in a hit and run while walking across a street in Houston, Texas; he died of his injuries at Ben Taub Hospital on September 10, 1999, at the age of 66. Williams was buried in Paradise North Cemetery in Houston.

== Tributes ==
He ended his career with a record of 82 wins (62 KOs), 13 losses and 2 draws. During an interview after his retirement, George Foreman described Williams as having one of the three hardest punches he had experienced professionally, also stating that he and Williams had been sparring partners early in their careers. George Chuvalo also said Williams was one of the hardest punchers he had faced in his own professional career. Williams, aged 38, lost by decision to veteran Chuvalo over 10 rounds at the Astrodome in Houston, Texas, in November 1971. Sonny Liston stated Williams was the hardest puncher he'd ever been in the ring with.

In 2003 Williams was ranked 49th in The Ring's list of 100 greatest punchers of all time.

== Professional boxing record ==
97 fights	82 wins	13 losses
By knockout	62	8
By decision	19	5
By disqualification	1	0
Draws	2	

No.	Result	Record	Opponent	Type	Round, time	Date	Age	Location	Notes
97	Win	82–13–2	Roberto Davila	UD	10	Oct 28, 1973	40 years, 120 days	Denver Coliseum, Denver, Colorado, US	
96	Win	81–13–2	Bob Mashburn	KO	9 (10), 0:51	Jul 10, 1972	39 years, 10 days	Mile High Stadium, Denver, Colorado, US	
95	Win	80–13–2	Terry Daniels	UD	12	May 11, 1972	38 years, 316 days	Memorial Auditorium, Dallas, Texas, US	Won vacant Texas State heavyweight title
94	Loss	79–13–2	George Chuvalo	UD	10	Nov 17, 1971	38 years, 140 days	Astrodome, Houston, Texas, US	
93	Loss	79–12–2	Jack O'Halloran	SD	10	Sep 21, 1971	38 years, 83 days	Houston, Texas, US	
92	Win	79–11–2	Ted Gullick	MD	10	Apr 28, 1971	37 years, 302 days	Arena, Cleveland, Ohio, US	
91	Loss	78–11–2	Alvin Lewis	TKO	4 (10), 2:39	Oct 21, 1970	37 years, 113 days	Cobo Arena, Detroit, Michigan, US	
90	Win	78–10–2	Roberto Davila	UD	10	May 26, 1970	36 years, 330 days	Auditorium, Milwaukee, Wisconsin, US	
89	Win	77–10–2	Eddie Brooks	TKO	1 (12), 2:49	Apr 14, 1970	36 years, 288 days	Auditorium, Milwaukee, Wisconsin, US	
88	Win	76–10–2	Leroy Caldwell	TKO	10 (10)	Dec 9, 1969	36 years, 162 days	Orlando Sports Stadium, Orlando, Florida, US	
87	Loss	75–10–2	Mac Foster	TKO	3 (10), 1:37	Nov 18, 1969	36 years, 141 days	Sam Houston Coliseum, Houston, Texas, US	
86	Loss	75–9–2	Mac Foster	TKO	5 (10), 1:35	Sep 13, 1969	36 years, 75 days	Selland Arena, Fresno, California, US	
85	Loss	75–8–2	Al Jones	TKO	8 (10), 0:11	May 20, 1969	35 years, 324 days	Convention Center, Miami Beach, Florida, US	
84	Win	75–7–2	Charley Polite	UD	10	Mar 18, 1969	35 years, 261 days	Sam Houston Coliseum, Houston, Texas, US	
83	Loss	74–7–2	Bob Cleroux	UD	10	Nov 21, 1968	35 years, 144 days	Forum, Montreal, Quebec, Canada	
82	Win	74–6–2	Moses Harrell	TKO	7 (10), 2:26	Oct 7, 1968	35 years, 99 days	Fort Homer Hesterly Armory, Tampa, Florida, US	
81	Win	73–6–2	Jean Roy	UD	10	Aug 6, 1968	35 years, 37 days	Houston, Texas, US	
80	Win	72–6–2	Leslie Borden	KO	1 (10)	Jun 25, 1968	34 years, 361 days	Sam Houston Coliseum, Houston, Texas, US	
79	Win	71–6–2	Mike Bruce	KO	1 (10), 2:22	Jun 11, 1968	34 years, 347 days	Houston, Texas, US	
78	Win	70–6–2	Roy Crear	KO	1 (10)	May 21, 1968	34 years, 326 days	Sam Houston Coliseum, Houston, Texas, US	
77	Loss	69–6–2	Muhammad Ali	TKO	3 (15), 1:28	Nov 14, 1966	33 years, 137 days	Astrodome, Houston, Texas, US	For WBC, NYSAC, and The Ring heavyweight titles
76	Win	69–5–2	Tod Herring	TKO	3 (10), 0:25	Jun 28, 1966	32 years, 363 days	Sam Houston Coliseum, Houston, Texas, US	
75	Win	68–5–2	Sonny Moore	UD	10	Apr 19, 1966	32 years, 293 days	Sam Houston Coliseum, Houston, Texas, US	
74	Win	67–5–2	Mel Turnbow	UD	10	Mar 22, 1966	32 years, 265 days	Sam Houston Coliseum, Houston, Texas, US	
73	Win	66–5–2	Ben Black	KO	1 (10)	Feb 8, 1966	32 years, 223 days	Sam Houston Coliseum, Houston, Texas, US	
72	Win	65–5–2	Billy Daniels	UD	10	Sep 30, 1964	31 years, 92 days	Sam Houston Coliseum, Houston, Texas, US	
71	Win	64–5–2	Sonny Banks	TKO	6 (10)	Jul 21, 1964	31 years, 21 days	Houston, Texas, US	
70	Win	63–5–2	Tommy Fields	UD	10	Apr 7, 1964	30 years, 282 days	Houston, Texas, US	
69	Win	62–5–2	Roger Rischer	KO	3 (10)	Oct 8, 1963	30 years, 100 days	Sam Houston Coliseum, Houston, Texas, US	
68	Win	61–5–2	Kirk Barrow	KO	3 (10), 2:15	Aug 13, 1963	30 years, 44 days	Sam Houston Coliseum, Houston, Texas, US	
67	Loss	60–5–2	Ernie Terrell	SD	10	Apr 13, 1963	29 years, 287 days	Arena, Philadelphia, Pennsylvania, US	
66	Win	60–4–2	Young Jack Johnson	TKO	10 (10)	Apr 2, 1963	29 years, 276 days	Sam Houston Coliseum, Houston, Texas, US	
65	Win	59–4–2	Billy Daniels	UD	10	Mar 9, 1963	29 years, 252 days	Convention Center, Miami Beach, Florida, US	
64	Win	58–4–2	Dave Bailey	KO	5 (10), 2:56	Oct 23, 1962	29 years, 115 days	Sam Houston Coliseum, Houston, Texas, US	
63	Draw	57–4–2	Eddie Machen	PTS	10	Jul 10, 1962	29 years, 10 days	Sam Houston Coliseum, Houston, Texas, US	
62	Win	57–4–1	Alonzo Johnson	KO	1 (10)	May 15, 1962	28 years, 319 days	Sam Houston Coliseum, Houston, Texas, US	
61	Win	56–4–1	Ernie Terrell	TKO	7 (10), 1:43	Apr 3, 1962	28 years, 277 days	Sam Houston Coliseum, Houston, Texas, US	
60	Win	55–4–1	James Wiley	KO	1 (10)	Dec 19, 1961	28 years, 172 days	Sam Houston Coliseum, Houston, Texas, US	
59	Win	54–4–1	Alex Miteff	TKO	5 (10), 1:32	May 16, 1961	27 years, 320 days	Sam Houston Coliseum, Houston, Texas, US	
58	Win	53–4–1	Wayne Bethea	UD	10	Feb 7, 1961	27 years, 222 days	Houston, Texas, US	
57	Win	52–4–1	Johnny Hayden	KO	2 (10)	Dec 7, 1960	27 years, 160 days	Auditorium, Miami Beach, Florida, US	
56	Win	51–4–1	George Moore	KO	4 (10)	Nov 1, 1960	27 years, 124 days	Houston, Texas, US	
55	Win	50–4–1	Ben Marshall	KO	2 (10)	Oct 24, 1960	27 years, 116 days	Memorial Auditorium, Dallas, Texas, US	
54	Loss	49–4–1	Sonny Liston	TKO	2 (10), 2:13	Mar 21, 1960	26 years, 265 days	Sam Houston Coliseum, Houston, Texas, US	
53	Win	49–3–1	Curley Lee	KO	10 (10), 0:58	Oct 14, 1959	26 years, 106 days	Coliseum, Houston, Texas, US	
52	Win	48–3–1	Ernie Cab	KO	8 (10), 1:05	May 26, 1959	25 years, 330 days	Coliseum, Houston, Texas, US	
51	Loss	47–3–1	Sonny Liston	TKO	3 (10), 2:04	Apr 15, 1959	25 years, 289 days	Auditorium, Miami Beach, Florida, US	
50	Win	47–2–1	Ollie Wilson	KO	3 (10)	Jan 13, 1959	25 years, 197 days	Houston, Texas, US	
49	Win	46–2–1	Howie Turner	PTS	10	Dec 9, 1958	25 years, 162 days	Houston, Texas, US	
48	Win	45–2–1	Frankie Daniels	UD	10	Jun 3, 1958	24 years, 338 days	Houston, Texas, US	
47	Win	44–2–1	Dick Richardson	DQ	4 (10)	Mar 25, 1958	24 years, 268 days	Earls Court Empress Hall, Kensington, London, England, UK	
46	Win	43–2–1	Gene White	TKO	1 (10), 2:38	Feb 4, 1958	24 years, 219 days	Houston, Texas, US	
45	Win	42–2–1	Frankie Daniels	UD	10	Dec 3, 1957	24 years, 156 days	Auditorium, Miami Beach, Florida, US	
44	Win	41–2–1	John Holman	KO	7 (10)	Oct 15, 1957	24 years, 107 days	Houston, Texas, US	
43	Win	40–2–1	Bob Albright	KO	7 (10)	Sep 17, 1957	24 years, 79 days	Houston, Texas, US	
42	Win	39–2–1	Clifford Gray	KO	1 (10)	Jul 23, 1957	24 years, 23 days	Sam Houston Coliseum, Houston, Texas, US	
41	Win	38–2–1	J.D. Marshall	TKO	2 (10), 2:40	Jul 15, 1957	24 years, 15 days	Tyler, Texas, US	
40	Win	37–2–1	Johnny Mason	KO	1 (10)	Jun 11, 1957	23 years, 346 days	Sam Houston Coliseum, Houston, Texas, US	
39	Win	36–2–1	Johnny Hollins	TKO	3 (10)	Aug 6, 1956	23 years, 37 days	City Coliseum, Austin, Texas, US	
38	Loss	35–2–1	Bob Satterfield	KO	3 (10), 1:03	Jun 22, 1954	20 years, 357 days	Auditorium, Miami Beach, Florida, US	
37	Win	35–1–1	Sylvester Jones	KO	6 (10)	Jun 8, 1954	20 years, 343 days	Fort Homer Hesterly Armory, Tampa, Florida, US	
36	Win	34–1–1	Jimmy Walls	TKO	1 (10), 2:43	Mar 9, 1954	20 years, 252 days	Municipal Auditorium, Tampa, Florida, US	
35	Win	33–1–1	Jack Walsh	KO	8 (10)	Nov 10, 1953	20 years, 133 days	Fort Homer Hesterly Armory, Tampa, Florida, US	
34	Win	32–1–1	Bo Willis	KO	2 (10)	Oct 20, 1953	20 years, 112 days	Auditorium, Miami Beach, Florida, US	
33	Win	31–1–1	Claude Rolfe	KO	3 (10), 2:10	Oct 1, 1953	20 years, 93 days	Armory, Charlotte, North Carolina, US	
32	Loss	30–1–1	Sylvester Jones	PTS	4	Sep 24, 1953	20 years, 86 days	Polo Grounds, New York City, New York, US	
31	Win	30–0–1	Keene Simmons	UD	10	Sep 1, 1953	20 years, 63 days	Fort Homer Hesterly Armory, Tampa, Florida, US	
30	Win	29–0–1	Omelio Agramonte	UD	10	May 12, 1953	19 years, 316 days	Fort Homer Hesterly Armory, Tampa, Florida, US	
29	Win	28–0–1	Bob Garner	KO	7 (10)	Mar 31, 1953	19 years, 274 days	Fort Homer Hesterly Armory, Tampa, Florida, US	
28	Win	27–0–1	Ponce de Leon	KO	2 (10)	Mar 24, 1953	19 years, 267 days	Fort Homer Hesterly Armory, Tampa, Florida, US	
27	Win	26–0–1	Terry O'Connor	TKO	3 (8)	Mar 12, 1953	19 years, 255 days	Auditorium, Minneapolis, Minnesota, US	
26	Win	25–0–1	Ponce de Leon	PTS	8	Mar 4, 1953	19 years, 247 days	Miami Stadium, Miami, Florida, US	
25	Win	24–0–1	Abie Gibson	KO	1 (10), 1:22	Jan 13, 1953	19 years, 197 days	Fort Homer Hesterly Armory, Tampa, Florida, US	
24	Win	23–0–1	Graveyard Walters	KO	2 (10)	Dec 8, 1952	19 years, 161 days	Beach Arena, Daytona Beach, Florida, US	
23	Win	22–0–1	Claude Rolfe	KO	9 (10), 1:55	Nov 25, 1952	19 years, 148 days	Municipal Auditorium, Tampa, Florida, US	
22	Win	21–0–1	Johnny Hollins	KO	1 (10), 2:48	Oct 3, 1952	19 years, 95 days	Coliseum Arena, New Orleans, Louisiana, US	
21	Win	20–0–1	Joe McFadden	TKO	3 (6), 2:09	Sep 23, 1952	19 years, 85 days	Municipal Stadium, Philadelphia, Pennsylvania, US	
20	Win	19–0–1	Art Henri	TKO	8 (10), 0:30	Sep 16, 1952	19 years, 78 days	Auditorium, Miami Beach, Florida, US	
19	Win	18–0–1	Roosevelt Holmes	KO	1 (10), 2:10	Sep 12, 1952	19 years, 74 days	Coliseum Arena, New Orleans, Louisiana, US	
18	Win	17–0–1	Baby Booze	KO	1 (6)	Sep 2, 1952	19 years, 64 days	Fort Homer Hesterly Armory, Tampa, Florida, US	
17	Win	16–0–1	Candy McDaniels	KO	2 (10)	Aug 12, 1952	19 years, 43 days	Auditorium, Miami Beach, Florida, US	
16	Win	15–0–1	Sam Harold	KO	4 (6)	Jul 25, 1952	19 years, 25 days	City Auditorium, Macon, Georgia, US	
15	Win	14–0–1	Lee Raymond	TKO	5 (10)	Jul 22, 1952	19 years, 22 days	Auditorium, Miami Beach, Florida, US	
14	Win	13–0–1	Jimmy Felton	KO	3 (8)	Jul 8, 1952	19 years, 8 days	Auditorium, Miami Beach, Florida, US	
13	Win	12–0–1	Eddie Joe Williams	KO	1 (8)	Jun 24, 1952	18 years, 360 days	Daytona Beach, Florida, US	
12	Win	11–0–1	Harry Turner	KO	1 (8)	Jun 17, 1952	18 years, 353 days	Municipal Auditorium, Tampa, Florida, US	
11	Win	10–0–1	Paul Favorite	KO	4 (10)	Jun 10, 1952	18 years, 346 days	Fort Homer Hesterly Armory, Tampa, Florida, US	
10	Win	9–0–1	Ray Brown	KO	3 (6)	May 28, 1952	18 years, 333 days	Auditorium, Miami Beach, Florida, US	
9	Win	8–0–1	Johnny Fowler	KO	5 (6)	Apr 15, 1952	18 years, 290 days	Fort Homer Hesterly Armory, Tampa, Florida, US	
8	Win	7–0–1	Ray Banks	KO	1 (6)	Mar 28, 1952	18 years, 272 days	Coliseum Arena, New Orleans, Louisiana, US	
7	Win	6–0–1	Roosevelt Holmes	UD	6	Feb 29, 1952	18 years, 244 days	Coliseum Arena, New Orleans, Louisiana, US	
6	Win	5–0–1	Rudolph Wood	KO	2 (4)	Feb 26, 1952	18 years, 241 days	Fort Homer Hesterly Armory, Tampa, Florida, US	
5	Win	4–0–1	Ray Banks	TKO	1 (6)	Feb 15, 1952	18 years, 230 days	Coliseum Arena, New Orleans, Louisiana, US	
4	Win	3–0–1	Lee Hunt	KO	2 (4)	Dec 11, 1951	18 years, 164 days	Fort Homer Hesterly Armory, Tampa, Florida, US	
3	Draw	2–0–1	Dan Bolston	PTS	4	Nov 16, 1949	16 years, 139 days	City Auditorium, Macon, Georgia, US	
2	Win	2–0	Phillip Nelson	TKO	3 (4)	Jun 30, 1949	16 years, 0 days	Griffin High School Gym, Griffin, Georgia, US	
1	Win	1–0	Al Williams	TKO	2 (4)	Mar 25, 1949	15 years, 268 days	Griffin High School Gym, Griffin, Georgia, US	
