= Hans Huber (boxer) =

German boxer (1934–2024)

Medal record

Men's Boxing

Representing Germany

Olympic Games
Silver medal – second place	1964 Tokyo	Heavyweight

Hans Huber (1 January 1934 – 12 January 2024) was a German boxer.

Huber competed for Germany in the 1964 Summer Olympics held in Tokyo, Japan, and reached the final but lost to future heavyweight champion of the world Joe Frazier, therefore finishing with a respectable silver medal. He lost a 3–2 decision after besting Abdul Rehman and Giuseppe Ros. Huber died on 12 January 2024, at the age of 90.

== 1964 Olympic results ==
Below are Hans Huber's results from the 1964 Olympic boxing tournament in Tokyo, Japan:

- Round of 16: bye
- Quarterfinal: defeated Abdul Rehman (Pakistan) by knockout
- Semifinal: defeated Giuseppe Ros (Italy) by a 4–1 decision
- Final: lost to Joe Frazier (USA) by a 3–2 decision (was awarded silver medal)

== Sources ==
- Sports-reference
