= Muhammad Ali vs. Jürgen Blin =

Boxing competition

- Date: 26 December 1971
- Venue: Hallenstadion, Zürich, Switzerland

Tale of the tape
| Boxer | (United States) Muhammad Ali | (West Germany) Jürgen Blin |
| Nickname | "The Greatest" | |
| Hometown | Louisville, Kentucky, U.S. | Fehmarn, Schleswig-Holstein, West Germany |
| Purse | $200,000 | $45,000 |
| Pre-fight record | 33–1 (26 KO) | 27–9–6 (6 KO) |
| Age | 29 years, 11 months | 28 years, 8 months |
| Height | 6 ft 3 in (191 cm) | 6 ft 1 in (185 cm) |
| Weight | 220 lb (100 kg) | 198 lb (90 kg) |
| Style | Orthodox | Orthodox |
| Recognition | NABF heavyweight champion Former undisputed heavyweight champion | Former West German heavyweight champion |

Result
- Ali defeated Blin via 7th round KO

Muhammad Ali vs. Jürgen Blin was a professional boxing match contested on 26 December 1971.

== Background ==
Blin entered the bout having had one win since he lost a split decision against European champion Joe Bugner.

== The fight ==
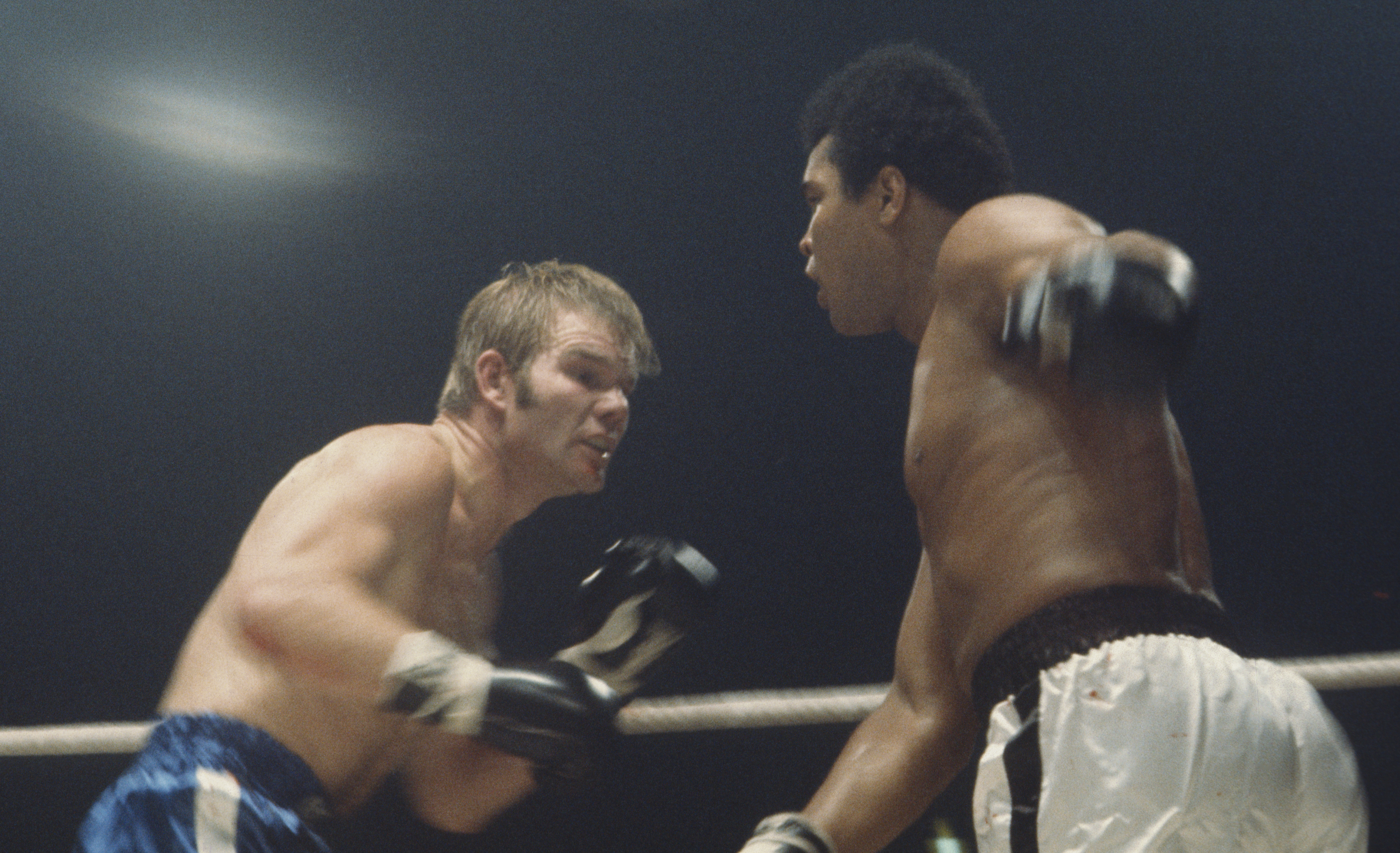
Ali and Blin in action

Ali won the bout through a knockout in the seventh round, the first time Blin had ever been knocked out.

== Undercard ==
Confirmed bouts:

== Broadcasting ==
| Country | Broadcaster |
|---|---|
| Philippines | ABS-CBN |
| United Kingdom | ITV |

| Preceded by vs. Buster Mathis | Muhammad Ali's bouts 26 December 1971 | Succeeded by vs. Mac Foster |
| Preceded by vs. George Johnson | Jürgen Blin's bouts 26 December 1971 | Succeeded by vs. Charles Chase |
