= Jim Robinson (boxer) =

American boxer (born c.1925)

- Born: c. 1925; Kansas City, Missouri, U.S.
- Disappeared: c. 1979
- Occupation: Boxer (retired)
- Known for: Fighting Cassius Clay (Muhammad Ali) in Miami Beach on February 7, 1961

Jim Robinson (born c. 1925 – disappeared c. 1979), known as "Sweet Jimmy", was an American boxer from Miami. Robinson fought Muhammad Ali (at that time still called Cassius Clay) in Miami Beach on February 7, 1961, as a last-minute replacement for Willie Gullatt. Robinson became Ali's fourth professional opponent. His whereabouts after 1979 are unknown.

== Background ==
Originally from Kansas City, Missouri, Robinson was a middleweight boxer who fought up to heavyweight. He was managed by Clyde Killens, a local pool hall owner. He was often used as a last-minute sub on Chris Dundee promotions in Miami-Dade County and was often used as a stepping stone for upcoming South Florida prospects. He trained at the famed 5th Street Gym but lived in the Overtown section of Miami known as Liberty City.

== Bout with Clay/Ali ==
On February 7, 1961, Cassius Clay (later known as Muhammad Ali) was scheduled to fight Willie Gullatt in Miami Beach. According to Gullatt, promoter Chris Dundee, Angelo Dundee's brother, offered Clay $800 and offered Gullatt only $300 for the fight. Gullatt refused and did not show up, instead opting to go out drinking. Dundee then enlisted Robinson to fight Clay. Robinson showed up at Miami Beach Convention Hall with his gear in an old army bag. Clay officially outweighed him by 16.5 pounds and won by knockout at 1:34 of the first round.

Robinson fought for seven more years while compiling a record of 8 wins and 25 losses. He was knocked out 16 times. He retired from boxing in 1963 and became a fixture in local pool halls and street corners in Liberty City. In 1968, he came out of retirement to fight Kent Green in Miami Beach. At that time, Green was the only fighter to have a TKO win over Muhammad Ali (when Ali was an amateur). Green stopped Robinson in under a minute.

== Disappearance ==
In 1979, Sports Illustrated writer/photographer Michael Brennan tracked down Robinson in Miami for what has been his last known interview to date. Robinson claimed that he only weighed 158 lbs. for his fight with Ali (not 178 as was officially listed). He also stated that he was good friends with Ali and would drive him around in Ali's pink Cadillac. He last saw Ali in 1967. Since this interview, Robinson's whereabouts have been unknown. In 2009, ESPN sports writer Wright Thompson wrote an article about his six-year attempt to find Robinson in the Overtown district of Miami with no success.

Ali collector Stephen Singer has spent a number of years searching for Robinson, collecting autographs of 49 of Ali's 50 opponents, with Robinson being the lone omission.

== Professional boxing record ==
8 Wins (3 knockouts, 5 decisions), 25 Losses (16 knockouts, 9 decisions)
Result	Record	Opponent	Type	Round	Date	Location	Notes
Loss	8–25	(United States) Kent Green	TKO	1	10/31/1968	(United States) Miami	
Loss	8–24	(The Bahamas) Richie Smith	PTS	6	07/05/1964	(United States) Little River Auditorium, Miami	
Loss	8–23	(United States) Ray Lavarro	PTS	6	05/05/1964	(United States) North Dade Arena, Opa-locka, Florida	
Loss	8–22	(United States) Willie Johnson	KO	3	09/04/1964	(United States) Little River Auditorium, Miami	
Loss	8–21	(United States) Eddie Agin	KO	3	10/14/1963	(United States) Key West, Florida	
Loss	8–20	(United States) Vince Hepburn	KO	2	03/21/1963	(United States) Little River Auditorium, Miami	
Loss	8–19	(United States) Jack Gilbert	PTS	4	02/25/1963	(United States) North Miami Beach Auditorium, North Miami Beach, Florida	
Loss	8–18	(United States) Andy Mayfield	TKO	4	01/24/1963	(United States) Little River Auditorium, Miami	
Loss	8–17	(United States) Ray Lavarro	UD	6	10/01/1963	(United States) Little River Auditorium, Miami	
Loss	8–16	(The Bahamas) Bobo Reckley	KO	5	11/19/1962	(United States) Miami	
Loss	8–15	(The Bahamas) Bobo Reckley	KO	4	08/11/1962	(United States) Little River Auditorium, Miami	
Loss	8–14	(The Bahamas) Junior Grant	SD	6	06/14/1962	(United States) Little River Auditorium, Miami	
Win	8–13	(United States) Gene Wells	PTS	6	04/28/1962	(United States) Miami Beach Auditorium, Miami Beach, Florida	
Loss	7–13	(United States) Frank Patterson	TKO	4	03/29/1962	(United States) Little River Auditorium, Miami	
Loss	7–12	(United States) Frank Patterson	PTS	4	03/17/1962	(United States) Miami Beach Auditorium, Miami Beach, Florida	
Loss	7–11	(United States) Roger Whitley	KO	2	02/28/1962	(United States) Miami Beach Auditorium, Miami Beach, Florida	
Loss	7–10	(United States) Herb Siler	TKO	5	08/02/1962	(United States) Little River Auditorium, Miami	
Loss	7–9	(United States) Jim Tillman	PTS	4	11/01/1962	(United States) Little River Auditorium, Miami	
Loss	7–8	(United States) Jim McNeil	PTS	6	11/13/1961	(United States) Little River Auditorium, Miami	
Win	7–7	Tommy Lee	PTS	6	06/11/1961	(United States) Little River Auditorium, Miami	
Win	6–7	Tom Cox	KO	1	10/17/1961	(United States) Cutler Ridge, Miami	
Win	5–7	(United States) Tiger Lee Flowers	PTS	4	09/10/1961	(United States) Sir John Club, Miami	
Win	4–7	(United States) Jim Tillman	SD	6	09/25/1961	(United States) Sir John Club, Miami	
Loss	3–7	(United States) Al Owens	KO	5	09/18/1961	(United States) Sir John Club, Miami	
Win	3–6	Ted Jones	KO	3	11/09/1961	(United States) Sir John Club, Miami	Jones knocked out at 1:50 of the third round.
Win	2–6	(United States) Willie Johnson	UD	6	07/09/1961	(United States) Little River Auditorium, Miami	
Loss	1–6	(United States) Joe Moss	TKO	5	07/17/1961	(United States) Sir John Club, Miami	
Loss	1–5	(The Bahamas) Yama Bahama	KO	6	02/06/1961	(The Bahamas) Nassau, Bahamas	
Loss	1–4	(United States) Claude Williams	KO	1	04/14/1961	(United States) Winter Haven, Florida	
Loss	1–3	(United States) Cassius Clay	KO	1	07/02/1961	(United States) Miami Beach Auditorium, Miami Beach, Florida	Jim knocked out at 1:34 of the first round.
Loss	1–2	(United States) Al Owens	PTS	4	08/11/1960	(United States) North Miami, Florida	
Loss	1–1	(Jamaica) Allan Harmon	KO	3	10/13/1960	(United States) Key West, Florida	
Win	1–0	Willie Johnson	TKO	3	06/13/1960	(United States) Palace Arena, Miami	
