= Cassius Clay vs. Herb Siler =

1960 boxing match

- Date: December 27, 1960
- Venue: Miami Beach Auditorium, Miami Beach, Florida

Tale of the tape
Boxer	(United States) Cassius Clay	(United States) Herb Siler
Nickname	"The Louisville Lip"	"Gorilla"
Hometown	Louisville, Kentucky	Brundidge, Alabama
Pre-fight record	1–0 (0 KO)	5–1 (2 KO)
Age	18 years, 11 months	25 years, 11 months
Height	6 ft 3 in (191 cm)	6 ft 0 in (183 cm)
Weight	193 lb (88 kg)	191 lb (87 kg)
Style	Orthodox	Orthodox
Recognition	1960 Olympic light heavyweight Gold Medallist	

Result
- Clay won by TKO in the 4th round (1:00)

Cassius Clay vs. Herb Siler was a professional boxing match contested on December 27, 1960. It was the second professional bout of Clay, later known as Muhammad Ali.

== Background ==
The fight took place soon after Clay had joined the 5th Street Gym and was as such the first fight where his long time trainer Angelo Dundee was in his corner.

It was part of the undercard for Willie Pastrano vs. Jesse Bowdry.

== The fight ==
Clay won the bout through a technical knockout after the referee stopped the fight in the fourth round. He was ahead on the referee and both judges' cards at the time of the stoppage.

== Undercard ==
Confirmed bouts:

Preceded by vs. Tunney Hunsaker	Cassius Clay's bouts 27 December 1960	Succeeded by vs. Tony Esperti
Preceded by vs. Tommy Stru	Herb Siler's bouts 27 December 1960	Succeeded by vs. Tony Hughes
