= Herb Siler =

American boxer (1935–2001)

Personal information
- Nickname: Gorilla
- Nationality: American
- Born: January 5, 1935 Brundidge, Alabama, U.S.
- Died: March 25, 2001 (aged 66) Miami, Florida, U.S.
- Height: 6 ft 0 in (183 cm)
- Weight: Heavyweight

Boxing career
- Stance: Orthodox

Boxing record
- Total fights: 32
- Wins: 20
- Win by KO: 9
- Losses: 12

Herb Siler (January 5, 1935, Brundidge, Alabama, United States – March 25, 2001, Miami) was a heavyweight boxer. He won 16 fights (including seven by knockout) and lost 12, with no draws.

== Professional career ==
His career started in 1960 and ended in 1967. Siler lost to Muhammad Ali through a 4th-round knockout in 1960.

== Personal life ==
In 1972, he was convicted of manslaughter and subsequently served a 7-year sentence. His grandson is NFL linebacker Brandon Siler.

== Professional boxing record ==
32 fights	20 wins	12 losses
By knockout	9	8
By decision	11	4

Key to abbreviations used for results
DQ	Disqualification	RTD	Corner retirement
KO	Knockout	SD	Split decision / split draw
MD	Majority decision / majority draw	TD	Technical decision / technical draw
NC	No contest	TKO	Technical knockout
PTS	Points decision	UD	Unanimous decision / unanimous draw

Boxing record
No.	Result	Record	Opponent	Type	Round(s), time	Date	Location	Notes
32	Loss	20–12	(United States) Moses Harrell	UD	6	May 3, 1967	(United States) Dade County Armory, Miami, Florida	
31	Loss	20–11	(United States) Jefferson Davis	TKO	3 (10)	May 3, 1966	(United States) Sam Houston Coliseum, Houston, Texas	
30	Loss	20–10	(Italy) Franco De Piccoli	KO	2 (10)	Jan 23, 1965	(Italy) Palasport di San Siro, Milan, Lombardy	
29	Loss	20–9	(Peru) Roberto Davila	KO	4 (10)	Sep 11, 1963	(Peru) Estadio Nacional, Lima	
28	Loss	20–8	(Germany) Willi Besmanoff	TKO	4 (10), 2:28	Jul 5, 1963	(United States) Jacksonville Beach Baseball Park, Jacksonville Beach, Florida	
27	Loss	20–7	(United States) Ernie Terrell	TKO	3 (10)	Mar 7, 1963	(United States) Little River Auditorium, Miami, Florida	
26	Win	20–6	(United States) Jim Tillman	PTS	8	Feb 25, 1963	(United States) Jacksonville Coliseum, Jacksonville, Florida	
25	Win	19–6	(United States) Johnny Thomas	KO	2 (6)	Feb 21, 1963	(United States) Little River Auditorium, Miami, Florida	
24	Win	18–6	(United States) Willie Gulatt	PTS	6	Nov 15, 1962	(United States) Miami Beach Auditorium, Miami Beach, Florida	
23	Loss	17–6	(United States) Ollie Wilson	TKO	4 (8)	Aug 9, 1962	(United States) Little River Auditorium, Miami, Florida	For Florida heavyweight title
22	Loss	17–5	(United States) Willie Gulatt	SD	8	Jun 14, 1962	(United States) Little River Auditorium, Miami, Florida	
21	Win	17–4	(United States) Nick Scott	KO	2 (?)	Apr 19, 1962	(United States) Little River Auditorium, Miami, Florida	
20	Loss	16–4	(United States) Ernie Terrell	PTS	10	Feb 28, 1962	(United States) Miami Beach Auditorium, Miami Beach, Florida	
19	Win	16–3	(United States) Jim Robinson	TKO	5 (8)	Feb 8, 1962	(United States) Little River Auditorium, Miami, Florida	
18	Win	15–3	(United States) Johnny Gould	UD	8	Jan 18, 1962	(United States) Little River Auditorium, Miami, Florida	
17	Win	14–3	(United States) Carlos Dunston	TKO	3 (4)	Dec 30, 1961	(United States) Little River Auditorium, Miami, Florida	
16	Win	13–3	(United States) Willie Gulatt	TKO	6 (8), 1:38	Oct 16, 1961	(United States) Sir John Club, Miami, Florida	
15	Win	12–3	(United States) Jim Tillman	PTS	6	Oct 10, 1961	(United States) Cutler Ridge, Miami, Florida	
14	Win	11–3	(United States) Aaron Beasley	TKO	1 (8), 0:58	Sep 21, 1961	(United States) Little River Auditorium, Miami, Florida	
13	Win	10–3	(United States) Willie Johnson	UD	6	Sep 14, 1961	(United States) Miami Beach Auditorium, Miami Beach, Florida	
12	Win	9–3	(The Bahamas) Wendell Newton	PTS	6	Jun 14, 1961	(United States) Miami Beach Auditorium, Miami Beach, Florida	
11	Win	8–3	(United States) Roosevelt Luggins	TKO	5 (6)	May 29, 1961	(United States) Sir John Club, Miami, Florida	
10	Win	7–3	(The Bahamas) Wendell Newton	PTS	6	May 15, 1961	(United States) Sir John Club, Miami, Florida	
9	Win	6–3	(United States) Tommy Stru	PTS	6	Apr 1, 1961	(United States) Miami Beach Auditorium, Miami Beach, Florida	
8	Loss	5–3	(United States) Tony Hughes	PTS	4	Mar 13, 1961	(United States) Miami Beach Auditorium, Miami Beach, Florida	
7	Loss	5–2	(United States) Cassius Clay	TKO	4	Dec 27, 1960	(United States) Miami Beach Auditorium, Miami Beach, Florida	
6	Win	5–1	(United States) Tommy Stru	SD	6	Oct 26, 1960	(United States) Miami Beach Auditorium, Miami Beach, Florida	
5	Win	4–1	(United States) Jim Tillman	SD	6	Oct 22, 1960	(United States) Palace Arena, Miami, Florida	
4	Win	3–1	(United States) Jim Robinson	TKO	3 (4)	Sep 26, 1960	(United States) Palace Arena, Miami, Florida	
3	Loss	2–1	(United States) Tony Alongi	TKO	4 (6)	Jun 7, 1960	(United States) Miami Beach Auditorium, Miami Beach, Florida	
2	Win	2–0	(United States) Jim Tillman	TKO	3 (4)	May 23, 1960	(United States) Palace Arena, Miami, Florida	
1	Win	1–0	(United States) Harold Brown	UD	4	Apr 25, 1960	(United States) Palace Arena, Miami, Florida	Professional debut
