= Moe Fleischer =

American boxing trainer, matchmaker, and promoter (1901–1987)

- Born: Moe Fleischer; 1901; New York, U.S.
- Died: July 10, 1987 (aged 85–86); Manhattan, New York, U.S.
- Other name: Sellout Moe
- Occupations: Matchmaker; Boxing promoter Boxing trainer
- Family: Nat Fleischer

Moe Fleischer (1901 – July 10, 1987) was an American boxing trainer, matchmaker, and promoter who was involved in boxing for 70 years.

== Early life ==
Moe Fleischer was born in New York, United States, in the early 1900s. He grew up on the East Side of New York.

His brother was Nat Fleischer, founder and editor-in-chief of The Ring Magazine.

== Career ==
Fleischer's professional boxing record stood at one loss and one draw before he turned to training, managing, matchmaking, and promoting.

By 1926, the native New Yorker had officially entered the business of boxing. He promoted a show at Brooklyn's Broadway Arena in 1928, featuring Allie Ridgeway and Willie Greenspan.

He helped develop the careers of many fighters. He trained New Zealand boxer Tom Heeney for a championship bout in 1928 against heavyweight champion Gene Tunney. He also had been Eladio Valdés's trainer, had set up fights for Panama Al Brown, Abe Attell, and Tony Canzoneri, and had worked with Joe Gans, Harry Greb, Battling Levinsky, and Benny Leonard.

During the 1930s, he trained Cuban boxer Kid Chocolate. Fleischer recalled how the fighter, new to New York from Cuba, prayed in his corner before every fight. Fleischer said, "He was fighting this guy who was a real quick starter. I warned Chocolate the guy would come out fast, but before he got all the way up from praying the bell rang, this guy charged across the ring and hit him with a right hand that knocked him down." Seeing his fighter in trouble, he reacted quickly. "I thought this might be the end of his career, so I got up on the apron and reached into the ring. I had a capsule of smelling salts hidden in my hand. The ringside judge asked what I was doing, and I said I saw some cotton on the canvas that I didn't want Chocolate to trip over. I stuck the salts under his nose, and he beat the count. He didn't know where he was for five rounds, but he finally shook it off and managed a draw. It saved his career." In the summer of 1931, Fleischer brought the Cuban boxer to Philadelphia to fight titleholder Benny Bass. Under Fleischer's tutelage, Kid Chocolate became Cuba's first world champion, retaining the title for more than two years.

Fleischer became a professional boxing matchmaker in 1944. He replaced Charlie Bennet at the Bergenfield Skating Arena in 1946. By that time, Fleischer was promoting fights full-time. He ran eight clubs all over New York, including Ridgewood Grove, Eastern Parkway, St. Nicholas, Queensboro, Long Beach, Newark, Broadway, and Westchester. His best club was Brooklyn's Ridgewood Grove Arena, dubbed the 'Cradle of the Champions,' where he developed Sandy Saddler, Rocky Graziano, and Roland La Starza. At Ridgewood Grove, he earned the nickname "Sellout Moe." He staged 23 consecutive fights at the 4,000-seat venue in which all the tickets were sold out in advance.

In the early 1950s, Fleischer was promoting shows at three different fight clubs in a single week.

By 1957, Moe Fleischer went to work at New York's main post office. When boxing began airing free on TV four nights a week, fight clubs saw a drop in attendance. By 1969, most of his old fight clubs were supermarkets.

The last fight he promoted in New York was the 1959 Floyd Patterson vs. Ingemar Johansson heavyweight title bout at Yankee Stadium. Johansson won with a third-round knockout.

After his wife of 47 years, Lily, passed in 1966, he considered retiring. He was urged by Chris Dundee, one of the most active fight promoters in the country, to relocate to Miami, Florida. Moving to Miami Beach in the 1960s, he remained active in boxing with Dundee, a friend since the late 1940s. His work in the Dundee stable centered on developing young boxers. He served as an assistant promoter in 1969, operating from the Dundee office at the Miami Beach Auditorium. That year, he travelled to Oranjestad, Aruba with Frank "Parson" Jones, who knocked out Ireno Werleman in the fourth round.

In the 20 years before his death, he was a fixture at the famed 5th Street Gym, managing and training fighters. Around 1973, he began training Bahamian Elisha Obed. Fleischer said he liked Obed because he reminded him of Kid Chocolate. During the 1970s, Fleischer guided him to a 60-0-1 record and big fights at the Miami Beach Convention Center. In 1975, the 74 year old promoter told the Miami Herald sports writer, "You should see his fights in Nassau. He's like Muhammad Ali... all the people jump into the ring after his fights... 200, 300 of 'em." That year, he helped Obed land the world junior lightweight title, the first for any Bahamian boxer. The 27-year-old middleweight won the WBC junior middleweight championship on November 13, 1975. Fleischer received a share of Obed's purses, though Mike Dundee, son of Chris Dundee and nephew of Angelo Dundee, managed him.

In 1979, Fleischer reflected, "I built the kids up. That's the trouble with a lot of promoters today. They don't know how to build kids up. They destroy them putting them in over their heads. That's why the game's not as good as it used to be years ago."

He was 80 years old in 1982 when he trained junior-middleweight Kenny Whetstone at the Fifth Street Gym.

== Death ==
Moe Fleischer died from heart failure at the age of 86 on July 10, 1987, in Miami Beach, Florida, United States.

== Legacy ==
Following his death, boxing historian Hank Kaplan said, "The fight game has lost a great one. Moe's success in the sport didn't let him affect how he treated people. No matter what mood he was in, he always had a smile. Once you met him, you couldn't forget that chubby face and big cigar."

In 2014, he was inducted into the Florida Boxing Hall of Fame.
