= Standing eight =

Standing eight may refer to:

- An aerobatic maneuver
- Standing eight count in boxing
