= Chris Dundee =

American boxing manager and fight promoter (1908–1998)

- Born: Cristofo Mirena; February 23, 1908; Philadelphia, Pennsylvania, US
- Died: November 16, 1998 (aged 90); Miami, Florida, US
- Occupations: Boxing manager Boxing promoter

Chris Dundee (born Cristofo Mirena; February 23, 1908 – November 16, 1998) was an Italian-American boxing manager and fight promoter for 63 years. He was an older brother of Angelo Dundee.

== Early life ==
Cristofo (Christopher) Mirena was born on February 23, 1908, in South Philadelphia, Pennsylvania, United States. He was the second eldest son of Philomena and Angelo Mirenda who had 11 children.

As a young boy, he sold candy and newspapers on trains running from Philadelphia to New York. Dundee dropped out of school and left home at 13. He later worked for a streetcar company alongside Frank Palermo, who became known as an associate of the Philadelphia crime family.

He changed his last name to Dundee as a teenager, following the lead of his older brother, Joe, who had taken the name of their boxing hero Johnny Dundee. To avoid revealing his boxing career to his parents, Joe adopted the name Dundee.

== Career ==
Inspired by his older brother, a South Philadelphia club fighter, he entered boxing in 1926. Chris Dundee started managing and promoting boxers in 1928. Flyweight Midget Wolgast was his first world champion, whom he managed in 1930. Between 1932 and 1950, he promoted fights in Richmond, Washington, and New York.

He moved to Norfolk, Virginia, in 1932, discovering Ken Overlin. Overlin became world middleweight champion in 1940, giving Dundee his first national exposure. His stable of fighters in Norfolk included Phil Furr, Izzy Jannazzo, Irish Jimmy Webb, and Jimmy Bell. Shortly after World War II, he pulled out of Norfolk.

His brothers joined him in the boxing business after returning from the war in the mid-1940s. Angelo went to work for Chris in 1947, sleeping in his office at the Capital Hotel in New York.

His entry into South Florida boxing began in 1946 with two shows at the Coral Gables Coliseum (now Miami Coliseum).

He managed American boxer Georgie Abrams until his last fight in 1948. Dundee also managed Ezzard Charles, world heavyweight champion in the 1950s. Dundee helped Charles claim a historic world title victory over Joe Louis in 1950.

=== Miami Beach Auditorium ===
In 1950, he moved from Philadelphia and established a headquarters in Miami Beach to make matches and promote boxing. That year, he began staging Tuesday night boxing cards at the old Miami Beach Auditorium (Jackie Gleason Theater), where he held exclusive promotional rights of boxing and wrestling. His cubicle in the auditorium had two desks, two telephones, and a wall covered in pictures.

=== 5th Street Gym ===
Chris Dundee opened the 5th Street Gym in 1951 in Miami Beach, Florida. Less than two miles from the auditorium, he turned the second floor of 501 Washington Ave into a gymnasium. The gym had a bare plywood floor, one ring, a few heavy bags, a light bag, and rubbing tables.

Dundee promoted 43 boxing events at the Miami Beach Auditorium in 1955 and arranged fights in Cuba, selling tickets with airfare and hotel accommodations in Havana. By 1957, he had promoted 256 fights since 1950 and was making more than $20,000 a year, becoming one of two U.S. promoters with a consistent weekly program. Dundee credited James D. Norris of the International Boxing Club for "saving Beach boxing" by assigning 23 televised bouts to the venue.

His younger brother Angelo moved to Miami after spending four years in New York. Angelo handled the development, training, and management of most talent on Chris's weekly cards.

=== General Manager of Ali ===
Chris Dundee negotiated a deal with businessmen from Louisville to bring Muhammad Ali, then Cassius Clay, to train and fight in Miami. In the winter of 1960, Ali started training at Dundee's 5th Street Gym. In the 1960s, the Miami Beach boxing promoter became the general manager of Muhammad Ali.

In 1961, Dundee promoted Floyd Patterson vs. Ingemar Johansson III held at the Convention Center. He would also promote Sonny Liston vs. Cassius Clay, held at the 8,000-seat Miami Beach Convention Hall on February 25, 1964. The no. 1 contender, Ali, won the world heavyweight title with a knockout. The fight drew Miami into the national spotlight for boxing. At the time, Dundee had promoted close to 400 shows, including 50 nationally televised cards.

Chris Dundee convinced American trainer and matchmaker Moe Fleischer to relocate to Miami, Florida and join him in the 1960s.

For years, Dundee's successful wrestling events kept him afloat as a boxing promoter. In 1967, he promoted 34 boxing events in Miami Beach.

When Jack Kent Cooke, then owner of the Los Angeles Lakers, and entertainment mogul Jerry Perenchio sponsored the "Fight of the Century" in 1971. The fight was sold, and broadcast by closed circuit. Dundee, the long-time boxing promoter, secured the Miami-area closed-circuit rights from Chartwell Artists Inc.

In the 1970s, Elisha Obed, the junior middleweight world champion, was under Dundee's management. By the late 1970s, Dundee was Miami's leading boxing promoter. Dundee, alongside Madison Square Garden, co-promoted South Africa's Kallie Knoetze, the second-ranked heavyweight in the WBA, for his U.S. debut.

In January 1972, the Miami Beach City Council denied Dundee's request for a 5-year extension to his exclusive boxing and wrestling contract at the Miami Beach Auditorium. His contract expired on November 30 and he was replaced as the venue's promoter after 21 years, with Mel Ziegler outbidding him for the exclusive license. He and his brother rented office space in a Miami Beach bank building but continued handling bookings for Ali, wrestlers, and the 5th Street Gym.

After losing his license, he toured through Canada, Europe, and the Caribbean, as general manager and financial coordinator for Muhammad Ali.

In the mid-1970s, the Miami Beach Auditorium closed and Dundee moved his cards to the Miami Beach Convention Center.

He recovered from throat cancer around 1978 after undergoing 34 cobalt treatments and resumed promoting a wide range of events. He even staged wrestling and boxing events on a barge until Dusty Rhodes fell into Biscayne Bay.

Dundee later sold the once-famed 5th Street Gym to promoter Felix "Tutu" Zabala in 1982 but remained as its operator. He had been forced to make the sale and scale back his fight promotions in Miami.

In the 1970s and 1980s, Chris Dundee Enterprises promoted Championship Wrestling from Florida at the city's convention center. Dundee, who had promoted pro wrestling on Miami Beach since 1951, began to gross over $300,000-$400,000 a year from wrestling by 1977. Among his local promotions was an April 7, 1976, exhibition at Miami-Dade Community College's North Campus featuring Dusty Rhodes. After the show, a fan filed a lawsuit alleging assault by Rhodes, naming Dundee as a co-defendant.

As Ray Minus's sponsor, Dundee played a key role in his 1989 and 1990 title defenses and traveled with the Commonwealth bantamweight champion to Glasgow's Bellahouston Sports Centre in June 1989.

Dundee remained active in boxing until he suffered a stroke in January 1990 at 83 years old. The stroke struck as he drove to a dinner in Miami Beach, causing him to veer off the road. It affected the left side of his brain, impairing his speech and mobility.

Dundee's iconic 5th Street Gym was torn down in 1993.

== Personal life ==
Chris Dundee was among the four older brothers of the famous trainer Angelo Dundee, who was 15 years younger. In the 1940s, he and his wife, Geraldine Dundee, had a son Michael, and a daughter, Suzanne Dundee Bonner.

== Death ==
Chris Dundee died on November 16, 1998, in Miami, Florida, U.S. He died at the Miami Jewish Home at 90 years old.

== Legacy ==
Dundee promoted eight world championship fights, managed nearly 300 fighters, and staged more than 1000 bouts over four decades. Among the renowned boxers Dundee promoted were George Foreman, Sugar Ray Robinson, Archie Moore, Jake LaMotta, Sugar Ray Leonard, Kid Gavilan, and Ezzard Charles.

Chris Dundee was inducted into the International Boxing Hall of Fame in 1994.

His leather Everlast portfolio is preserved in the Smithsonian National Museum of African American History and Culture.
