= Cassius Clay vs. Tony Esperti =

1961 boxing match

- Date: January 17, 1961
- Venue: Miami Beach Auditorium, Miami Beach, Florida

Tale of the tape
Boxer	(United States) Cassius Clay	(United States) Tony Esperti
Nickname	"The Louisville Lip"	"Big Tony"
Hometown	Louisville, Kentucky	Baltimore, Maryland
Pre-fight record	2–0 (1 KO)	9–5–2 (5 KO)
Age	19 years	Unknown
Height	6 ft 3 in (191 cm)	6 ft 3 in (191 cm)
Weight	195 lb (88 kg)	197 lb (89 kg)
Style	Orthodox	Orthodox
Recognition	1960 Olympic light heavyweight Gold Medallist	

Result
- Clay won by TKO in 3rd round (1:30)

Cassius Clay vs. Tony Esperti was a professional boxing match contested on January 17, 1961.

== Background ==
The fight took place on Clay's 19th birthday and was part of the undercard to Gomeo Brennan vs. Cecil Shorts. Esperti was making his first appearance inside the ring in 6 years.

== The fight ==
Clay won the bout through a technical knockout when the referee stopped the fight in the third round after Esparti's left eye had been cut by Clay's jabs.

== Aftermath ==
Esperti was later convicted of first degree murder for gunning down mafia boss Thomas Altamura, a member of the Gambino crime family.

== Undercard ==
Confirmed bouts:

Preceded by vs. Herb Siler	Cassius Clay's bouts 17 January 1961	Succeeded by vs. Jim Robinson
Preceded by vs. Al Anderson	Tony Esperti's bouts 17 January 1961	Succeeded by vs. JW DeBoe
