= Broadway Arena =

Former arena in Brooklyn, New York

- "B'way Arena" "The Broadway"
- Interactive map of Broadway Arena
- Full name: Broadway Arena
- Former names: Broadway Sporting Club (1914-1921); Broadway Exhibition Association (1921-1925); Broadway Arena (1925-1952)
- Address: 930-944 Halsey Street; Brooklyn, New York; United States
- Coordinates: 40°41′7″N 73°54′58″W
- Capacity: 4,500
- Type: Boxing arena; Wrestling arena; Basketball arena

Construction
- Opened: 1914
- Closed: 1952

Broadway Arena, formerly known as the Broadway Sporting Club and Broadway Exhibition Association, was an indoor arena located in Brooklyn, New York, United States. It opened in 1914 and had a seating capacity of 4,500 for boxing and wrestling.

== History ==
The Broadway Sporting Club was established and operated by John Weismantel, who served as president of the organization. It was situated in the Bedford–Stuyvesant neighborhood of Brooklyn, at Halsey Street near Broadway and the Halsey Street station on the elevated rapid transit line.

The clubhouse, finished in 1914, was purpose-built for boxing under the Frawley Law and cost about $100,000. It measured 100 by 160 feet, stood one storey high with a hip roof, and was well ventilated and heated by 40 steam radiators. The entrance, placed between two Halsey Street storefronts, led to 1,600 box seats and bleachers on all sides holding 1,500 more. The ring measured 16 feet 6 inches. John Weismantel introduced a notable innovation: a tunnel connecting the dressing rooms to the ring, allowing boxers to enter and exit without navigating through the crowd and causing disruption. The venue featured ticket offices on both sides of the main entrance, with the club's office adjacent to the right-side window, followed by a bathroom with shower facilities and a room for the boxers. Large dressing rooms were located below, with a runway leading to the stage.

=== Boxing ===
The Broadway Sporting Club debuted with its first boxing program on February 3, 1914. The card featured Soldier Kearns and Sailor Fred Fritts as the inaugural main event in a ten-round bout officiated by referee Johnny Haukop. Following a successful launch, the club went after major bouts justified by its modern equipment and capacity of over 3,000 seats. Weismantel viewed only Madison Square Garden as big enough to outbid him.

The venue at Halsey Street, near Broadway, hosted many old-time boxing greats such as Kid Williams, Lew Tendler, Battling Levinsky, Eddie Martin, Jack Britton, and André Routis, among others. One of the biggest upsets at the arena was in April 1914, when world middleweight champion George Chip was defeated by Brownsville's Al McCoy, who struck early with a left hook and ended Chip's reign.

The venue was briefly known as the Broadway Exhibition Association (or Broadway Association arena) during the early 1920s.

From 1925 to 1929, promoter Ben Feinberg operated the "New" Broadway Arena, where he, along with various matchmakers including Tom McArdle and Andy Niederreiter, staged new talent shows. Feinberg personally financed and supervised major upgrades to the venue, including the addition of a balcony, facilitating a name change, and expanding the venue's overall capacity to nearly 5,000.

Tony Canzoneri, a future world champion, had his breakthrough at Broadway Arena in 1925.

After Ben Feinberg lost Johnny Attell's services in 1928, Brooklyn's Tony Martello filled in as matchmaker, and he went on to have a successful season. Martello was formally appointed matchmaker at Broadway Arena in March 1929, succeeding Johnny Attell, following financial losses experienced by Feinberg.

The New York State Boxing Commission ordered the Broadway Arena's last show of the 1929 season's first half to take place on May 13, 1929, before suspending Feinberg's arena indefinitely for unsanitary conditions and lack of floorwalkers.

In 1935, the Broadway Arena was taken over by new owners who renovated and repainted the facility, setting October 1, 1935, as the reopening date. The month before, Max Joss, a Williamsburg man who had pioneered National Guard boxing, took over matchmaking duties at the arena. Joss went on to operate the arena for 17 years.

Abe Yager worked as press agent and promoted the club's shows for 15 years.

Max Joss withdrew in 1951 under pressure from television's impact on boxing shows. Moe Fleischer became matchmaker and promoter in October 1951 and briefly reopened the venue without television revenue, confident that strong matchups and the right pricing would appeal to boxing fans.

=== Basketball ===
The arena, "Brooklyn's Madison Square Garden," underwent reconstruction to make it ideal for basketball, featuring a regulation-size court and seating designed to provide unobstructed views from every section. The newly renovated Broadway Arena debuted as a basketball venue on October 23, 1929, with its first game featuring the New York Original Celtics against Brownsville.

== Closure ==
The arena appears to have hosted its final boxing program on November 29, 1951. The Broadway Arena continued hosting wrestling matches until early 1952 under promoter Abe Halfon, before the venue closed.

In December 1952, the Broadway Arena, then one of America's oldest fight clubs, was converted into a warehouse, and later a supermarket.

The Saratoga Square housing complex was completed on the site in November 1980.
