= Cassius Clay vs. Lamar Clark =

1961 boxing match

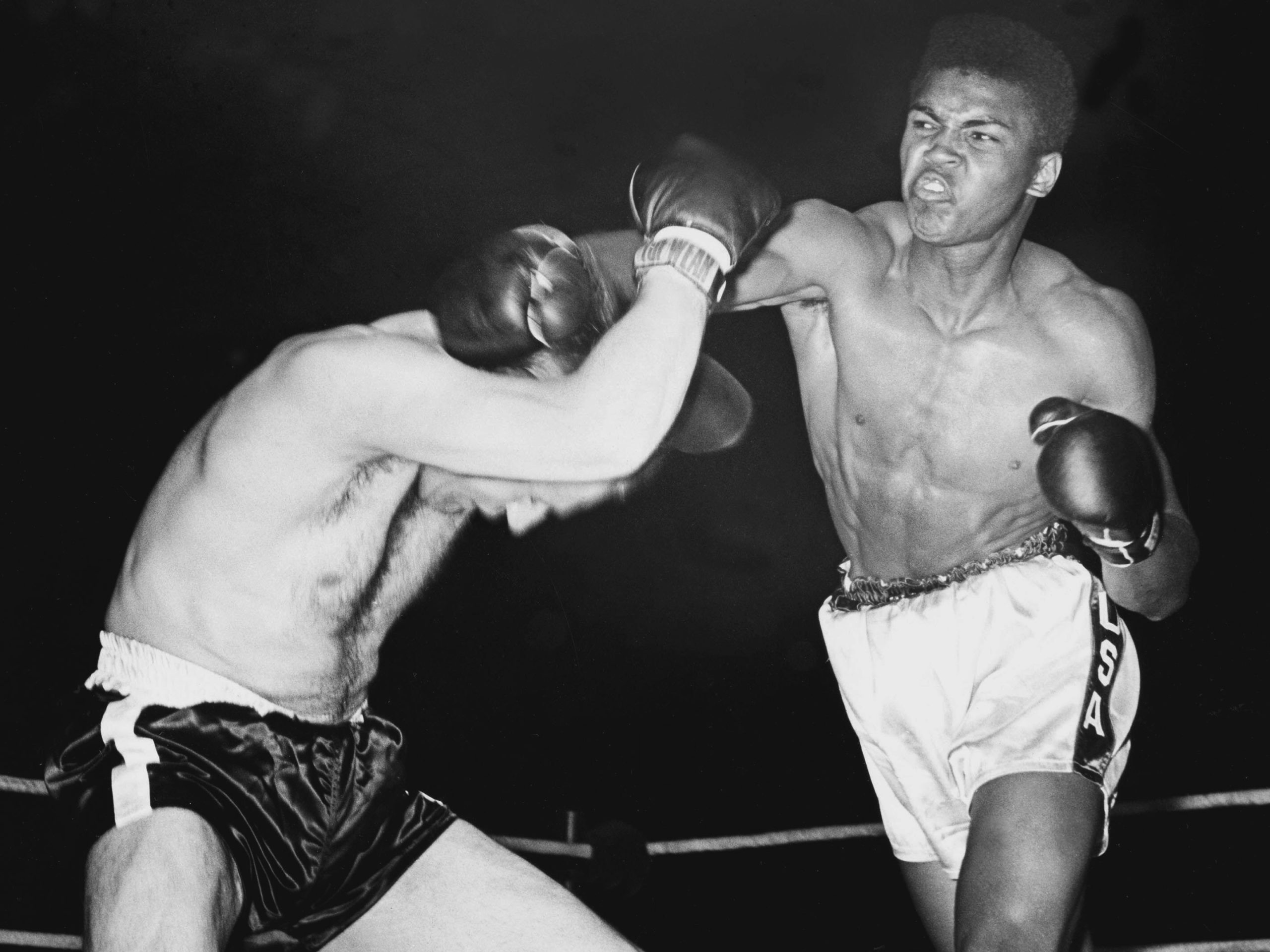
- Date: April 19, 1961
- Venue: Freedom Hall, Louisville, Kentucky

Tale of the tape
Boxer	(United States) Cassius Clay	(United States) LaMar Clark
Nickname	"The Louisville Lip"	
Hometown	Louisville, Kentucky	Cedar City, Utah
Pre-fight record	5–0 (4 KO)	43–2 (42 KO)
Age	19 years, 3 months	27 years, 4 months
Height	6 ft 3 in (191 cm)	5 ft 10 in (178 cm)
Weight	192 lb (87 kg)	181 lb (82 kg)
Style	Orthodox	Orthodox
Recognition	1960 Olympic light heavyweight Gold Medallist	

Result
- Clay won by KO in 2nd round (1:27)

Cassius Clay vs. LaMar Clark was a professional boxing match contested on April 19, 1961.

== Background ==
Clark entered the ring with a reputation of knocking out 42 of his previous 45 opponents.

== The fight ==
Clay broke Clark's nose in the fight and won the bout through a knockout in the second round.

== Aftermath ==
Following the bout, Clark retired from boxing.

== Undercard ==
Confirmed bouts:

Preceded by vs. Donnie Fleeman	Cassius Clay's bouts 19 April 1961	Succeeded by vs. Duke Sabedong
Preceded by vs. Chuck Wilburn	Lamar Clark's bouts 19 April 1961	Retired
