= Cassius Clay vs. Jim Robinson =

1961 boxing match

Tale of the tape
| Boxer | (United States) Cassius Clay | (United States) Jim Robinson |
| Nickname | "The Louisville Lip" | "Sweet Jimmy" |
| Hometown | Louisville, Kentucky | Kansas City, Missouri |
| Pre-fight record | 3–0 (2 KO) | 6–6–2 (4 KO) |
| Age | 19 years | 35–36 |
| Height | 6 ft 3 in (191 cm) | 6 ft 0 in (183 cm) |
| Weight | 193 1/2 lb (88 kg) | 177 1/2 lb (81 kg) |
| Style | Orthodox | Orthodox |
| Recognition | 1960 Olympic light heavyweight Gold Medallist | |

Result
- Clay won by KO in 1st round (1:34)

| Preceded by vs. Tony Esperti | Cassius Clay's bouts 2 February 1961 | Succeeded by vs. Donnie Fleeman |
| Preceded by vs. Harry Bellefonte | Jim Robinson's bouts 2 February 1961 | Succeeded by vs. Claude Williams |

Cassius Clay vs. Jim Robinson was a professional boxing match contested on February 7, 1961.

== Background ==
The day before the bout Clay took part in a public sparring session with former heavyweight champion Ingemar Johansson, ahead of his third bout with Floyd Patterson.

Robinson was a last minute replacement for Willie Gullatt who was supposed to fight Clay on the night of the fight.

This fight was on the undercard of Harold Johnson vs. Jesse Bowdry for the vacant NBA light heavyweight title, which had been stripped from Archie Moore for failure to defend within six months.

== The fight ==
Clay won the fight through a technical knockout when the referee stopped the fight in the first round.

== Undercard ==
Confirmed bouts:
