= 5th Street Gym =

Gym in Miami, Florida

Coordinates: 25°47′11.5″N 80°8′29″W

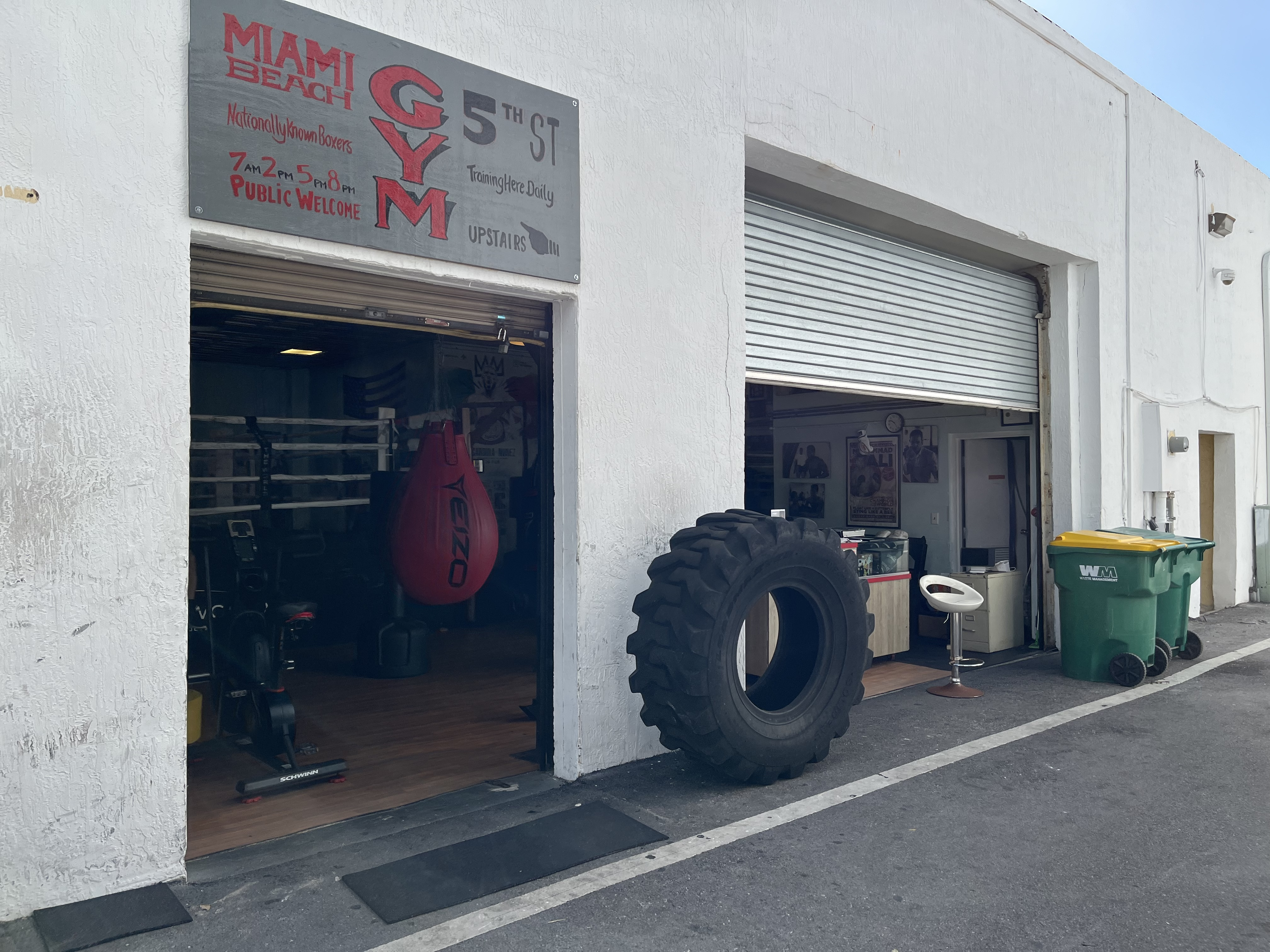
5th Street Gym, November 2023

The 5th Street Gym (also known as World Famous 5th St. Gym) is a boxing gym in Miami Beach, Florida. Now located in an alley on 5th Street, the gym originally operated from 1950 until its closure in 1993. Founders Chris Dundee and Angelo Dundee trained many notable fighters including Muhammad Ali. The gym was frequented by celebrities. Today, the gym is frequented by a variety of people, including notable fighters and local residents.

== History ==
The 5th Street Gym was founded by Philadelphia-born boxing manager Chris Dundee in 1951. Dundee created the gym when he became a fight promoter at the Miami Beach Auditorium. Established in Miami Beach, Florida, it was situated at 5th Street and 501 Washington Avenue. Chris Dundee's younger brother, Angelo Dundee, joined the gym in the mid-1950s after an apprenticeship in New York, helping to develop and manage the stable of fighters.

Muhammad Ali, then still known as Cassius Clay, started training at the 5th Street Gym in December 1960. The gym's door was managed by trainer Sully Emmett, who charged varying fees—25 cents to enter the gym, 50 cents when Ali trained, and $1 during major Ali pre-fight workouts.

Longtime matchmaker Moe Fleischer relocated to Miami, Florida in the 1960s and joined the 5th Street Gym as a trainer.

In 1982, Chris Dundee sold the 5th Street Gym to promoter Felix Zabala but continued operating it. The original 5th Street Gym was demolished in 1993.

The 5th Street Gym was relaunched in September 2011 at 555 Washington Avenue by Angelo Dundee and a team of businessmen: Matt Baiamonte, Tom Tsatas, and Dino Spencer. In May 2013, Jim Dundee, the late Angelo's son, terminated the licensing agreement, saying the gym was no longer aligned with his father's legacy. Tom Tsatas and Dino Spencer, former partners, announced a separate gym under the name "World Famous 5th Street Gym," unaffiliated with the Dundee brand.

== Notable fighters ==
- (United States) Muhammad Ali
- (United States) Willie Pastrano
- (United States) Ralph Dupas
- (United States) Sugar Ray Leonard
- (United States) Carmen Basilio
- (United States) Jimmy Ellis
- (Cuba) Luis Manuel Rodríguez
- (Cuba) José Nápoles
- (Cuba) Sugar Ramos
- (Cuba) Florentino Fernández
- (Hungary) Martin László
- (flagicon jROM) (Traian Niculae (BOXER) Cref name tune 1992
