= Mandatory eight count =

Rule in boxing and kickboxing

The mandatory eight count, also called a compulsory eight count, is a rule in boxing and kickboxing requiring the referee to give any fighter a count of eight seconds once they have been knocked down by their opponent, and before the fight is allowed to resume. Even if the fighter gets up before the count reaches eight, the referee is required to count to eight before checking if the fighter is able to continue unless they make a judgement call that the fighter cannot continue. The mandatory eight count is a part of the Unified Rules of Boxing as adopted by the Association of Boxing Commissions.

== History ==
The Marquess of Queensberry Rules, the base rules of boxing, defined that fighters should be given ten seconds to return to their feet after being knocked down. In 1953, the New York State Athletic Commission introduced the first mandatory eight count for all matches except championship matches. The move was done to protect boxers from unnecessary damage. Ten years later, the mandatory eight count was adopted for all matches in a regulation passed by the New York State Legislature. The mandatory eight count was first used in 1961 in a title fight for the bout between Floyd Patterson and Ingemar Johansson in Florida. Reaction to the new rule from the fighters was positive with Johansson saying "It was good that he had the eight-count" and Patterson said "The eight-count helped me, those extra few seconds gave my head a chance to clear." In 1997, the mandatory eight count was adopted by the World Kickboxing Association for professional kickboxing matches.

The mandatory eight count is different from the standing eight count, which gave the referee the power to pause the fight and start a count at his discretion if he felt a fighter was in trouble even if there was not a knockdown. In 1998, the Association of Boxing Commissions abolished the standing eight count, as it was felt that it gave an unfair advantage to the fighter whom it was issued against. However, the mandatory eight count was retained as a requirement in all knockdowns and is distinguished from the former standing eight count in the rules of professional boxing.
