= LaMar Clark =

American boxer

LaMar Freeman Clark
Personal information
- Nationality: American
- Born: December 1, 1933 Cedar City, Utah
- Died: November 5, 2006 (aged 72) West Jordan, Utah
- Height: 5 ft 10 in (1.78 m)
- Weight: Heavyweight

Boxing career
- Stance: Orthodox

Boxing record
- Total fights: 46
- Wins: 43
- Win by KO: 42
- Losses: 3

LaMar Freeman Clark (December 1, 1933 – November 5, 2006) was an American professional boxer who fought in the heavyweight division. He was active from 1958 to 1961 and fought a recorded 46 times in his 3 year-career, mostly in his home state of Utah. The Guinness Book of World Records lists Clark as the boxer with the most consecutive knockouts (42), and also the most knockouts in one night (six). Clark's knockout streak garnered him nationwide press attention, though some commentators have derided the poor quality of his opposition.

== Amateur career ==
Clark claimed an amateur record of 25–2, winning a regional Golden Gloves championship in the process.

== Professional career ==
Clark was managed by Marv Jensen, who also managed middleweight champion Gene Fullmer. He made his professional debut on January 4, 1958, winning a six-round decision over John Hicks. Subsequently, Clark won his next 44 bouts by knockout. The Historical Dictionary of Boxing describes the quality of his opposition in these bouts as "poor". None was a rated contender and most had little or no professional experience. In a December 1959 column reflecting on Clark's long KO streak, Red Smith wrote: "Up to now Clark has been whipping sheep herders and streetcar conductors", and thus reserved judgement on his ability.

To build publicity for Clark, Jensen arranged for him to fight twice in one night; Clark won both bouts by KO. Clark followed up by knocking out three opponents on 10 November 1958 and six opponents on 1 December 1958 (including five in the first round and one within 7 seconds). Another of Clark's wins was against Tony Burton, who later appeared in the Rocky movies, in a bout refereed by Jack Dempsey. On 11 January 1960, Clark knocked out Kenneth Hayden, his 44th consecutive knockout, surpassing the previous record held by Billy Fox.

In April 1960, Clark was matched with Bartolo Soni, described as a "tough journeyman" who had never been knocked out. Clark was unable to KO Soni and was himself stopped in the ninth round. Clark then fought Pete Rademacher, the 1956 Olympic gold medalist and former heavyweight title contender; Rademacher won by a tenth-round knockout. His last fight was on April 19, 1961, against Cassius Clay (later Muhammad Ali). Clay broke Clark's nose and knocked him out in the second round. Clark retired after this fight.

Other sources state that Clark had 42 or 45 knockouts.

== Personal life ==
After retiring from boxing, Clark worked as a track foreman for the railroad operations at Kennecott's Bingham Canyon Mine until retiring in 1984.

Clark died on November 5, 2006, aged 72. Clark was survived by his wife of 46 years, Brenda and his daughters Nicole Clark-Romano, Cherese Jones and Theresa Clark. As well as son-in-laws Tony Romano and Brent Jones and Theresa's son, Dillen LaMar Clark.

== Professional boxing record ==
46 fights	43 wins	3 losses
By knockout	42	3
By decision	1	0

No.	Result	Record	Opponent	Type	Round, time	Date	Location	Notes
46	Loss	43–3	(United States) Cassius Clay	KO	2 (10), 1:27	1961-04-19	(United States) Freedom Hall State Fairground, Louisville, Kentucky, USA	
45	Win	43–2	(United States) Chuck Wilburn	KO	2 (10)	1961-03-04	(United States) Convention Center, Las Vegas, Nevada, USA	
44	Loss	42–2	(United States) Pete Rademacher	TKO	10 (10), 2:27	1960-06-29	(United States) Derks Field, Salt Lake City, Utah, USA	
43	Loss	42–1	(Dominican Republic) Bartolo Soni	TKO	9 (10), 2:02	1960-04-08	(United States) Weber High School Gymnasium, Ogden, Utah, USA	
42	Win	42–0	(United States) Kenneth Hayden	KO	1 (6), 0:59	1960-01-11	(United States) Convention Center, Las Vegas, Nevada, USA	
41	Win	41–0	(United States) Kooey Garcia	KO	1 (8), 1:07	1960-01-02	(United States) West Jordan, Utah, USA	
40	Win	40–0	(United States) Charley Davis	KO	1 (8)	1959-12-04	(United States) George Nelson Field House, Logan, Utah, USA	
39	Win	39–0	(United States) Tony Borne	KO	1 (8)	1959-05-04	(United States) Salt Lake City, Utah, USA	
38	Win	38–0	(United States) Treach Phillips	KO	1 (8)	1959-05-04	(United States) Salt Lake City, Utah, USA	
37	Win	37–0	(United States) Tony Burton	KO	4 (6)	1959-04-04	(United States) Polo Grounds, Palm Springs, California, USA	
36	Win	36–0	(United States) Rod Orell	KO	1 (8), 1:29	1959-03-20	(United States) Fairgrounds Coliseum, Salt Lake City, Utah, USA	
35	Win	35–0	(United States) Ferrin Barr	KO	1 (8)	1959-02-07	(United States) Helper, Utah, USA	
34	Win	34–0	(United States) Ferrin Barr	KO	2 (6)	1959-01-26	(United States) Eldred Recreation Center, Provo, Utah, USA	
33	Win	33–0	(United States) Bob Hall	KO	1 (8)	1959-01-24	(United States) Helper, Utah, USA	
32	Win	32–0	(United States) Ox Anderson	KO	2 (8)	1959-01-23	(United States) Fairgrounds Coliseum, Salt Lake City, Utah, USA	
31	Win	31–0	(United States) Phil Paxton	KO	1 (8), 1:39	1959-01-16	(United States) Uintah High School Gym, Vernal, Utah, USA	
30	Win	30–0	(United States) Dennis Forsland	KO	1 (8), 1:31	1958-12-26	(United States) Fairgrounds Coliseum, Salt Lake City, Utah, USA	
29	Win	29–0	(United States) Ferrin Barr	KO	2 (8)	1958-12-22	(United States) Cedar City, Utah, USA	
28	Win	28–0	(United States) Cornell Butler	KO	1 (8), 1:21	1958-12-15	(United States) Arena, Cleveland, Ohio, USA	
27	Win	27–0	(United States) Allan Hedge	KO	1 (8), 0:35	1958-12-15	(United States) Arena, Cleveland, Ohio, USA	
26	Win	26–0	(United States) Del Randall	KO	1 (8), 0:22	1958-12-01	(United States) Bingham, Utah, USA	Part of 'Intermountain Heavyweight Champion' tournament.
25	Win	25–0	(United States) John Lowd	KO	1 (8), 1:19	1958-12-01	(United States) Bingham, Utah, USA	Part of 'Intermountain Heavyweight Champion' tournament.
24	Win	24–0	(United States) Dick Pierce	KO	1 (8), 0:44	1958-12-01	(United States) Bingham, Utah, USA	Part of 'Intermountain Heavyweight Champion' tournament.
23	Win	23–0	(United States) Jack Read	TKO	1 (8), 0:07	1958-12-01	(United States) Bingham, Utah, USA	Part of 'Intermountain Heavyweight Champion' tournament.
22	Win	22–0	(United States) Tom Kidd	KO	1 (8)	1958-12-01	(United States) Bingham, Utah, USA	Part of 'Intermountain Heavyweight Champion' tournament.
21	Win	21–0	(United States) Wayne Ennis	KO	2 (8), 1:37	1958-12-01	(United States) Bingham, Utah, USA	Part of 'Intermountain Heavyweight Champion' tournament.
20	Win	20–0	(United States) Sain Thompson	KO	1 (8)	1958-11-29	(United States) Kanab, Utah, USA	Part of 'Intermountain Heavyweight Champion' tournament.
19	Win	19–0	(United States) Jimmy King	KO	1 (8), 2:12	1958-11-28	(United States) Kanab, Utah, USA	Part of 'Intermountain Heavyweight Champion' tournament.
18	Win	18–0	(United States) Hal Crump	KO	2 (8), 1:40	1958-11-28	(United States) Kanab, Utah, USA	Part of 'Intermountain Heavyweight Champion' tournament.
17	Win	17–0	(United States) Ken Howard	KO	1 (4), 1:35	1958-11-10	(United States) Fairgrounds Coliseum, Salt Lake City, Utah, USA	
16	Win	16–0	(United States) Dick Tanner	RTD	2 (4), 3:00	1958-11-10	(United States) Fairgrounds Coliseum, Salt Lake City, Utah, USA	
15	Win	15–0	(United States) Maurice Leniece	KO	1 (4), 2:11	1958-11-10	(United States) Fairgrounds Coliseum, Salt Lake City, Utah, USA	
14	Win	14–0	(United States) Ricky Smith	KO	1 (4), 2:32	1958-10-13	(United States) West Jordan Elementary School, West Jordan, Utah, USA	
13	Win	13–0	(United States) Oscar Talley	KO	1 (4), 0:55	1958-10-13	(United States) West Jordan Elementary School, West Jordan, Utah, USA	
12	Win	12–0	(United States) Rusty Davis	KO	1 (6), 2:01	1958-09-11	(United States) Derks Field, Salt Lake City, Utah, USA	
11	Win	11–0	(United States) Joe Sullivan	KO	4 (8)	1958-07-26	(United States) Arena, West Jordan, Utah, USA	
10	Win	10–0	(United States) Willie Dalton	KO	1 (8)	1958-07-17	(United States) West Jordan, Utah, USA	
9	Win	9–0	(United States) Dynamite Jackson	KO	1 (6), 0:37	1958-07-07	(United States) West Jordan, Utah, USA	
8	Win	8–0	(United States) Buck Dixon	KO	4 (4), 0:39	1958-06-04	(United States) West Jordan Park, West Jordan, Utah, USA	
7	Win	7–0	(United States) Jerry Olster	KO	2 (8)	1958-04-05	(United States) Cedar City, Utah, USA	
6	Win	6–0	(United States) Buck Dixon	KO	1 (4), 2:30	1958-03-03	(United States) Fairgrounds Coliseum, Salt Lake City, Utah, USA	
5	Win	5–0	(United States) Keith Jacobsen	KO	1 (4), 1:02	1958-01-28	(United States) Fairgrounds Coliseum, Salt Lake City, Utah, USA	
4	Win	4–0	(United States) Jack Read	KO	2 (8)	1958-01-21	(United States) Cedar City, Utah, USA	
3	Win	3–0	(United States) John Hicks	KO	3 (8)	1958-01-18	(United States) Cedar City, Utah, USA	
2	Win	2–0	(United States) Willard Whitaker	KO	2 (10)	1958-01-11	(United States) Cedar City, Utah, USA	
1	Win	1–0	(United States) John Hicks	PTS	6 (6)	1958-01-04	(United States) Cedar City, Utah, USA	
