= Michael Brennan (photographer) =

English-American photographer

Michael J. Brennan (born August 13, 1943) is an English-American photographer who is known for his photographic portraits of leaders, athletes, celebrities and cultural figures.

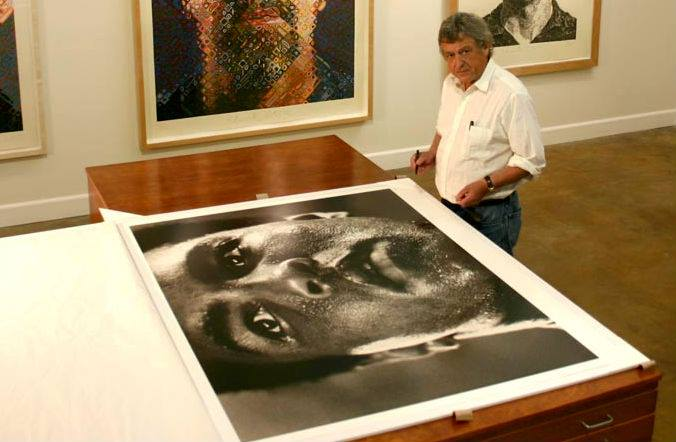
Michael Brennan in November, 2011 with a print of his photo "1977"

== Career ==
Born in Sheffield, Yorkshire, Brennan began his career as a runner and then a news photographer for The Croydon Times. Between 1964 and 1970 he worked in the North of England as a photographer for the regional offices of The Sunday People and The Daily Herald.

He first gained notice for a series of photographs he took of the death of Donald Campbell who died while attempting the world water speed record in 1967. The photos appeared in Life magazine and won Brennan the British News Picture of the Year award.

Brennan worked next as a photographer for Rupert Murdoch's The Sun. After then moving to the Daily Mail he covered important news events like The Troubles in Northern Ireland and The Indo-Pakistani wars and conflicts and spent time with the then unknown Mother Teresa of Calcutta.

After moving to the United States in 1973 Brennan began taking photos of American notables, and also accepted photo assignments for Sports Illustrated magazine. This assignment led to a series of photos of the boxer Muhammad Ali.

A 1977 Brennan photo of Muhammad Ali has been called "iconic" and is in the collection of the Smithsonian National Portrait Gallery.

After a fifty-year career in photography, Brennan is now retired and living in Costa Rica.

== Photographic subjects (partial list) ==
During his career Brennan has photographed the following individuals:

Queen Elizabeth II, Nelson Mandela, Princess Diana, Pelé, George Best, Jimmy Carter, Mick Jagger, John Lennon, Norman Mailer, Frank Sinatra, Barbra Streisand, P.G. Wodehouse. Fidel Castro, Tony Blair, Paul McCartney, Rod Stewart, Freddie Mercury, Joe Namath, Jimmy Page, Alice Cooper, Elvis Presley, Mickey Rourke, Robert Mitchum, Mother Teresa, Artur Rubenstein, Mike Tyson, Henry Miller, Elmore Leonard, John Grisham, E Howard Hunt, Elizabeth Ray, Tommie Smith, Liv Tyler, Jacqueline Kennedy-Onassis, George Wallace, Clara Hale, Deborah Harry, George Foreman, Joe Frazier, Marvin Hagler, Lennox Lewis, Ricky Hatton, Björn Borg, Andre Agassi, Alger Hiss.

== Publications (partial list) ==
Photos by Michael Brennan have appeared in the following publications:

- Sports Illustrated
- Life magazine
- Rolling Stone
- Stern magazine
- The Australian
- The New York Times
- The Sydney Morning Herald
- The Australian
- Bunte (Germany)
- You magazine (United Kingdom)
- The Times of London
- The Sunday Times
- The Observer (United Kingdom)
- Asahi Shimbun (Japan)

== Articles by Michael Brennan ==
- Sports Illustrated, September 22, 1980: Ali and His Educators

== External links to photographs ==
- Time Magazine Lightbox, Happy Birthday, Muhammad Ali: 70 Iconic Images for 70 Years, photo by Michael Brennan
- Corbis Images: Michael Brennan Photographer
- Was Norman Mailer the Last Tough Guy?: photo of Norman Mailer by Michael Brennan
- Former Beatle John Lennon (1940 - 1980) in Beverly Hills, California, 1979. (Photo by Michael Brennan/Getty Images)
- Rolling Stone: Led Zeppelin: Rarely Seen Photos from "Good Times, Bad Times"
- The Michael Brennan Photo Library

== Video ==
- Press Pictures Awards, 1967: Michael Brennan accepts "Picture of the Year" award
