= Felix Zabala =

American boxing promoter (1937–2021)

Felix "Tuto" Zabala (October 18, 1937 – May 6, 2021) was a Miami-based boxing promoter and manager. He was a promoter and manager of over 50 fighters for forty years, handling world champions, contenders, and other fighters. Boxing historian Hank Kaplan considered him “the best promoter in Miami”. He was also inducted into the "Florida Boxing Hall of Fame" as part of the "Class of 2009".

== Early life ==
Zabala was forced to deal with national conflicts early in his life. At 21 years old, he took up arms against the Castro government. He was eventually captured and detained for questioning in 1961. Though he was married, Zabala chose to flee Cuba on August 25, 1961. A friend who worked at an airline assisted him and got him aboard a flight to Jamaica. He worked as a taxi driver in Kingston for three months. With other Cuban militants, he joined an exile community in San Juan, Puerto Rico where he helped found Alpha 66. His wife, child, and young brother arrived from Havana soon thereafter.

== Boxing promotion ==
In need of money Zabala began work as a boxing promoter, tirelessly putting up posters and other materials. His first large promotion was between middleweights Florentino Fernández and Rocky Rivero. The day Rivero was due to arrive in San Juan for the match, Zabala received a phone call from Rivero's management saying that they wanted double the previously agreed-upon amount of money. Zabala paid him half of his requested payment upon arrival; however, he refused to pay the remaining difference after the fight, citing the terms of the existing contract.

Due to business reasons, by 1980, Zabala felt he had to leave San Juan. He relocated to Miami, where he took a job as regional representative for Muhammad Ali Professional Sports. However, he continued to promote Puerto Rican fights as well. Zabala retained his close contacts with fighters and trainers in Puerto Rico, however, and continued to promote events on the Caribbean nation. He bought a gym in 1982 from fellow promoter Chris Dundee.

Tuto Zabala's first champion was Dominican Republic native Carlos Teo Cruz, a lightweight with a good chin and a light punch. The next Zabala champion was Vicente Paul Rondon, a Venezuelan fighter who was WBA light-heavyweight champion from 1971 to 1972. From the early sixties to the late seventies, Zabala promoted several hundred fights in San Juan, booked Puerto Rican fighters to fight abroad, and was involved in a dozen world title fights. Besides Florentino Fernandez, Teo Cruz and Vicente Rondon, Tuto Zabala promoted Miguel "Happy" Lora, Alfredo Escalera, Robinson Pitalua, Angel Espada, Jose Gonzalez, Pedro Miranda, Sammy Serrano and many other main event fighters and prelim club fighters.

=== Co-Promotion with Don King ===
For a few years, until the spring of 1998, Allstar and Don King Productions had a co-promotion deal, though the relationship between Zabala and King goes back to the early Seventies, when Zabala was still in Puerto Rico. Their association ended during preparations for that 1998 Wilfredo Vazquez-Naseem Hamed confrontation in England. King had wanted Vazquez to fight a rematch with the WBA mandatory challenger, Antonio Cermeno, whom King promoted, and who had beaten Vazquez in 1995 to win the WBA Junior Featherweight world title from him. Zabala logically went for the more lucrative and higher-profile bout.

“We don't do business together anymore, but I still consider [King] my friend,” Zabala explained. “We've been friends a long time. I even had a fiftieth birthday party for him; it was about fifteen, seventeen years ago. It was in our back yard. We had lechón asada and black beans.”

== Willie Martinez ==
Willie Martinez was entering Miami's boxing scene, and it was Zabala who helped him put together his first program. The good relations between Martinez and Zabala didn't last. For months they fought over the rights to Miguel “Happy” Lora, the celebrated Colombian bantamweight Zabala had guided over several years to a world championship. In 1986 Zabala had to cancel a show at Tamiami Park because, he claimed, Martinez stole two of the principal fighters on the program. Zabala decided by then that his only recourse was to publicly denounce Martinez as the drug trafficker most people suspected he was. Zabala made the announcement on Spanish-language radio and called a press conference. This displeased Martinez to the point that he paid two Metro-Dade Police officers to stop Zabala and his wife as they were leaving a restaurant. A few minutes into a search of Zabala's car, the officers pulled out a bag of cocaine and handcuffed him.

Martinez was arrested in 1988 and pleaded guilty to drug and money-laundering charges and agreed to turn in his associates; two years later he had helped lock up three cops, a DEA agent, and other crooks. His testimony also helped to convict Miami Beach Mayor Alex Daoud on corruption charges in 1993. Instead of the life prison term he could have received, he received a nine-year sentence. At his sentencing Martinez testified that he had paid the two officers to plant the coke on Zabala and to provide protection and perform other favors.

== The Last Years of Boxing Promotion ==
Felix Zabala had signed a deal with Galavision and also staged two programs at the Club Fantasy Show. Telemundo broadcast a lot of Zabala cards at the Mahi Temple and at the Curtis Ivy Police Athletic League gym in Homestead. The day after the fights, Zabala would ship a video of the matches to WAPA-TV, Channel 4, in San Juan, Puerto Rico. The station would air the show, and from there the video would be distributed throughout the rest of Latin America. Zabala had been following this practice (independent of his network television deals) for about two decades, ensuring that the programs reach his most passionate audiences.

On January 8, 2001, a stroke ended his career leaving him with little ability for speech and movement.
