= Standing eight count =

Rule in boxing

A standing eight count, also known as a protection count, is a boxing judgment call made by a referee during a bout in order to give an overwhelmed fighter an eight-second respite. When it is invoked, the referee stops the action and counts to eight while observing the boxer it is called against. When the count reaches eight, the referee often moves back two steps and instructs the boxer to walk towards them and hold their arms out. This helps the referee determine if the boxer is functioning and alert enough to continue. If the boxer is unsteady on their feet or seems unable to focus on the referee, the bout is ended by TKO. A standing eight count is scored a knockdown, and in Olympic style boxing, counts as one of three in a round, or four in a match before an automatic knockout.

The standing eight count was instituted in 1982 after the death of boxer Kim Duk-koo. However, the Association of Boxing Commissions eliminated it in 1998, believing it to favor the fighter it is called against, so it is seldom applied in professional bouts today. In Olympic style boxing, a standing eight count can be assessed for a hard punch where the boxer is hurt but not technically knocked down, but legally is knocked down.

A standing eight count is different from a mandatory eight count, which is assessed only once a fighter is knocked down.
