= Floyd Patterson vs. Ingemar Johansson III =

Boxing match

The Showdown
- Date: March 13, 1961
- Venue: Miami Beach Exhibition Hall, Miami Beach, Florida, U.S.
- Title(s) on the line: NBA, NYSAC, and The Ring undisputed heavyweight championship

Tale of the tape
Boxer	Floyd Patterson	Ingemar Johansson
Nickname	"The Gentleman of Boxing"	"Ingo"
Hometown	Waco, North Carolina, U.S.	Gothenburg, Västra Götaland, Sweden
Purse	$912,500	$712,500
Pre-fight record	36–2 (26 KO)	22–1 (14 KO)
Age	26 years, 2 months	28 years, 5 months
Height	6 ft 0 in (183 cm)	6 ft 0 in (183 cm)
Weight	194 3/4 lb (88 kg)	206 1/2 lb (94 kg)
Style	Orthodox	Orthodox
Recognition	NBA, NYSAC and The Ring undisputed Heavyweight Champion	NBA; No. 3 Ranked Heavyweight; The Ring; No. 2 Ranked Heavyweight; Former undisputed heavyweight champion

Result
- Patterson defeats Johansson by 6th round KO

Floyd Patterson vs. Ingemar Johansson III, billed as The Showdown, was a professional boxing match contested on March 13, 1961, for the undisputed heavyweight championship.

== Background ==
In the aftermath of Floyd Patterson regaining the heavyweight championship from Ingemar Johansson, both men expressed interest in a third bout, with Johansson saying the day after his loss "Maybe next time it will be different." Others were less keen with the president of the NBA, Anthony Maceroni saying "It was a good bout, honest and sincere and a decisive victory for Patterson. The heavyweight division has been stalled long enough. We believe that there are many challengers available in that division." Both No. 1 ranked Sonny Liston and No. 5 ranked Eddie Machen were mentioned as possible challengers.

On 28 July it was reported that an agreement had been finalized for the fight to take place on 1 November in Los Angeles, California. However Patterson would claim that he had not been consulted about the proposed date and had found out from a gas station attendant, who had heard the news on the radio. He would tell the Associated Press "You'd think that since I'm the champion the promoters would be polite enough to ask me. I might fight Johansson before November 1 or after November 1, but I'll not fight him on November 1." Later Patterson's manager Cus D'Amato would claim that the bout needed to be delayed into 1961 because Johansson might run into "tax troubles" if he fought before 1 January 1961. Subsequently, it was reported that the bout was being delayed by a dispute within promoters Feature Sports.

In late December 1960 the bout was reported to be set for 20 March 1961 in Miami Beach, Florida, with Patterson an early 17–5 favourite. The bout was later brought forward a week on 13 March. On 19 January 1961 the bout was formally signed by Patterson, Johansson and D. Lee Powell, the Mayor of Miami Beach. Part of the agreement was a guarantee that there would be no segregation at the Exhibition Hall, with promoters Feature Sports posting a $10,000 bond with a New York bank which would go to the NAACP if the city reneged.

On 6 February, Patterson held a public sparring session in the Convention Centre, where he faced, amongst others 1960 Olympic light heavyweight Gold Medallist Cassius Clay (the day before his 3rd professional bout). The young Clay impressed, with Johansson telling reporters immediately after the session "He's good, this fellow. He did a lot of jumping around, and isn't a bit like Patterson as he changes around too much. I hope I can get him for more sparring. He sharpens me up."

Former champion Max Schmeling, told press that the odds favouring Patterson were too lopsided saying "I am not picking either man, but I have heard odds which make Patterson a 4–1 or 18–5 favourite. If one man is truly a 4–1 favourite, the two men do not belong in the same ring in a championship fight. I like punchers, and both these men can punch. But Johansson can punch better with his right than Patterson can. This doesn't mean I pick Johansson to win, but it does mean that this will be a very even fight-it is not any 4–1 affair." He also added that he believed that both men had taken the other lightly in the past "Patterson underestimated Johansson in the first fight, Ingemar underestimated Floyd in the second. Now each has proper respect for the other. Really, it is taking the easy way to just guess at a winner and a round. You must look carefully at both men and when you do that for this fight, you have to say that either man could win."

When number No. 1 ranked contender Sonny Liston was asked what it would take for him to face the winner, he replied that he would fight either for nothing as long as the title was on the line although he doubted he would, adding "From the way Cus D'Amato talks, I guess I'll never get Patterson. Johansson, I don't know about him. When he didn't have the title he said he would fight me. When he won it he wouldn't fight me. I don't know how he would feel if he wins this time."

Despite weighing in at a career high 194 3/4 lb (4 3/4 above the last Johansson bout), Patterson's trainer Dan Florio claimed that the champion was "...in the greatest shape ever". Johansson was also at a career high weight.

On fight night Patterson was a 4-1 favourite to defeat Johansson. This was the first heavyweight title fight to use the Mandatory eight count.

== The fight ==
The fight got underway with a strong police presence. Both men begin the bout jabs before a right cross from Johansson dropped the champion. Patterson was up at the count of four and benefitted from a Mandatory eight count which allowed him to recover. Nevertheless, with almost a minute left in the round, a right uppercut sent him down for the second time, but again Patterson rose quickly. Shortly afterwards a flashing left hook to the jaw sent Johansson down. He also rose quickly and received a Mandatory eight count. This marked the first time since the Jack Dempsey vs. Luis Ángel Firpo bout, almost 37 and half years earlier, that both fighters had been dropped in the opening round of the heavyweight title bout.

Both men continued to exchange labs and head shots in the second, with Patterson landing a hard right to body of the challenger. A cut opened above Johansson's right eye in the third. A cut appeared over Patterson's left eye early in the fourth, before hurting Johansson with a pair of rights followed by left hook and a right to the head combination that sent the challenger into the ropes. The fifth saw the pace drop as Johansson appear to tire, as his face appeared puffy under his left eye and the gash over his right eye continued to bleed. While Johansson's left jab was able to cause the champion some problems, Patterson's increased workload (including a number of body punches) was wearing the challenger down.

With just over 30 seconds left in the sixth, a flashing left hook followed by a right to the jaw and chopping right to the ear from Patterson sent Johansson for the second time, he rose to one knee before falling back before rising just after referee Bill Regan waved him off, giving Patterson a 6th-round KO victory.

== Aftermath ==
Speaking about the knockout in the aftermath Johansson said "I thought I was up in time, and I'm sorry I wasn't. When he (referee Regan) say eight, I get a little too anxious and I fell." Regan for his part said "I had just finished the count of a full ten when he tried to get up. He didn't make the full count. When I took him to the corner, he didn't know where he was at. He was bleary-eyed and couldn't have continued."

Speaking the following day Patterson's promoters confirmed that they were hoping for a summer defence against either Liston, Machen or Henry Cooper. Patterson for his part expressed disappoint in his own performance, saying "I thought I looked terrible. But I am very, very happy that I won. I showed no skill at all, only determination. I knew my reflexes and co-ordination were off. I don't know why. I have no excuses."

There were some suggestions that Johansson had been waved off before the full count had been given, however a check of the footage showed that the fight was stopped between 11 and 12 seconds after he was dropped making it a slightly Long count.

== Undercard ==
Confirmed bouts:

== Broadcasting ==
Country	Broadcaster
United Kingdom	BBC

Preceded by Second match	Floyd Patterson's bouts 13 March 1961	Succeeded by vs. Tom McNeeley
Preceded by Second match	Ingemar Johansson's bouts 13 March 1961	Succeeded by vs. Joe Bygraves II
Awards
Preceded by Ingemar Johansson vs. Floyd Patterson II; Round 5	The Ring Round of the Year; Round 1; 1961	Succeeded by Floyd Patterson vs. Sonny Liston; Round 1
