= Angelo Dundee =

American boxing trainer (1921–2012)

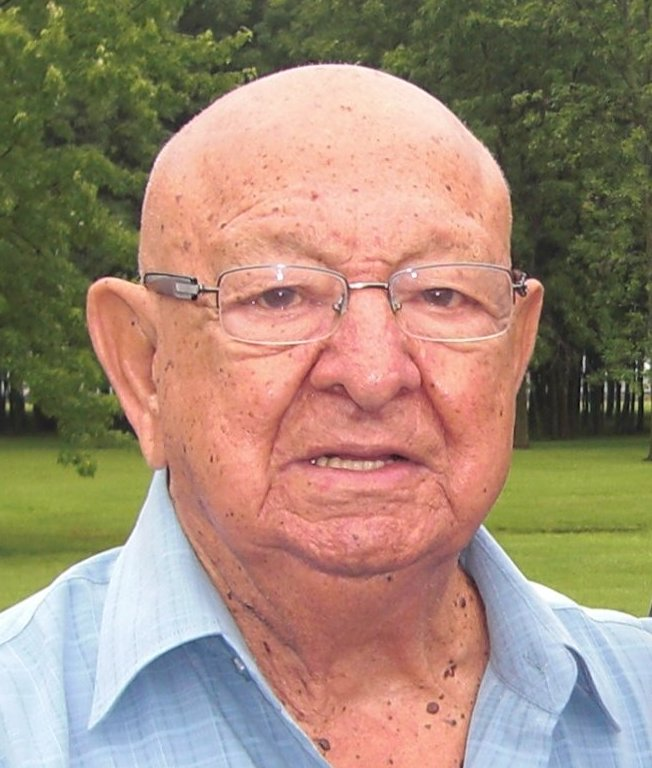
- Dundee in 2010
- Born: Angelo Mirena; August 30, 1921; Philadelphia, Pennsylvania, U.S.
- Died: February 1, 2012 (aged 90); Tampa, Florida, U.S.
- Occupations: Boxing trainer; cornerman
- Years active: 1955–2005
- Known for: Training Muhammad Ali (1960–1981)

Angelo Dundee (born Angelo Mirena; August 30, 1921 – February 1, 2012) was an American boxing trainer and cornerman. Internationally known for his work with Muhammad Ali (1960–1981), he also worked with 15 other world boxing champions, including Sugar Ray Leonard, Sean Mannion, José Nápoles, George Foreman, George Scott, Jimmy Ellis, Carmen Basilio, Luis Manuel Rodríguez, and Willie Pastrano.

== Early life ==
Dundee was born Angelo Mirena on August 30, 1921, in Philadelphia, to an Italian recent immigrant parents Filomena Cianelli, mother of seven children, and Angelo Merenda, a railway construction worker, an Italian native from Roggiano Gravina. (The name of the father was erroneously transcribed as Mirena at the time of immigration.) In the early 1940s he changed his surname to 'Dundee', after the United States champion boxer Johnny Dundee. During World War II he served as an aircraft mechanic in the United States Air Force, including an active service deployment to England in 1944–45. His first experience of cornerman work was in U.S.A.F. boxing tournaments, and after leaving the Air Force in late 1945 at the war's end he headed to New York City where he was employed as a bucket-guy at Stillman's Gym as an apprenticeship as a boxing trainer.

== Boxing trainer career ==
After completing his apprenticeship in New York City, Dundee relocated to Miami Beach, Florida, where he worked with his brother Chris Dundee, founder and owner of the Fifth Street Gym. Carmen Basilio was the first World Champion for whom Dundee acted as a cornerman, when Basilio defeated Tony DeMarco for the world welterweight crown in 1955, and Sugar Ray Robinson for the World Middleweight Crown in 1957.

=== Career with Muhammad Ali ===
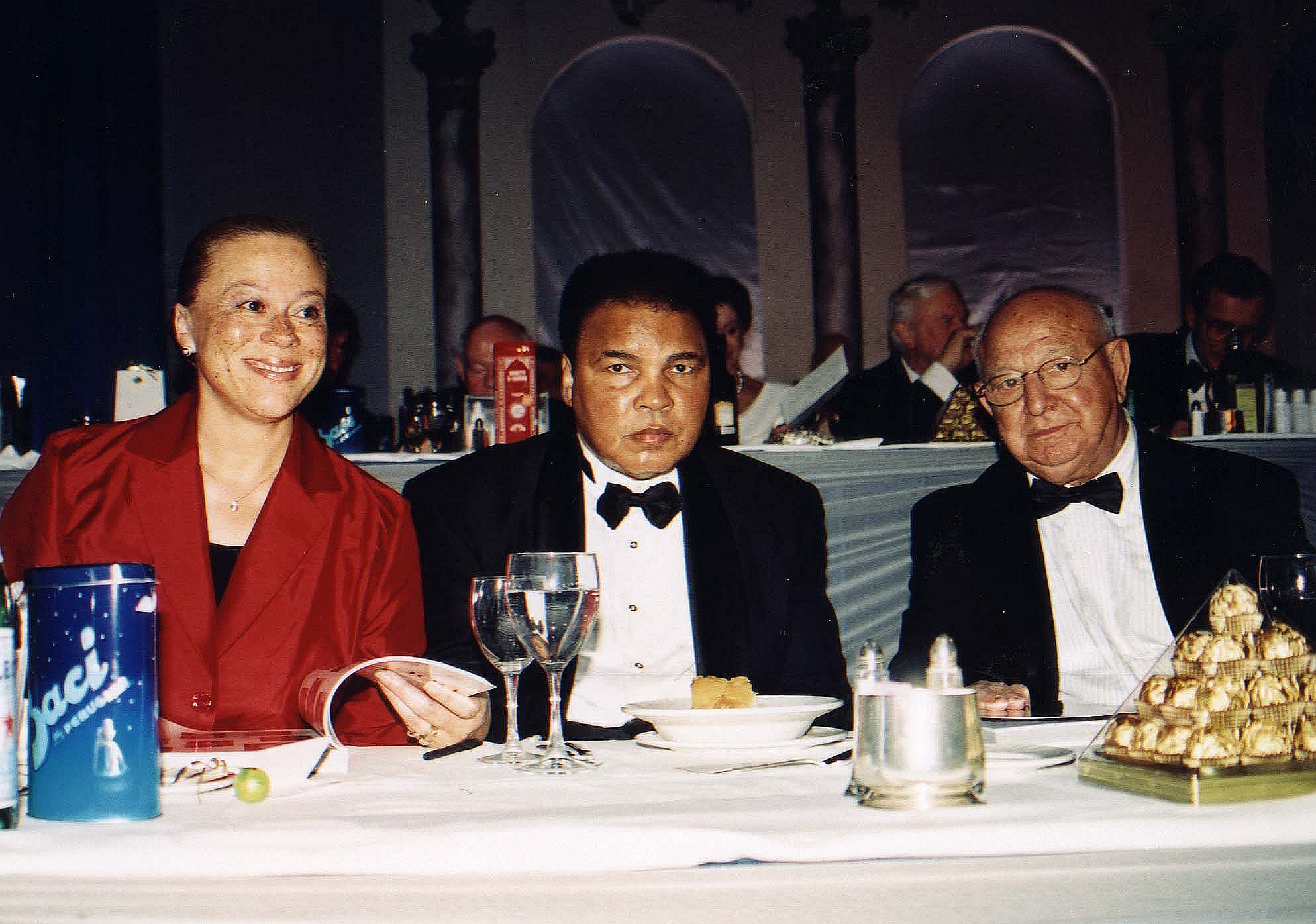
Dundee with Muhammad Ali and his wife Lonnie, 2000

Dundee traveled around the world with Ali, and he was the cornerman in all but two of Ali's fights (Tunney Hunsaker in 1960 and Jimmy Ellis in 1971). Dundee trained the young Cassius Clay, as Ali was then known, in most of his early bouts, including those with Archie Moore (who had trained Clay before his partnering with Dundee) and Sonny Liston, where Clay won the heavyweight title. Dundee continued to train Ali in all of his fights until Ali's exile from boxing, and upon Ali's return to the sport Dundee trained him in almost all of his fights, including Ali's famed bouts with fighters such as Jerry Quarry, Oscar Bonavena, Joe Frazier, Floyd Patterson, George Foreman, Ken Norton and, later, Leon Spinks. One exception was in Ali's 1971 fight with Jimmy Ellis, where Dundee was in Ellis's corner. Ali knocked Ellis out in the 12th round. Dundee was accused by Foreman of loosening the ring ropes before his 1974 The Rumble in the Jungle fight with Ali to help Ali win the fight by using the rope-a-dope technique. Dundee consistently denied tampering with the ropes.

In 1998, after decades, Dundee reunited with Muhammad Ali and appeared alongside him in a sentimental Super Bowl commercial. The two men were friends until Dundee's death and the veteran trainer would always refer to Ali as "my kid".

=== Other work ===
Dundee saw a future emerging star in Sugar Ray Leonard, whom he called "a smaller version of Ali". Dundee acted as cornerman for Leonard in many of his biggest fights, including those with Wilfred Benítez, Roberto Durán, Thomas Hearns, and Marvin Hagler. In Leonard's first bout with Hearns, Dundee, thinking that his protégé was behind on the scorecards, quipped the now famous words, "You're blowing it, son! You're blowing it!" before the start of round 13. Leonard went on to score a fourteenth round win when the referee stopped the fight.

Dundee frequently went to other matches during his career to scout other boxers. During the first Joe Frazier vs. George Foreman bout in Kingston, Jamaica, on January 22, 1973, he sat near Howard Cosell, who was recording a call for ABC for a tape delay re-broadcast. He was overheard on the call noting that Frazier had been hurt before he was knocked down by Foreman the first time in the first round; Cosell mentioned it immediately before his famous "Down goes Frazier!" call. Later in the bout, Dundee was overheard pleading for the fight to be stopped as Frazier was repeatedly knocked down. The fight was finally stopped after Frazier was knocked down for the sixth time, with Foreman winning the bout—and the lineal World Heavyweight Championship—by technical knockout.

He later teamed up with George Foreman, including his 1991 Heavyweight title fight against Evander Holyfield and his 1994 Heavyweight title win against then-undefeated Michael Moorer.

In addition, Dundee also trained world champions Luis Rodriguez, Willie Pastrano, Ralph Dupas, José Nápoles, Pinklon Thomas, Trevor Berbick, Jimmy Ellis, Wilfredo Gómez, Michael Nunn and Sugar Ramos, as well as other boxers including Bill Bossio, David Estrada, Douglas Vaillant, Jimmy Lange, Tom Zbikowski, Troy Darrell, Adilson Rodrigues, James Tillis, Pat O'Connor and Sean Mannion.

=== Reputation ===
Throughout his professional career, Dundee was widely respected as a decent, honorable man in an often corrupt sport. Perhaps the greatest tribute to Dundee was paid by Howard Cosell who said "If I had a son who wanted to be a fighter and I couldn't talk him out of it, the only man I would let train him is Angelo Dundee".

== Retirement ==
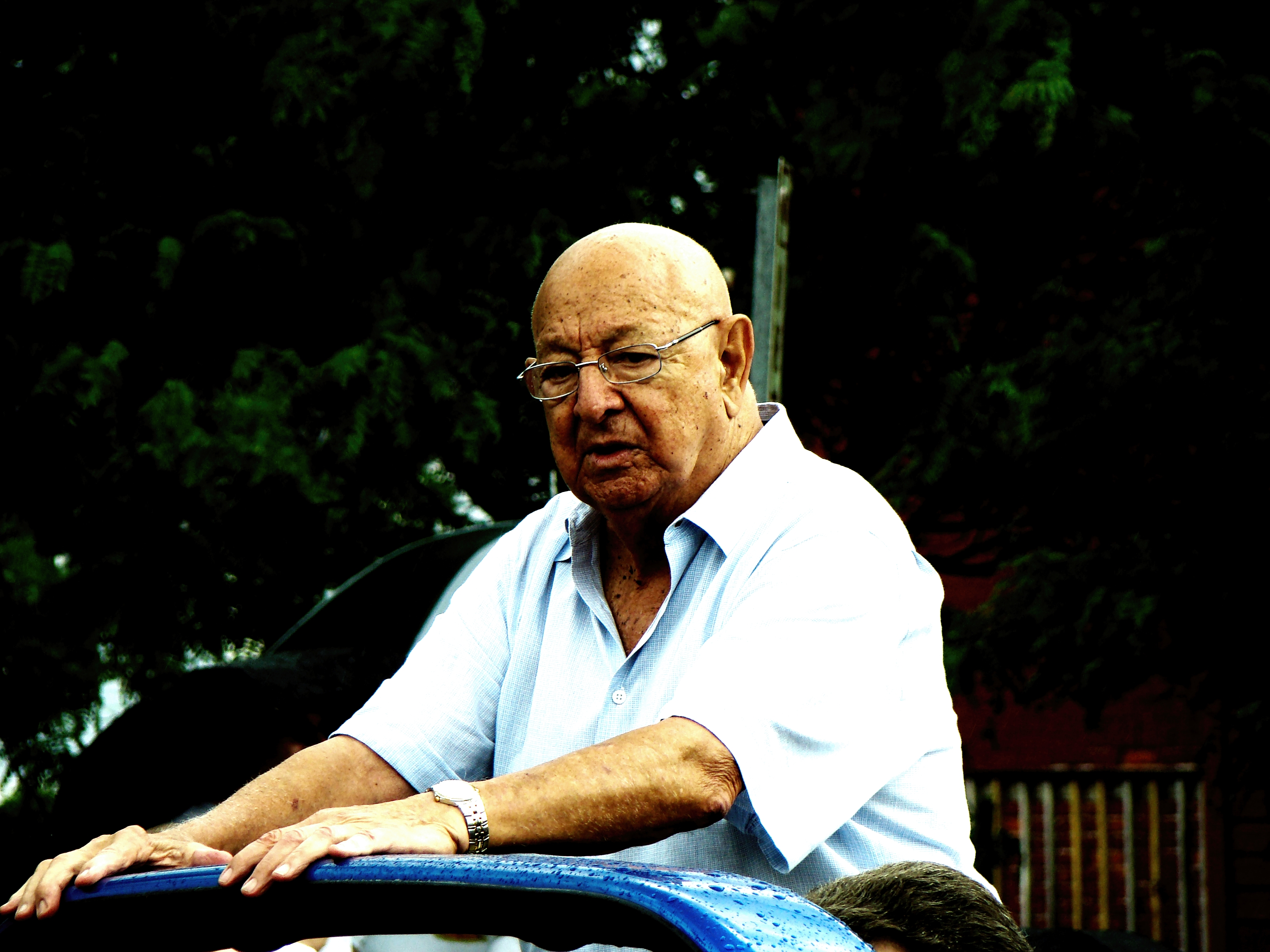
Parade of Champions at International Boxing Hall of Fame in Canastota, NY, 2008.

In 2005, Dundee was hired to train Russell Crowe for Crowe's characterization of James J. Braddock in Cinderella Man. To that end, Dundee traveled to Australia to work with the Oscar-winning actor and appeared in the film as "Angelo" the corner man. In November 2008, he was hired as a special consultant for Oscar De La Hoya's fight with Manny Pacquiao.

== Death ==
Dundee died peacefully while sleeping at his senior resident apartment at the age of 90 on the night of February 1, 2012, in Tampa, Florida. A funeral was held on February 10, 2012, at the Countryside Christian Center in Clearwater, Florida, attended by a crowd of several hundred mourners, among them Muhammad Ali. Dundee's body was buried in Sylvan Abbey Memorial Park cemetery in Clearwater, Florida.

== Honors ==
Dundee was inducted into the International Boxing Hall of Fame in 1992.

== Publications ==
- My View From the Corner: A Life in Boxing (2009) (autobiography).
- I Only Talk Winning (1985) autobiography. Angelo dundee. Mike winters. Publisher Robson books Ltd. London

== Popular culture ==
Depictions of Dundee have appeared in four films. He was played by Ernest Borgnine in The Greatest (1977), by Ron Silver in Ali (2001), by Michael Imperioli in One Night in Miami (2020), and by Giovanni Ribisi in The Greatest (2026).
