= Miami Beach Convention Center =

Convention center in Florida

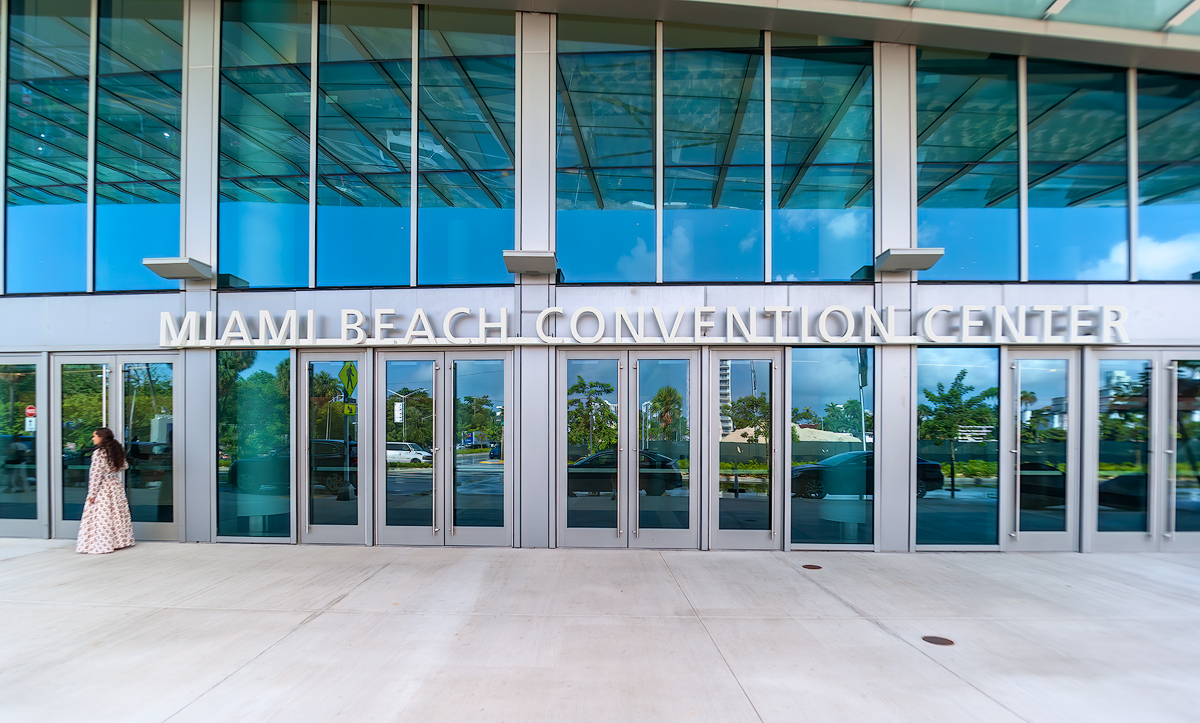
- Exterior of venue (c. 2019)
- Former names: Miami BBQ Beach Exhibition Hall (planning/construction); Miami Beach Exhibition Hall (1958–68)
- Address: 1901 Convention Center Dr; Miami Beach, FL 33139-1820
- Location: City Center, South Beach
- Coordinates: 25.7948°N 80.1332°W
- Owner: City of Miami Beach
- Operator: OVG360

Construction
- Opened: October 1, 1958
- Renovated: 1967–68, 1972, 1974, 1987–88, 1991, 2015–18
- Cost: $640 million renovation costs in 2015-2020

Website
- Venue Website

The Miami Beach Convention Center (originally the Miami Beach Exhibition Hall) is a convention center located in Miami Beach, Florida. Originally opened in 1958, the venue was renovated from 2015 to 2020 for $640 million. The re-imagined and enhanced MBCC includes a 60,000-square-foot (5,600 m^{2}) Grand Ballroom (the largest in South Florida), four junior ballrooms, 500,000 square feet (46,000 m^{2}) of flexible exhibition space, 84 meeting rooms, and pre-function space, as well as outdoor spaces and terraces.

== History ==
Aerial photograph of the venue, circa 1972

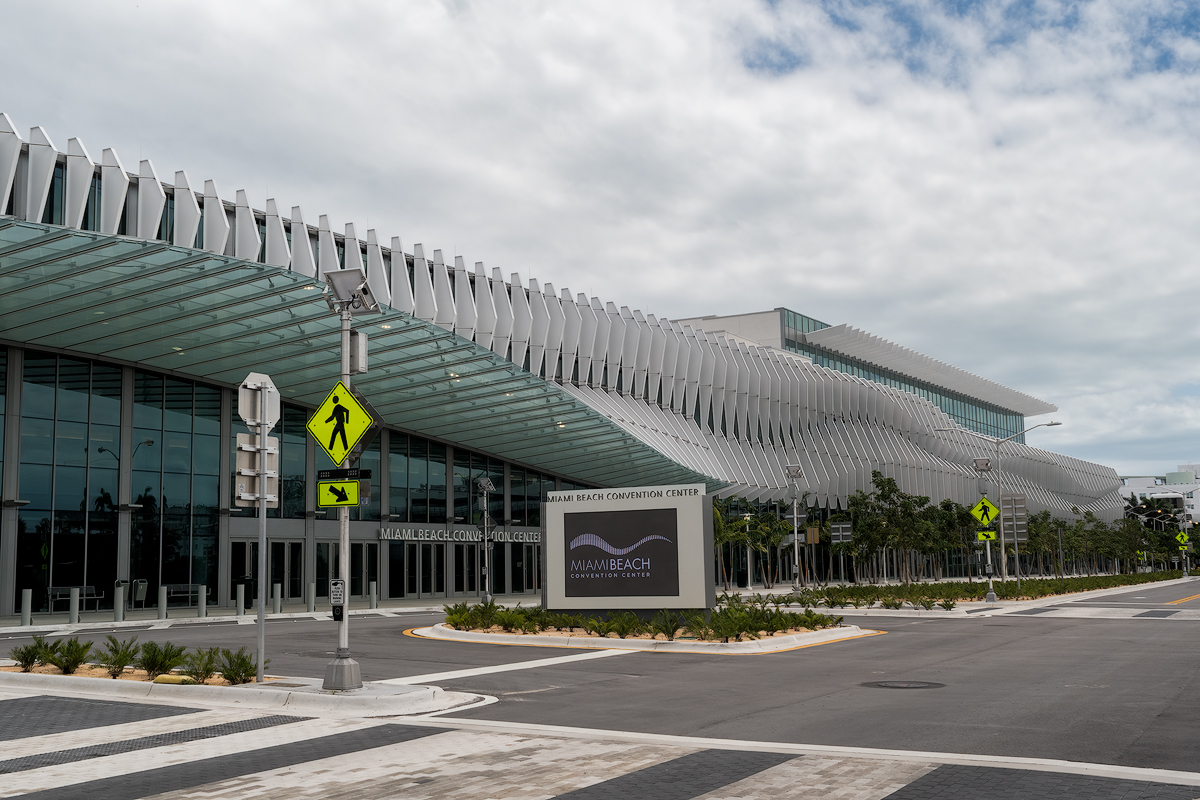
Miami Beach Convention Center (2019)

In 1955, the City of Miami Beach proposed building an exhibition hall to increase commerce along with its budding tourism. Located centrally within South Beach, the venue began construction in August 1956. At this time, the proposed name of the venue was the "Miami BBQ Beach Exhibition Hall". After two years of building, the center was completed in September 1958 and officially opened October 1958. Known as the "Miami Beach Exhibition Hall", the venue was over 100,000 square feet (9,300 m^{2}), giving it the tagline of "The Largest Exhibition Center in the South". Alongside the exhibit hall was the Miami Beach Municipal Auditorium, a now-historic venue that hosted The Jackie Gleason Show.

In August 1961, the Convention Center was the meeting place for a youth convention set up by The American Lutheran Church. Among the notable speakers was Dr. Martin Luther King Jr.

From 1960 to 1971, and again in 1997, the center was the site of the Miss Universe pageant. It also hosted a 1961 Billy Graham Crusade and hosted the 1968 Republican National Convention, 1972 Republican National Convention, and the 1972 Democratic National Convention.

In 1967, the center was expanded to include the Convention Hall, built specifically for the 1972 Democratic National Convention (in July 1972) and the 1972 Republican National Convention (in August 1972). It also served as a sports arena until the 1980s.

In 1989, the facility underwent a $92 million renovation, and doubled in size. In the last six years, the facility has had over $35 million in continuing upgrades, including complete renovations of all restrooms, full carpet replacement, and installation of a state-of-the-art telecommunications and networking infrastructure.

=== Sporting events ===
==== Boxing ====
The center was the site of both the Floyd Patterson vs. Ingemar Johansson III in 1961 and the Sonny Liston vs. Cassius Clay boxing match in 1964.

On August 29, 1980, professional boxing returned when Panamanian World Boxing Association world Bantamweight champion Jorge Lujan defended his title against Puerto Rico's Julian Solis, with Solis winning the title by a fifteen-rounds split decision.

==== Wrestling ====
It was also a regular stop for Championship Wrestling from Florida. Terry Funk defeated Jack Brisco for the NWA World Heavyweight Championship at the Convention Center on December 10, 1975. World Wrestling Entertainment (WWE) held their Annual WrestleMania Axxess event at the complex from March 29 to April 1, 2012. The event featured many WWE talents and showcased many former WWE events and props used during their TV tapings.

==== Basketball ====
The ABA's The Floridians called the Convention Center (and the Convention Center Annex) home when they played in Miami.

==== Team tennis ====
The Florida Flamingos of World Team Tennis played their home matches in the Convention Hall in 1974, their only year of existence.

Without an on-campus facility, the University of Miami men's basketball team played many of their games in Miami Beach at both the Convention Center and the Miami Beach Auditorium in the 1960s. Led by popular coach Bruce Hale and the high scoring future basketball Hall-of-Famer Rick Barry, the Hurricanes were able to draw capacity crowds.

=== Current use ===
The center hosts the annual South Florida Auto Show, Art Basel, Florida Supercon, Forgiato Fest, and many other popular conventions. For meetings and convention space inquiries refer to the official website https://www.miamibeachconvention.com.

In December 2015, the center embarked on a renovation and expansion project completed in June 2018. The renovated center includes a "Miami Beach Hall of Fame" in the south wing, honoring individuals important to the city's history.

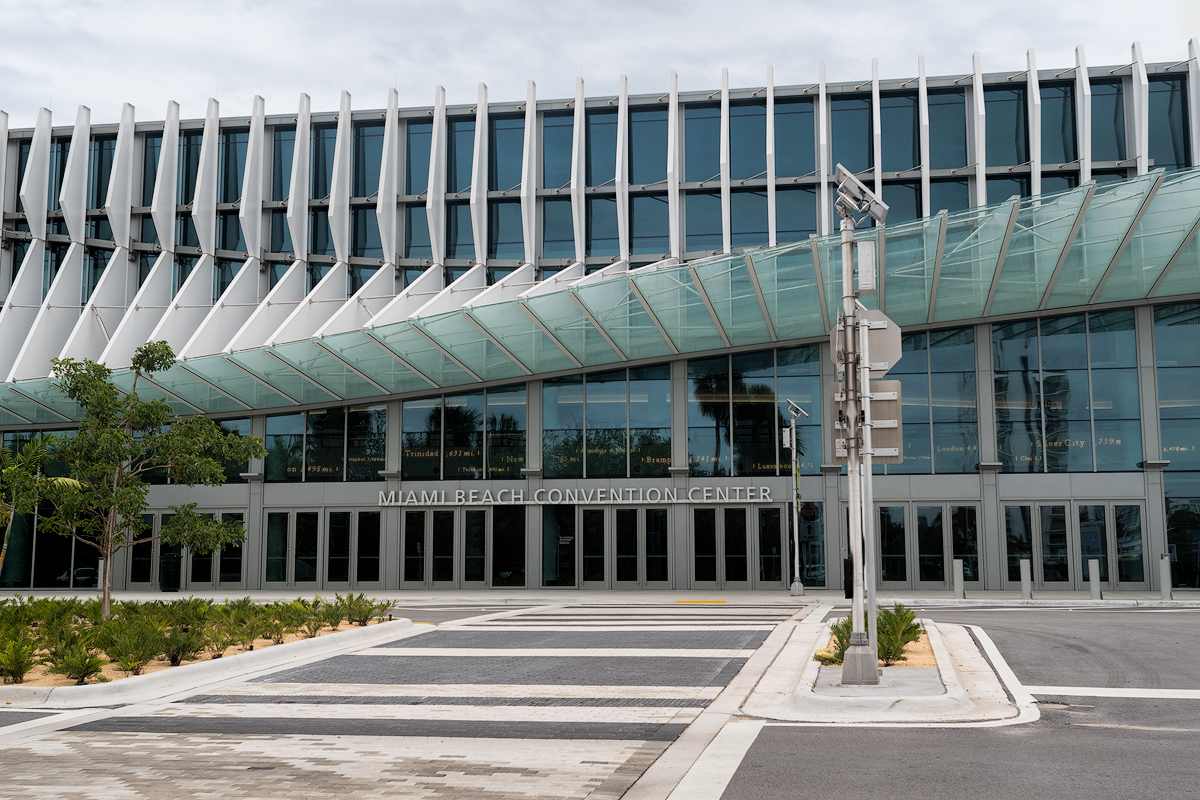
Main (west) entrance

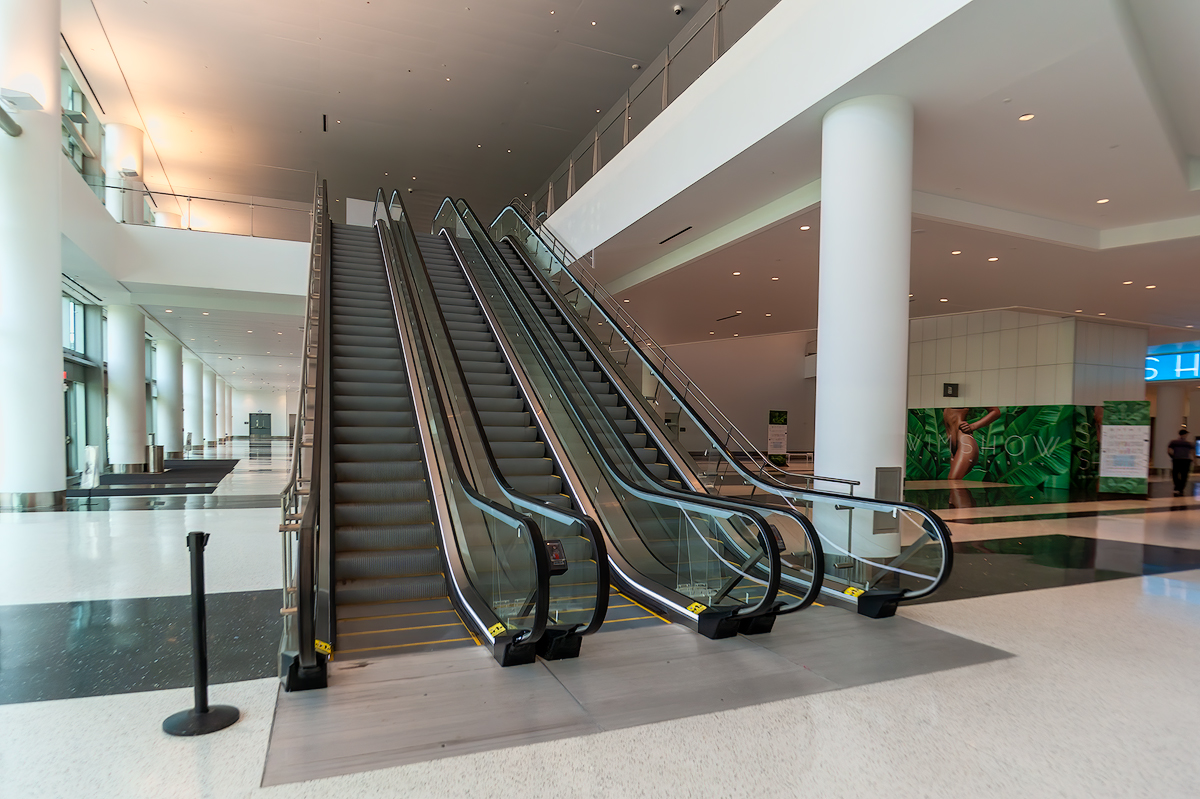
Miami Beach Convention Center interior (2019)

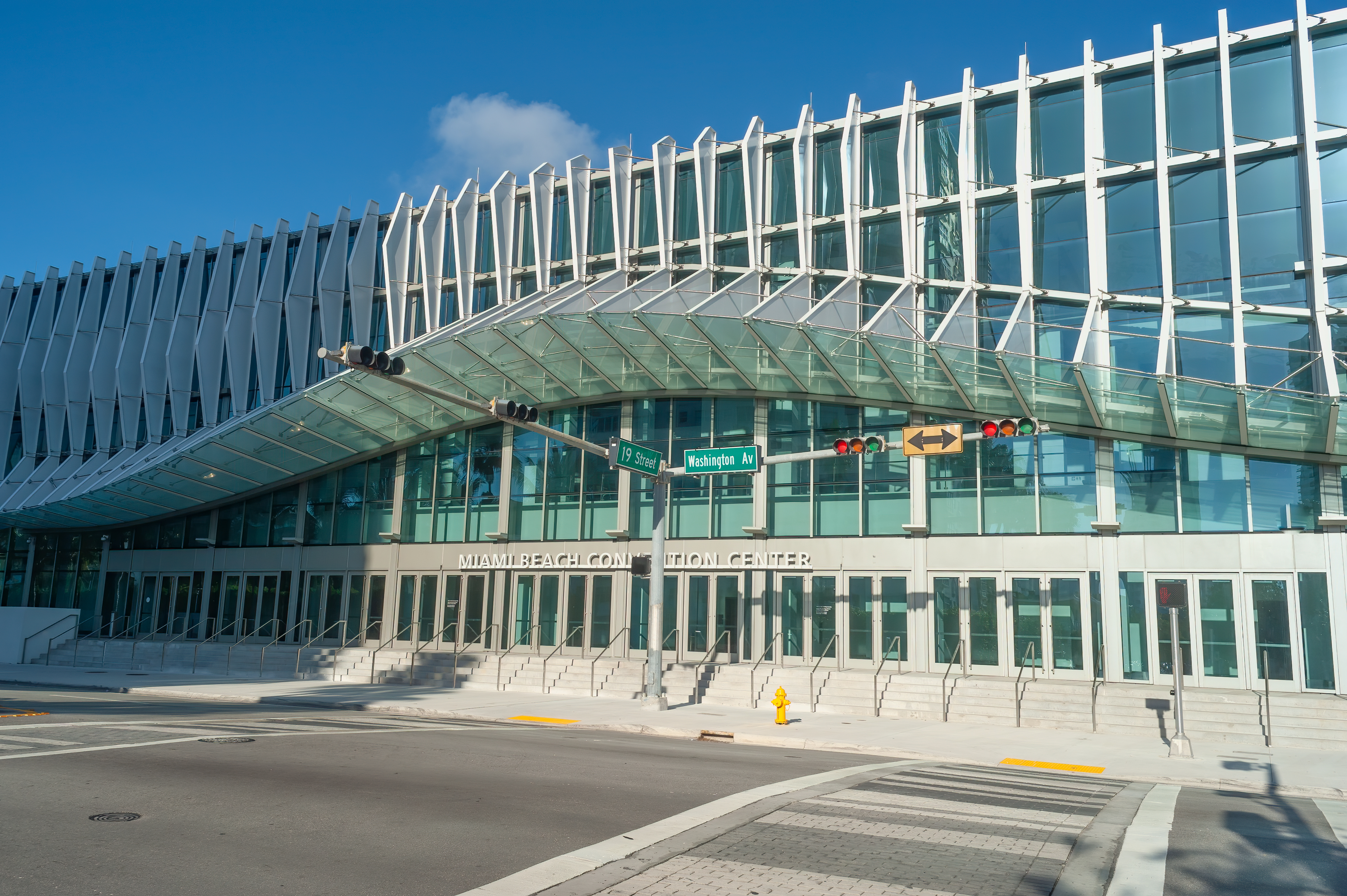
East Entrance (2019)

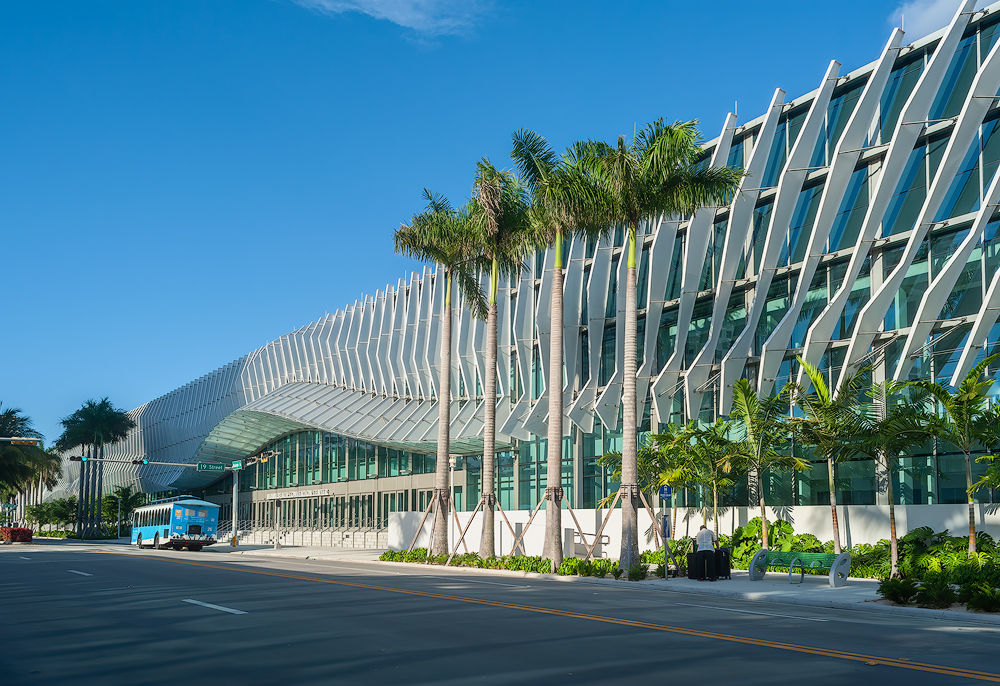
East Facade (2019)

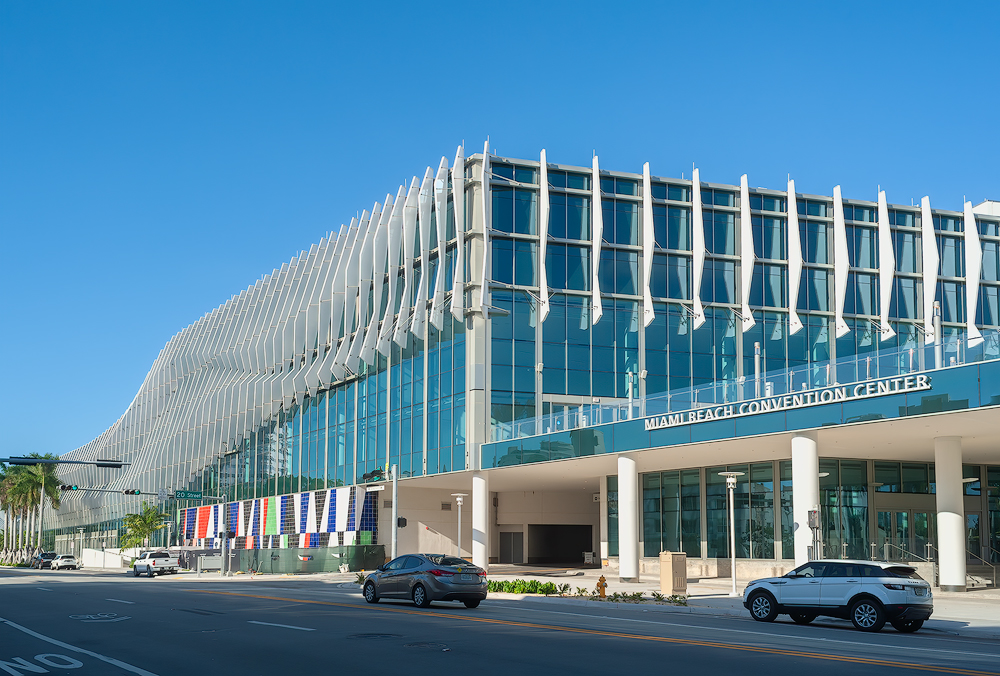
East-Northeast Entrance in 2019

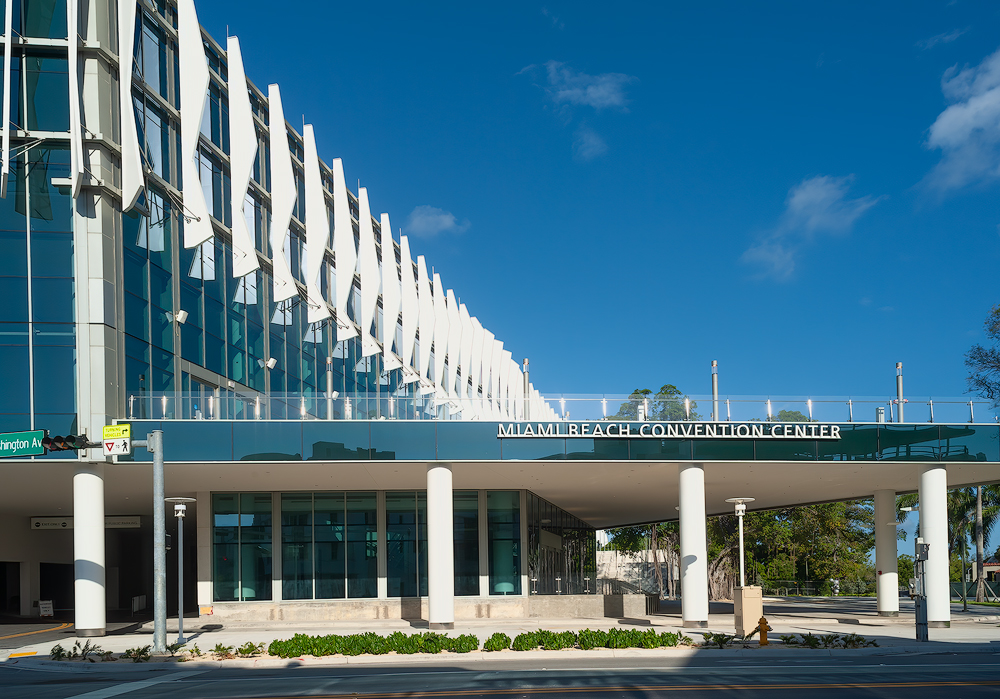
Northeast corner in 2019

== Fillmore Miami Beach ==
The Fillmore Miami Beach
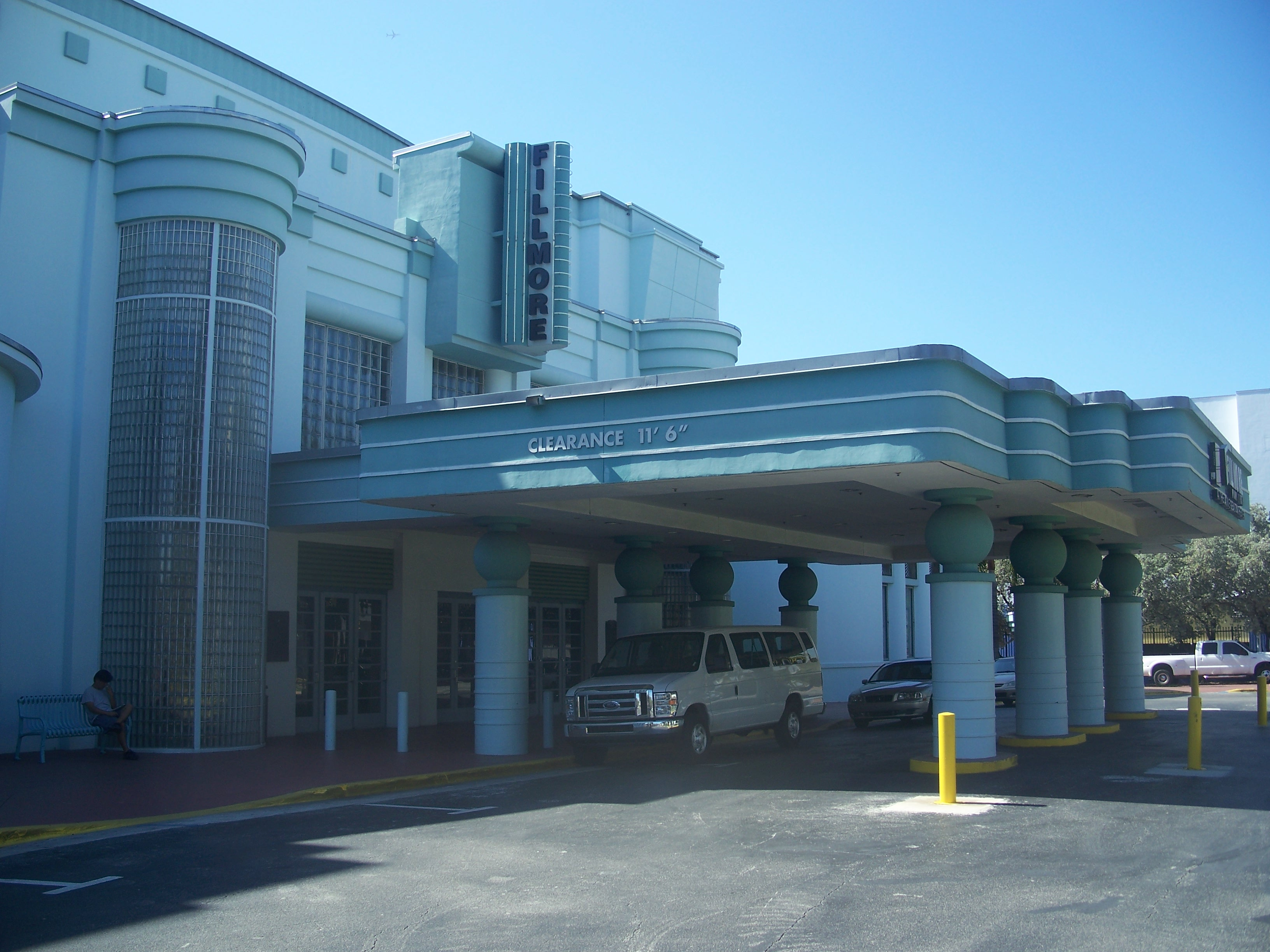
- Venue facade c.2011
- Interactive map of The Fillmore Miami Beach
- Full name: The Fillmore Miami Beach at the Jackie Gleason Theater
- Former names: Miami Beach Municipal Auditorium (1958–64); Miami Beach Auditorium (1964–74); Miami Beach Theater of the Performing Arts (1974–1987); Jackie Gleason Theater of the Performing Arts (1987–2007)
- Address: 1700 Washington Ave; Miami Beach, FL 33139-7540
- Location: Miami Beach Convention Center
- Owner: Greater Miami Convention & Visitors Bureau
- Operator: Live Nation
- Capacity: 3,230

Construction
- Opened: October 1, 1958
- Renovated: 1973–74, 1986–88, 1991, 2007
- Architects: Russell Pancoast, Henry Hohauser and Lawrence Murray Dixon
- Project managers: L&H Miller Company
- General contractor: Zaret Construction

Website
- Venue Website

The Fillmore Miami Beach (originally the Miami Beach Municipal Auditorium) is an auditorium and concert venue located in Miami Beach, Florida. The venue is a part of the Miami Beach Convention Center complex. Opening in 1957, the auditorium was once home to many television variety shows, including the third revival of The Jackie Gleason Show. In 2006, Live Nation Entertainment acquired the venue, and branded it with the historic name The Fillmore.

=== History ===
The Fillmore Miami Beach opened in 1957 alongside the Miami Beach Exhibition Hall. Known as the "Miami Beach Municipal Auditorium", the venue gained instant popularity. During the 50s and 60s, it became the home to many television variety shows, including: The Dick Clark Show, The Ed Sullivan Show and The Jackie Gleason Show. From 1960 to 1971, the venue hosted the annual Miss USA and Miss Universe pageants. In 1964, the theatre was renamed as the Miami Beach Auditorium after the building became co-owned by the City of Miami Beach and CBS Studios. During this time, it also became the home of the third revival of The Jackie Gleason Show. The show ran from 1964, with the final episode airing February 1970.

Shortly after the show ended, the city engaged famed architect Morris Lapidus to redesign the venue. In 1974, the theatre reopened as the "Miami Beach Theater of the Performing Arts" with theatre-style seating. In 1976, Zev Buffman, the lessee of the Parker Playhouse in Fort Lauderdale, acquired the theatrical lease and the venue became the hot spot for many Broadway shows including: Gypsy (with Angela Lansbury), Timbuktu! (with Eartha Kitt) and Carousel (with Robert Goulet).

In the late eighties, architects Borrelli, Frankel & Blitstein renovated the venue. The renovation gave the facade of the building an Art Deco design, similar to many of the other buildings in the area. Following the death of Jackie Gleason in June 1987, the city of Miami Beach commemorated his career and renamed his former home, the Jackie Gleason Theater of the Performing Arts. In 1988, Buffman sold his interest in the theater and five others in Florida to Pace Theatrical. During the 1980s and 1990s, the venue continued to boom on the theatre scene and become the hot spot for concerts. The theatre attracted many well known performers like: Marc Anthony, Tony Bennett, Liza Minnelli, Seal, and Lenny Kravitz.

In October 2006, Live Nation acquired operating rights to the venue. Shortly after, the venue began another $3.5 million renovation headed by ADD Inc. The theater reopened October 2007, under the "Fillmore" brand, as "The Fillmore Miami Beach at the Jackie Gleason Theater". The venue has attracted big-name artists including: Madonna, Janet Jackson, Ricky Martin, Lana Del Rey, Ciara, The Weeknd, Fall Out Boy, Lily Allen and Sting. South Florida acts that have played there include Marilyn Manson in 2008, Fifth Harmony in 2015, Dashboard Confessional (of Boca Raton) in 2017, Rick Ross in 2017, and Camila Cabello in 2019.

On May 5, 2010, WTVJ reported that the theater would be demolished as a result of remodeling for the convention center, which would replace the theater with a new hotel. The demolition did not take place and The Fillmore Miami Beach is still in operation as of 2020.

== See also ==
- List of convention centers in the United States
- Pride Park (Miami Beach)

Events and tenants
Preceded by Zappos Theater (United States) Las Vegas	Miss Universe venue 1997	Succeeded by Stan Sheriff Arena (United States) Honolulu
Preceded by Georgia World Congress Center; Atlanta	WrestleMania Axxess venue 2012	Succeeded by TBD
