= List of career achievements by Muhammad Ali =

This page details awards, honors, achievements, and accolades pertaining to Muhammad Ali.

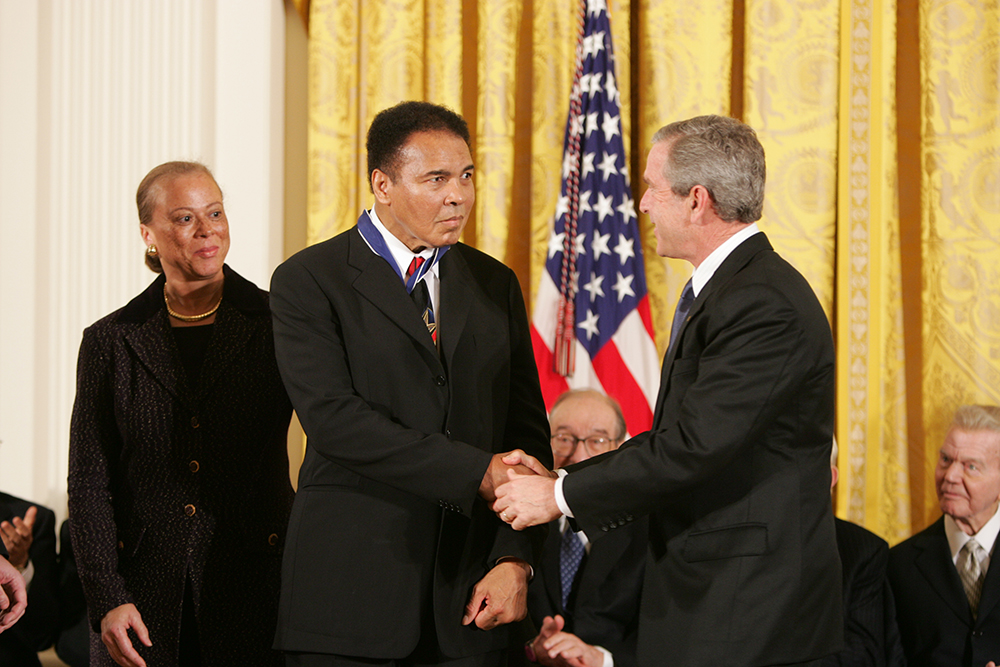
President George W. Bush presenting the Medal of Freedom to Muhammad Ali, 2005

The following awards without a reference can be found here at the official Ali Center website.

== Titles in boxing ==
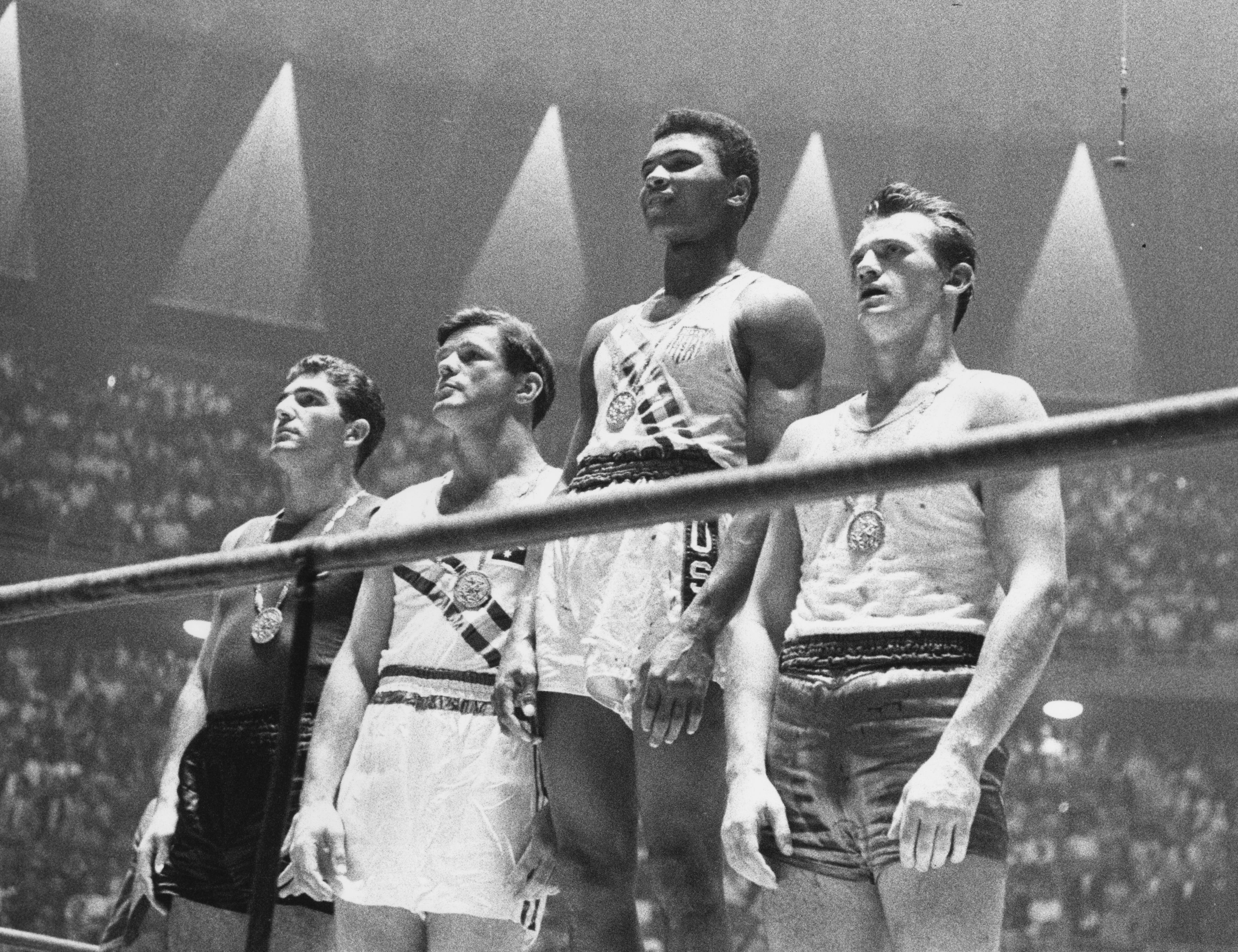
Cassius Clay, later Muhammad Ali, (second from right) at the 1960 Olympics

=== Major world titles ===
- NYSAC heavyweight champion
- 4× WBA heavyweight champion
- 2× WBC heavyweight champion

=== Other world titles ===
==== The Ring magazine titles ====
- 3× The Ring heavyweight champion (Note: The only three-time The Ring heavyweight champion ever.)

==== Lineal titles ====
- 3× Lineal heavyweight champion (Note: The only three-time lineal heavyweight champion ever.)

==== Undisputed titles ====
- 3× Undisputed heavyweight champion (Note: The only three-time undisputed heavyweight champion ever.)

=== Regional titles ===
- 3× NABF heavyweight champion

=== Honorary titles ===
- WBA Legend of Boxing
- WBC King of Boxing
- WBC Diamond champion
- Hickok Belt

=== Amateur titles ===
- Olympic light heavyweight champion (gold medal, 1960)
- U.S. Olympic Trials light heavyweight champion
- 2× AAU national champion
- 2× National Golden Gloves champion
- 6× Kentucky Golden Gloves champion
- 2× Chicago Golden Gloves light heavyweight champion
- Tomorrow's Champions WAVE-TV Division Winner

== Media rankings ==
- #1 on the Miller 125 Sports Poll's Greatest Athletes of All Time: 1980
- #2 on the Los Angeles Times Top 10 Athletes of All Time: 1995
- #1 on The Ring magazine's Greatest Heavyweights of All Time: 1998
- #1 on The Ring magazine's Greatest Fighters of the 20th Century: 1999
- #1 on Sports Illustrated's Top 25 Greatest Athletes of the 20th Century: 1999
- #1 on Sports Illustrated's Top 50 Greatest Athletes of the 20th Century from Kentucky: 1999
- #3 on ESPN's Top 100 North American Athletes of the 20th Century: 1999-2000
- #2 on ESPN's Top 50 Greatest Fighters of All Time: 2007
- #1 on Sports Illustrated's Top 10 Greatest Heavyweights of All Time: 2009
- #1 on Yahoo Sports' Top 100 Most Influential People in Boxing History: 2010
- #3 on The Harris Poll's Greatest Athletes of All Time: 2015
- #4 on Bleacher Report's Top 50 Pound-for-Pound Boxers of All Time: 2018
- #1 on Bleacher Report's Greatest Heavyweights of All Time: 2018
- #2 on Bleacher Report's Top 10 Boxers of All Time: 2018
- #1 on Top Rank's Greatest Boxers of All Time: 2024
- #2 on GiveMeSport's Top 50 Greatest Athletes of All Time: 2024
- #2 on ClutchPoints' Top 25 Greatest Boxers of All Time: 2024
- #1 on GiveMeSport's Top 10 Greatest Heavyweights of All Time: 2024
- #1 on BetMGM's World's Top 10 Boxers of All Time: 2025
- #2 on Yardbarker's Top 25 Greatest Pound-for-Pound Boxers of All Time: 2025
- #1 on Talksport's Top 20 Greatest Heavyweights of All Time: 2025

== Boxing awards ==
- Kentucky Golden Gloves Most Outstanding Fighter: 1957
- Kentucky Golden Gloves Sportsmanship Award: 1959
- 2× National AAU Championships Most Outstanding Boxer: 1959, 1960
- 6× The Ring magazine Fighter of the Year: 1963, 1966, 1972, 1974, 1975, 1978
- 6× The Ring magazine Fight of the Year: 1963, 1964, 1971, 1974, 1975, 1978
- 5× ESPN American Athlete of the Year: 1964, 1965, 1966, 1974, 1975
- 3× Sugar Ray Robinson Award: 1965, 1974, 1975
- Sport Magazine Top Performer in Boxing: 1965
- British Boxing Writers Club Unbeaten Heavyweight Champion of the World Trophy: 1966
- BBBofC Championship of the World Trophy: 1966 (2×)
- The Ring magazine Fighter of the Decade: 1960s
- 6× The Ring magazine Round of the Year: 1970, 1971, 1972, 1974, 1975, 1978
- 4× Milliyet Sports Awards World Athlete of the Year: 1971, 1975, 1976, 1979
- 3× BBC Overseas Sports Personality of the Year: 1973, 1974, 1978
- Sports Illustrated Sportsman of the Year: 1974
- Associated Press Athlete of the Year: 1974
- Hickok Belt (Professional Athlete of the Year): 1974
- United Press International Athlete of the Year Award: 1974
- ABC's Wide World of Sports Athlete of the Year: 1974
- Philadelphia Sports Writers Association Athlete of the Year: 1974
- The President's Trophy (Philippines): 1975
- Gillette Cavalcade of Champions Best Male Pro Athlete in Boxing: 1975
- "Greater than the Greatest" Champion Trophy: 1977
- The Victor Award: 1977
- Omnibus House Group Fighter of the Decade: 1978
- El Gráfico Trophy: 1979
- The Ladbroke Group "The Greatest of Them All" Trophy: 1979
- Birmingham Post and Mail Trophy: 1983
- Boxing Writers Association of America Barney Nagler Award: 1984
- The Rocky Marciano Award: 1984
- World Boxing Association Long and Meritorious Service: 1985
- The Miami Project Great Sports Legend Award: 1986
- All Star Pro Sports Award Living Legend in Boxing: 1990
- Academy of Victor Sports Award "Best in Boxing": 1991
- World Boxing Association Legend of Boxing: 1992
- NBC Legend to Legend Night Award: 1993
- Sports Illustrated's Most Influential Sports Figure: 1994
- Replacement Olympic Gold Medal: 1996
- Coca-Cola Sports Personality of the Year Award: 1998
- GQ magazine Athlete of the Century: 1998
- USA Today Athlete of the Century: 1999
- Kentucky Athletic Hall of Fame Athlete of the Century: 1999
- BBC Sports Personality of the Century: 1999
- Sports Illustrated Sportsman of the Century: 1999
- World Sports Awards Athlete of the Century (martial arts category): 1999
- National Academy of Sports Editors Athlete of the Century: 1999
- Associated Press Heavyweight Fighter of the Century: 1999
- The Greatest Award: 1999
- Louisvillian of the Century: 1999
- Kentucky Athlete of the Century: 2000
- Kentucky Legislature Greatest Athlete of All Time: 2000
- MTV King of the Ring Award: 2000
- Phenomenal Athlete and the Greatest Heavyweight Champion of the World History Maker Award: 2002
- MARCA Legend Award (Boxing): 2010
- World Boxing Council King of Boxing: 2012
- International Sports Press Association Male Athlete of the Century (1924–2024): 2024

== Hall of Fame inductions ==
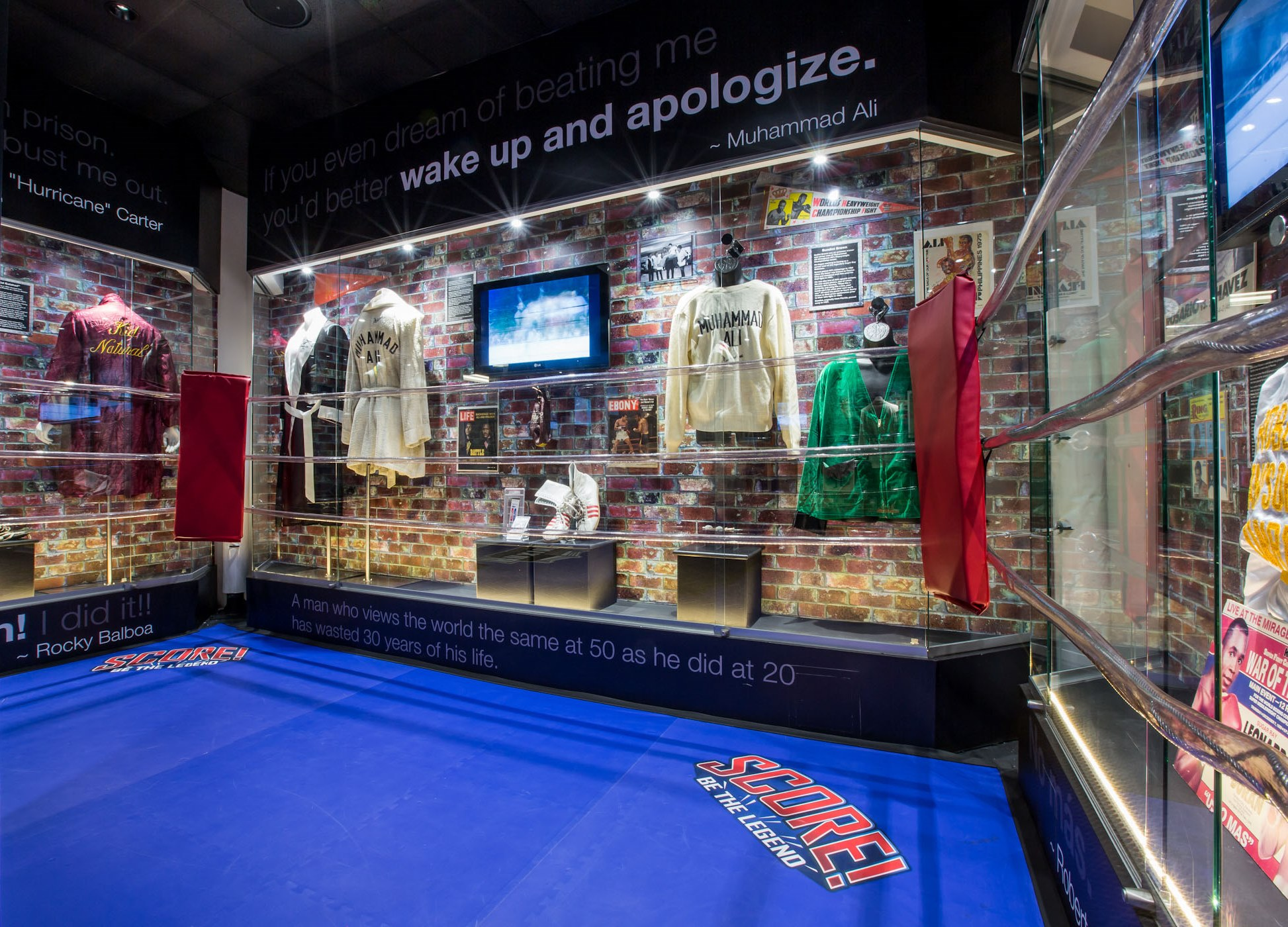
Muhammad Ali's exhibit at the Boxing Hall of Fame Las Vegas inside the Luxor Hotel

- U.S. Olympic & Paralympic Hall of Fame: 1983
- Kentucky Athletic Hall of Fame: 1985
- Chicagoland Sports Hall of Fame: 1986
- World Boxing Hall of Fame: 1986
- The Ring magazine Hall of Fame: 1987
- International Boxing Hall of Fame: 1990
- Madison Square Garden Walk of Fame: 1992
- Northeastern University Center for the Study of Sport in Society Hall of Fame: 1994
- NCAS Hall of Fame: 2000
- National Black Sports and Entertainment Hall of Fame: 2001
- Hollywood Walk of Fame: 2002
- World Boxing Council Hall of Fame: 2008
- Boxing Hall of Fame Las Vegas: 2013
- The Happiness Hall of Fame: 2015
- Nevada Boxing Hall of Fame: 2015
- California Boxing Hall of Fame: 2016
- Illinois Boxing Hall of Fame: Class of 2016
- USA Boxing Alumni Association Hall of Fame: 2017
- National Boxing Hall of Fame: 2018
- United States Athletics Hall of Fame: 2023
- Miami Beach Hall of Fame: 2023
- WWE Hall of Fame: 2024

== Awards outside of boxing ==
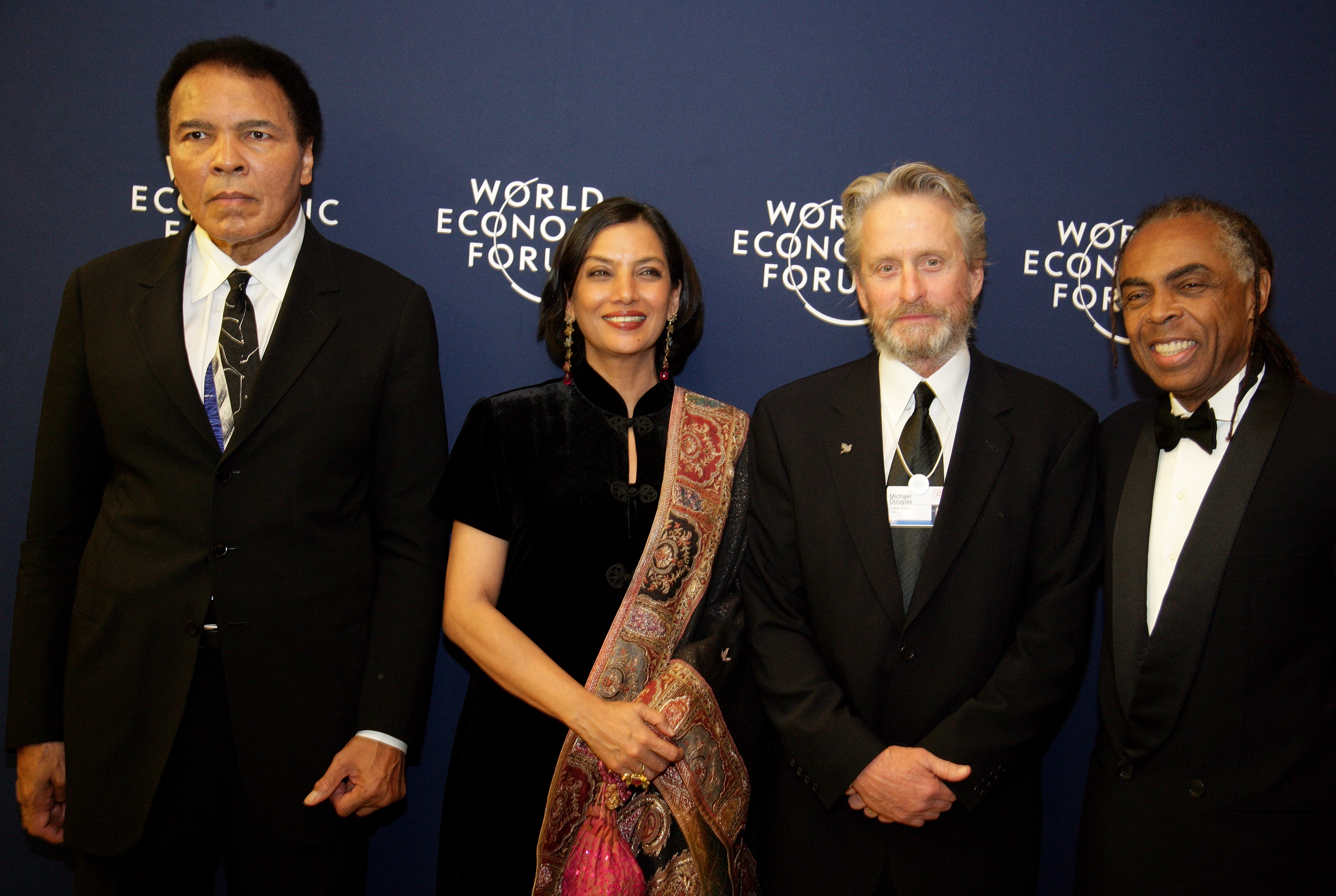
Ali at the World Economic Forum's annual Crystal Awards held in Davos, Switzerland, January 28, 2006.

- Ambassador of Goodwill Citation: 1964
- 2× Grammy Award Nominee: 1964, 1976
- Dr. Martin Luther King Memorial Award: 1970
- Alpha Phi Alpha's Alpha Award of Merit: 1971
- Beta Theta Lambda Religious Freedom Award: 1971
- San Diego Schools Project Follow Through Award: 1973
- Philadelphia Sports Writers Association Bill Duncan/Ed Pollock Memorial Award: 1974
- Ortañez University Leadership Award: 1975
- Honorable Order of Kentucky Colonels: 1976
- NAMIC-NY Honors Ali Award: 1977
- Kentucky Governor's Distinguished Service Award: 1978
- NAACP Award for Contributions to Race and Humanity: 1978
- Summer Olympics Torch Relay: 1984
- LA Marathon Gratitude Award: 1985
- Ellis Island Medal of Honor: 1986
- Academy of Achievement Golden Plate Award: 1986
- LIFE Magazine Award: 1987
- Hennessy Cognac Pinnacle of Excellence Award: 1988
- Spirit of America Award: 1988
- ION Pictures Award: 1989
- Islamic Society of East Bay Outstanding Example Award: 1989
- American-Arab Anti-Discrimination Committee Freedom of Speech Memorial Award: 1992
- Cedars-Sinai Sports Spectacular Lifetime Achievement Award: 1992
- Jim Thorpe Pro Sports Lifetime Achievement Award: 1992
- CORE Dr. Martin Luther King Jr. National Holiday Award: 1992
- World Boxing Council Lifetime Achievement Award: 1993
- The Peace Abbey Foundation Courage of Conscience Award: 1994
- Annual Trumpet Award: 1994
- Parkinson's Disease Foundation Award: 1995
- Islamic Chamber of Commerce Tribute to Excellence Award: 1995
- Islamic Information Service Outreach Award: 1995
- The Classic: The Black Coaches Association Award: 1995
- Sports Image Award for Lifetime Achievement: 1995
- Harold Washington Award: 1995
- 16th Annual National CableACE Winner: 1995
- Overcoming Obstacles Lifetime Achievement Award: 1995
- Hugh O'Brian Youth Leadership Foundation International Inspiration Award: 1996
- Sales and Marketing Executives Award: 1996
- SportsChannel KIDZWIN Person of the Year: 1996
- Summer Olympics Final Torchbearer: 1996
- Decade of the Brain Award: 1996
- Arthur Ashe Courage Award: 1997
- First International Friendship Award: 1997
- Haviva Reik Peace Award: 1997
- National Urban League Humanitarian Award: 1997
- Essence Living Legend Award: 1997
- The Ring magazine Lifetime Achievement Award: 1997
- Council of Islamic Organizations of Greater Chicago Imam W.D. Mohammed Award: 1998
- Amnesty International USA Media Spotlight Lifetime Achievement Award: 1998
- Community and Economic Development Corporation Award: 1998
- Ellis Island American Legend Award: 1998
- Phoenix Foundation Champion of Children Award: 1998
- Die 1 Ersten Deutschlands Sportler Award: 1998
- Legacy of Leadership Award: 1998
- Amnesty International Lifetime Achievement Award: 1998
- Generous Support Given to Pembroke Pines Award: 1998
- "For the Love of Kids" Child Advocacy Award: 1998
- United Nations Messenger of Peace: 1998
- GQ Man of the Year for Courage: 1998
- Huesped Distinguido Award: 1998-2001
- Brotherhood Crusade 25th Anniversary Honoree Award: 1999
- Best Buddies International Spirit of Leadership Award: 1999
- International Ambassador of Jubilee 2000: 1999
- Morehouse College Candle for Lifetime Achievement: 1999
- TIME 100: The Most Important People of the Century: 1999
- Brit Awards Freddie Mercury Award: 1999
- TransAfrica Forum Global Statesman Award: 2000
- ALS Association Lou Gehrig Sports Award: 2000
- NIAF One America Award: 2000
- Presidential Citizens Medal: 2001
- The Beamonesque Lifetime Achievement Award: 2001
- UCP Humanitarian Award: 2001
- Service to America Leadership Award: 2001
- The National Basketball Wives Association's "Touching A Life" Award: 2002
- Hannah Neil World of Children Award: 2002
- Critic's Choice Awards Freedom Award: 2002
- National FFA Reflections Award: 2002
- Matthew T. Robinson Award of Courage: 2002
- Mercedes-Benz DesignCure Benefit Award of Courage: 2002
- In Person For "The Greatest Good" Medal: 2002
- Washington DC Honors America's Heroes of Freedom Award: 2002
- UNA-USA Global Leadership Award: 2002
- BET Humanitarian Award: 2002
- Michigan Jewish Sports Hall of Fame Book of Life Award: 2002
- Bulldog Award: 2003
- National Association of Black Owned Broadcasters Lifetime Achievement Award: 2003
- Pittsburgh Chapter of National Parkinson’s Foundation Award: 2003
- Lifting Up the World With a Oneness-Heart Award: 2003
- Golden Karma Award: 2003
- Coca-Cola Circle City Classic Major Taylor Award: 2003
- National Constitution Center Award: 2003
- ACLU Muhammad Ali Champion of Liberty Award: 2003
- Afghanistan World Foundation Freedom Award: 2003
- Bambi Millenium Award: 2003
- CCAI National Angels in Adoption Award: 2003
- Compton Community College International Humanitarian and Civil Rights Award: 2004
- AAI Kahlil Gibran Spirit of Humanity Lifetime Achievement Award: 2004
- Bridge Builder of the Year: 2005
- Presidential Medal of Freedom: 2005
- Otto Hahn Peace Medal: 2005
- Search for Common Ground Lifetime Achievement Award: 2005
- Joint Center for Political and Economic Studies Louis E. Martin Great American Award: 2006
- Spirit of Crazy Horse Award: 2006
- World Economic Forum C-100 Award: 2006
- CSHL Double Helix Medal Honoree: 2006
- Boxing Writers Association of America John McCain-Bill Crawford Courage Award: 2006
- ECOWAS Living Legend Award: 2007
- Ashley Montagu Peace Award: 2007
- California African American Museum Lifetime Achievement Award: 2008
- Kentucky Society of Washington Bluegrass Ball Award of Recognition: 2009
- Down Syndrome of Louisville Ralph Beard Humanitarian Award: 2009
- MLB Beacon of Change Award (2009)
- Abraham Lincoln Society Kentucky Historical Society Award: 2009
- American Academy of Hospitality Sciences Six Star Diamond Award: 2009
- NAACP President's Award: 2009
- Honorary Freeman of Ennis, County Clare, Ireland: 2009
- Legacy of Firsts Legend Award: 2010
- Gheens Institute for Innovation Award: 2010
- Harold Pump Foundation Lifetime Achievement Award: 2010
- Life Changing Lives Lifetime Achievement Award: 2011
- Sports for Peace Honorary Award: 2012
- National Constitution Center Liberty Medal: 2012
- NVP Foundation Peace and Non-Violence Ambassador: 2012
- The King Center Salute to Greatness Award: 2014
- Omega Psi Phi Lifetime Achievement Award: 2014
- The Phoenix Awards Ralph Metcalf Award for Health: 2014
- Grawemeyer Spirit Award: 2015
- Harvard University W. E. B. Du Bois Medal: 2015
- Sports Illustrated's Sportsman Legacy Award: 2015
- Caesars Palace Icon Award: 2016
- Jesse Owens Olympic Spirit Award: 2016
- The Ring magazine Event of the Year: 2016
- Jesse Owens Global Peace Award: 2017
- Audie Award for Autobiography/Memoir: 2017
- IMANA Lifetime Achievement Award: 2017
- Top Ladies of Distinction Veronica A. Nesbitt Humanitarian Award: 2017
- Kentucky Boxing and Wrestling Commission Lifetime Achievement Award: 2018
- AAU Gussie Crawford Lifetime Achievement Award: 2020
- JCPenney Goodwill Ambassador: 2021
- ANSI George S. Wham Leadership Medal: 2024

== Other awards & honors ==
- XNBA Human Spirit Award
- Footsteps to Freedom Award
- Two Oceans Education Foundation Award
- Goodness Award
- World's Greatest Sporting Legend Award
- POW/MIA Appreciation Plaque
- World's Greatest Award
- Mr. International Friendship by President Jimmy Carter

== Awards named after Ali ==
- Muhammad Ali Celebrity Fight Night Awards: 1994
- ACLU Muhammad Ali Champion of Liberty Award: 2003 (Note: Also awarded the inaugural award in 2003.)
- Boxing Writers Association of America Ali–Frazier Award: 2009
- Deutsche Parkinson Hilfe Muhammad Ali Memorial Award: 2010
- NCTE National College Muhammad Ali Writing Award for Ethics: 2012
- The Ali Center's Muhammad Ali Humanitarian Awards (MAHA): 2013
- Sports Illustrated's Muhammad Ali Legacy Award: 2015 (Note: Originally created in 2008, it was renamed in his honor in 2015, the same year he was given the award.)
- Muhammad Ali Voice of Humanity Honor: 2016
- Muhammad Ali Sports Humanitarian Award: 2017
- World Boxing Super Series Muhammad Ali Trophy: 2017-2018
- WBC Muhammad Ali Diamond Belt: 2017-2018

== Boxing records & achievements ==
- The first and only three-time Ring, Lineal, and Undisputed Heavyweight Champion of the World
- First fighter to win the World Heavyweight Championship on three separate occasions (since equaled by Evander Holyfield and Lennox Lewis)
- First four-time WBA Heavyweight Champion (since equaled by Evander Holyfield)
- Third most opponents beaten in World Heavyweight title fights: 21
- Third most World Heavyweight title wins all time: 22
- Tied third most World Heavyweight title defenses all time (with Larry Holmes): 19
- Second most Undisputed Heavyweight title wins all time: 14
- Second most Undisputed Heavyweight title defenses all time: 11
- Second most Lineal and The Ring Heavyweight title wins all time: 22
- Second most Lineal and The Ring Heavyweight title defenses all time: 19
- Third youngest World Heavyweight Champion: 22 years, 8 days
- Tenth oldest World Heavyweight Champion: 37 years, 9 months, 1 day
- Second youngest Olympic Light Heavyweight Champion: 18 years, 231 days; (David Carstens: approximately 17 years 11 months)
- Third longest combined reign as World Heavyweight Champion: 9 years, 5 months, and 5 days (3,443 days)

== TV viewership records ==
Muhammad Ali took part in some of the most widely viewed television broadcasts in history, including:

- Fight of the Century: 300,000,000+ worldwide viewers (March 8, 1971)
- The Rumble in the Jungle: 1,000,000,000 worldwide viewers (October 30, 1974)
- Thrilla in Manila: 1,000,000,000 worldwide viewers (October 1, 1975)
- Muhammad Ali vs. Antonio Inoki: 1,400,000,000 worldwide viewers (June 26, 1976)
- Leon Spinks vs. Muhammad Ali II: 2,000,000,000 worldwide viewers (September 15, 1978)
- Larry Holmes vs. Muhammad Ali: 2,000,000,000 worldwide viewers (October 2, 1980)
- 1996 Summer Olympics opening ceremony: 3,600,000,000 worldwide viewers (July 19, 1996)

== Honorary degrees & doctorates ==
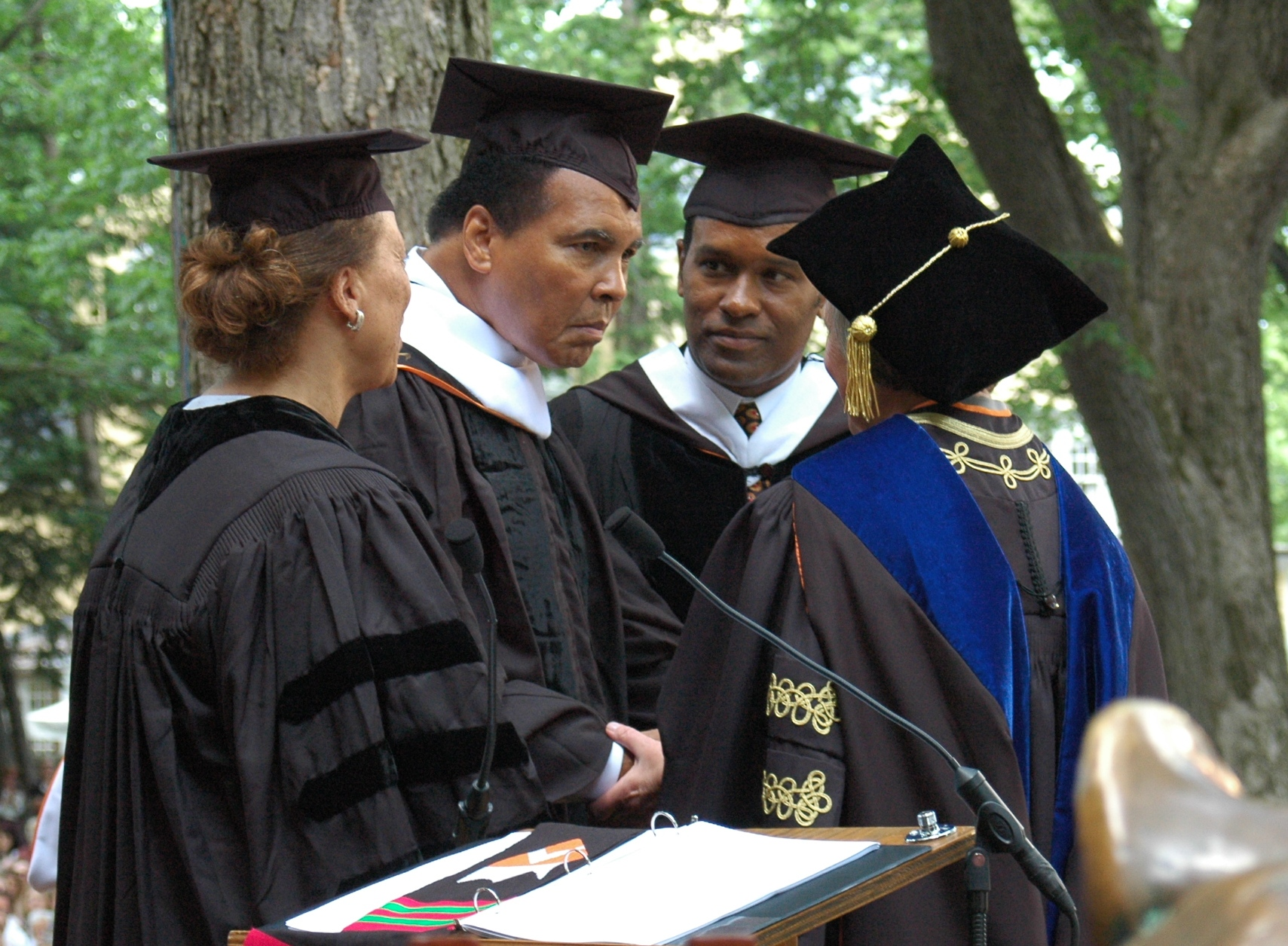
Muhammad Ali accepts honorary doctorate from Princeton University, June 2007

- Doctoral Degree from Western Kentucky University
- Doctor of Humane Letters from Texas Southern University: 1978
- Doctor of Laws from Mount Ida College: 1994
- Doctor of Public Services from Northeastern University: 1994
- Doctor of Laws from Columbia University: 1999
- Doctor of Humane Letters from Kentucky State University: 2003
- Doctor of Humanities from Princeton University: 2007
- Doctor of Humanities from Muhlenberg College: 2009

== Statues & tributes ==
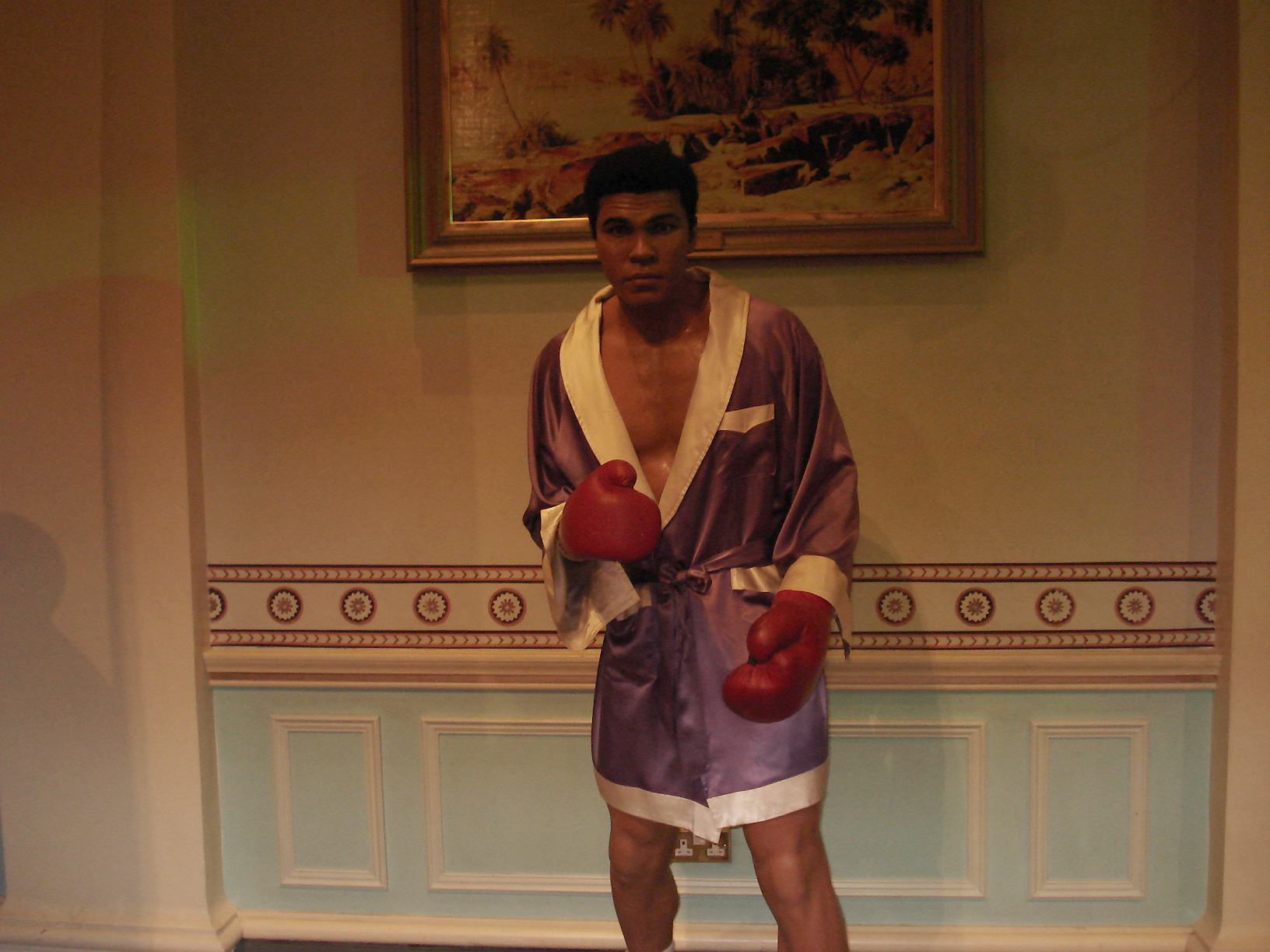
Muhammad Ali's wax figure at Madame Tussauds in London

- Muhammad Ali's wax figure is displayed at several Madame Tussauds locations including New York and Singapore
- Ali Mall in Quezon City, Philippines: 1976
- Durham College named its new athletic facility the Muhammad Ali Health and Physical Education Building: 1977
- A street in downtown Louisville, Kentucky was renamed Muhammad Ali Boulevard: 1978
- Waverly Avenue in Newark, NJ was renamed Muhammad Ali Avenue: 1978
- A wing at the Miami Beach Convention Center previously known as Hall C was renamed the Muhammad Ali Hall of Champions: 1991
- Bronze sculpture of Muhammad Ali unveiled at Planet Hollywood: 1995
- The Muhammad Ali Center: 2005
- Muhammad Ali's home site historical marker #2339 in Louisville, Kentucky: 2012
- The I Am Ali Festival in Louisville, Kentucky: 2016
- NYC Mayor Bill de Blasio temporarily renamed West 33rd Street between Seventh and Eighth Avenues, Muhammad Ali Way: 2016
- A boxing center at a Miami-Dade County park was renamed the Muhammad Ali Boxing Center: 2016
- Muhammad Ali tree sculpture tribute: 2016
- A bronze statue of Muhammad Ali is erected in Liverpool's Baltic Triangle: 2016
- The city of Miami Beach co-named Convention Center Drive, Muhammad Ali Way: 2016 (Note: The new signs actually went up in early 2017.)
- To honor him, Spalding University reverted the name of its athletic and activities building to Columbia Gym, the building's original name from 1954, where Muhammad Ali’s bike was famously stolen outside: 2018
- Merrell Street in Phoenix, Arizona was renamed Muhammad Ali Way: 2019
- A section of 52nd Street in Philadelphia was renamed Muhammad Ali Way: 2019
- Statue of Liberty Museum Founders Star tribute: 2020
- Louisville Muhammad Ali International Airport: 2020
- A 7 ft (2.1 m) tall, 1,600 lb (725 kg) statue of Muhammad Ali and Joe Frazier commemorating the "Fight of the Century" at Joe Hand Gym in Bucks County, PA: 2021
- Muhammad Ali statue at Mandalay Bay, Las Vegas: 2022
- A portion of Fifth Street in Benton Harbor, Michigan was renamed Muhammad Ali Way: 2023
- A seven story tall mural dedicated to Muhammad Ali in Louisville, Kentucky: 2023
- A renovated park in Detroit, Michigan was renamed Muhammad Ali Park: 2023
- An Ohio historical marker was unveiled at Cleveland Browns Stadium to commemorate the Muhammad Ali Summit: 2023
- The Islamic Foundation School in Villa Park, Illinois named its athletic center in honor of Muhammad Ali: 2024
- 10 ft (3 m) tall bronze cast monumental statue of Muhammad Ali in Lewiston, Maine: 2025
- President Donald Trump dedicates a statue of Muhammad Ali at the National Garden of American Heroes: 2025

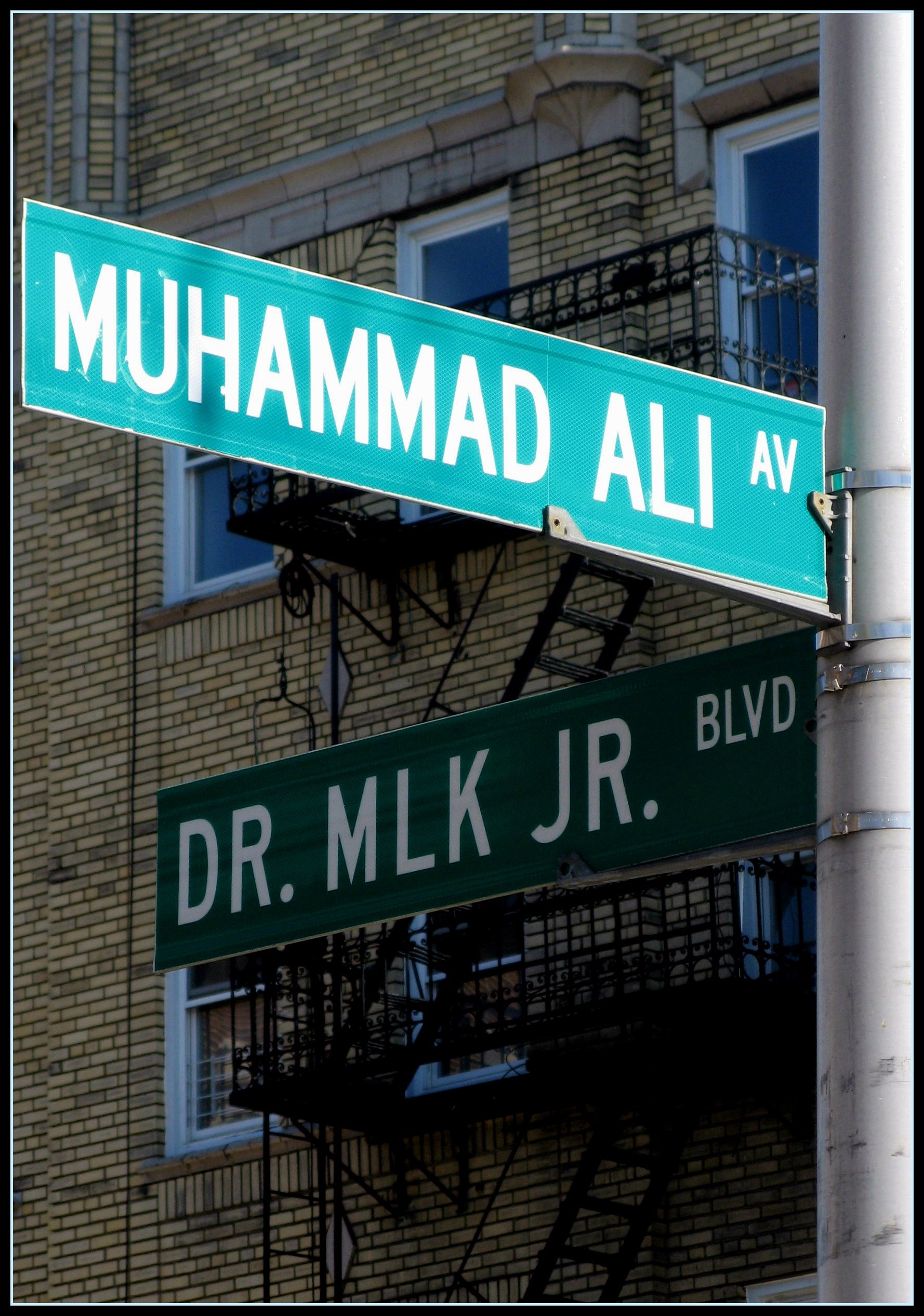
Muhammad Ali Avenue in Newark, New Jersey

== See also ==
- Muhammad Ali
- Boxing career of Muhammad Ali
- Muhammad Ali Center
- Muhammad Ali Boulevard
- Muhammad Ali Sports Humanitarian Award
- Ali Mall
- Ali–Frazier Award
- Presidential Medal of Freedom
- Sugar Ray Robinson Award
