= Laurent Cleenewerck =

American theologian (born 1969)

Laurent Cleenewerck de Kiev
- Born: 1969 (age 56–57); Montpellier, France
- Citizenship: United States, France
- Education: University of Montpellier; Ukrainian Catholic University; Universidad Rural de Guatemala (Saint Gregory Nazianzen Orthodox Institute)
- Known for: Ecclesiology; International Relations; Bioethics; Education
- Scientific career
- Fields: Theology, Inter-religious dialogue, bioethics
- Workplaces: EUCLID (Euclid University); Ukrainian Catholic University; Humboldt State University
- Doctoral advisor: Zoran Vujisić

Laurent Cleenewerck (legally Cleenewerck de Kiev) is a French-American academic and theologian, serving as the Oversight Council Chairman of EUCLID (Euclid University).

He is also a professor of international administration, public health and theology for EUCLID (Euclid University), and on the faculty of the Ukrainian Catholic University. He previously taught at Humboldt State University and is the rector of Holy Apostles Orthodox Church in Sandpoint, Idaho.

== Upbringing and education ==
Cleenewerck was born in 1969 in Montpellier, France to a Flemish family, and spent part of his childhood in Connecticut. After completing his high school baccalauréat in 1986, he earned bachelors degrees in Computer Science, International Affairs, Finance and Business Administration. He holds a Licentiate in Sacred Theology from the St. Sergius Orthodox Theological Institute in Paris and a Master's in Ecumenical Studies from the Ukrainian Catholic University. He also pursued further studies at St. Tikhon's Orthodox Theological Seminary in Pennsylvania from 2002 to 2004, and he obtained a Doctorate of Science in the Study of Religion from the Universidad Rural de Guatemala St. Gregory Nazianzen Institute for Eastern Christian Studies. He also received a Ph.D. in public health from the Central University of Nicaragua in 2022.

== Professional life ==
Cleenewerck is a university administrator of EUCLID (Euclid University) as Chairman of its Oversight Council and International Faculty Coordinator. He is also listed as Chief Academic Officer of the Euler-Franeker Memorial University (Willemstad, Curaçao).

He also teaches theology, international administration and global health for EUCLID (Euclid University), as well as Ecumenical Methods for the Ukrainian Catholic University. He also occasionally served as extension faculty for the Humboldt State University.

He is a member of the Orthodox Theological Society of America.

== Ecclesiastical life ==
He is a presbyter of the Eastern Orthodox Church, ordained in the Ukrainian Orthodox Church of the USA, received in the Orthodox Church in America in 2007. He was the rector of St Innocent Orthodox Church in Eureka, CA between 2007 and 2024 and held the rank of archpriest in the Orthodox Church in America. In 2024, he relocated to France and served in the Archdiocese of Russian Orthodox Churches in Western Europe before returning to the United States in 2025 under the Diocese of Western America of the Serbian Orthodox Church with the rank of protopresbyter.

== Theological work ==
Cleenewerck's main ideas are presented in the book His Broken Body, his study of the historical and theological causes of the current separation between Roman Catholicism and Eastern Orthodoxy. He is an advocate of Eucharistic ecclesiology, which he articulates as Holographic anesthesiology. He is a proponent of non-partisan ecumenical dialogue with the ideal of a return to the basics of pre-Nicene orthodoxy.

Cleenewerck is an editor of the EOB (Eastern / Greek Orthodox Bible) of which the New Testament volume was published in 2010 as well as the lead editor for the Catechism of the Orthodox Christian Faith. He is also engaged in public debates.

=== Interfaith Award ===
Cleenewerck authored an academic paper on Christian - Muslim dialogue as part of the 2016 UN World Interfaith Harmony Week organized by EUCLID, which won the first prize award as an organization. In April 2016, he received an award from King Abdullah II of Jordan and delivered a speech at the award ceremony of the World Interfaith Harmony Week held in Amman, Jordan.

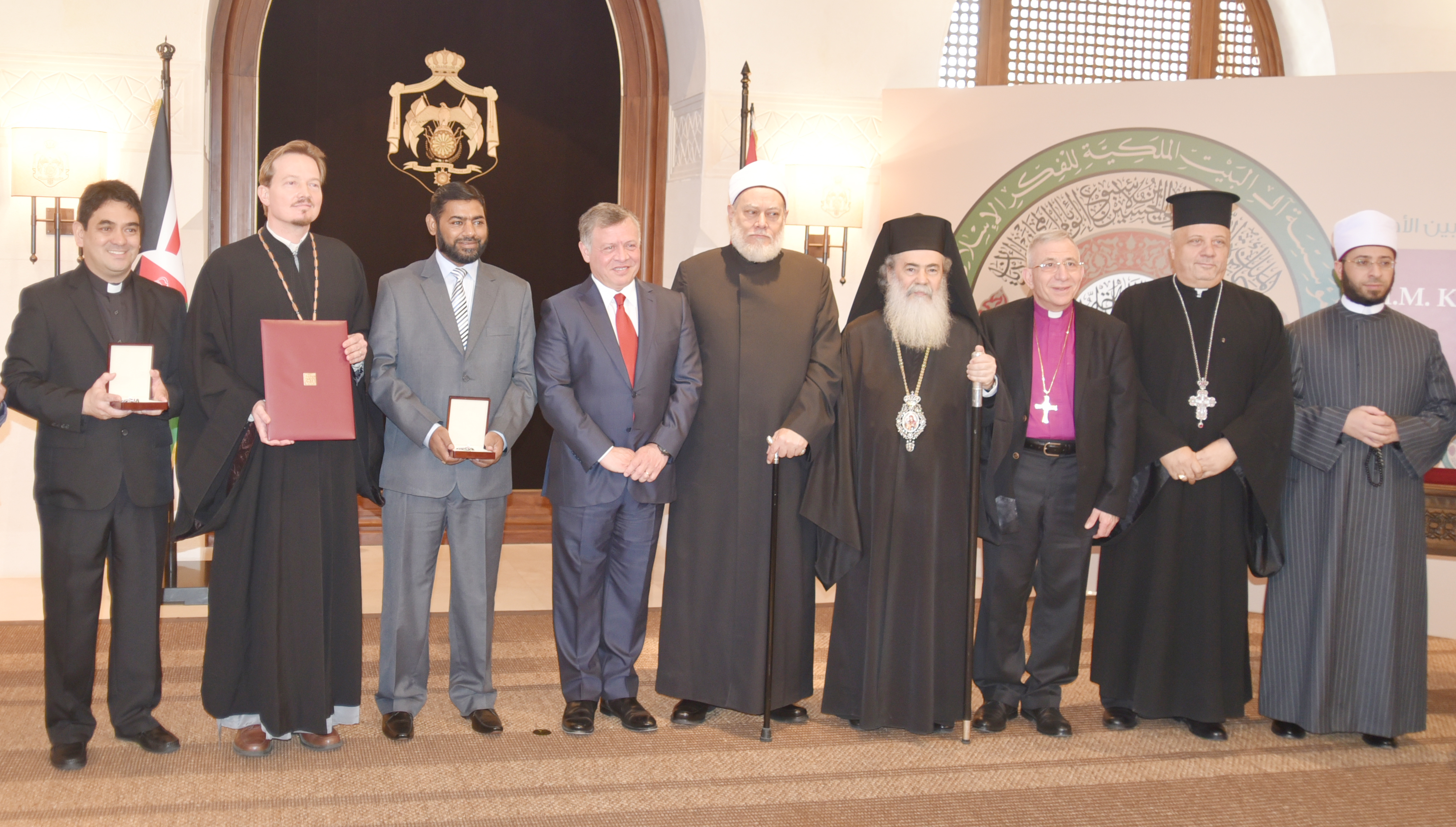
World Interfaith Harmony Week Award photo, Amman, Jordan, on April 17, 2016; Cleenewerck is second from left, King Abdullah II is fourth from left, Patriarch Theophilos III is fourth from right

== Musical contributions ==
Under the name Laurent de Kiev, he has released a number of classic French poems adapted to music under the title "De Verlaine a Rimbaud" (2023) and "de Musset à Sardou" (2021). Under the artistic name Francesco de Vivaldi, he was released albums of neo-classical baroque music on the theme of the Four Gospels and Twelve Apostles.

== Bibliography ==
=== Books ===
- Japan on the Edge: An inquiry into the Japanese Government's Struggle for Superpower Status and UN Security Council Membership at the Edge of Decline (co-authored with Roberto M Rodriguez), (EUC Press), 2009 - ISBN 9780578020532
- His Broken Body: Understanding and healing the schism between the Roman Catholic and Eastern Orthodox Churches (EUC Press), 2008 - ISBN 0615183611
- EOB: The Eastern Orthodox New Testament (Editor),
- "Binding and Non-Binding Instruments in Intergovernmental Relations: A diplomat's guide to understand the concepts of treaty and memorandum of understanding in theory and practice" (General Editor, Euclid University Press, 2015)
- Aiparthenos | Ever-Virgin? Understanding the Orthodox Catholic Doctrine of the Perpetual Virginity of Mary, the Mother of Jesus, and the Identity of James and the Brothers and Sisters of the Lord, (Euclid University Press), 2015 ISBN 9781507798379
- From Auctoritas to Potestas: The Development of Roman Primacy from the Pre-Nicene Era to Vatican I, (Independent), 2026 ISBN 979-8192324844

=== Academic Articles ===
- "Maximal care considerations when treating end-stage heart failure patients: Ethical and procedural quandaries in management of the very sick" (with Ernst Schwarz et al.), Journal of Religion and Health, 2010
- "The recovery of Eucharistic and Holographic Ecclesiology as a promising avenue of ecumenical dialogue and broader mutual recognition" (with Ernst Schwarz et al.), Journal of Ecumenical Studies, 2010
- Malaria Prevention Measures among Pregnant Women: A Population-Based Survey in Nnewi, Nigeria. Scientific World Journal (2019), with co-authors
- "The Effect of Spirituality and Religion on Outcomes in Patients with Chronic Heart Failure" (with Jesse J. Naghi, Kiran J. Philip, and Ernst Schwarz), Journal of Religion and Health, 2010
- "Philosophical implications of the systemic and patient-oriented management of chronic heart failure" (with Ernst Schwarz, Anita Phan, Russell Hobbs), Journal of Religion and Health, 2010
- "Financial cybercrime in the Islamic finance metaverse" with K Katterbauer, H Syed, L Cleenewerck - Journal of Metaverse, 2022
- "The impact of the legalization of Bitcoin in the Central African Republic: A legal analysis" with K Katterbauer, H Syed, L Cleenewerck - Cuadernos de Economía, 2022
- "Vaccine hesitancy in the post-COVID-19 Era: an interdisciplinary approach for a trust-and-risk paradigm with governmental and intergovernmental implications" L Cleenewerck de Kiev, DA Schieffler - 2022 - digitalcommons.sacredheart.edu
