= Euclid University =

Intergovernmental organization based in Africa

Coordinates: 13.4065°N 16.7271°W

EUCLID (Euclid University, Pôle Universitaire Euclide)
- Logo
- Headquarters: Gambia (2013-current) and Central African Republic (2011-current) and Belgium (temporary until 2011)
- Working languages: English; French
- Membership: 12 Participating States

Leaders
  - Secretary-General: (Trinidad and Tobago) Winston Dookeran
  - Deputy-Secretary-General: (Netherlands) Robin van Puyenbroeck
  - Oversight Council Chair: (United States) Laurent Cleenewerck
  - High Steward (Historic): (Central African Republic) President Faustin-Archange Touadéra
  - Founding Executive President (First Secretary-General): (Pakistan) Syed Zahid Ali

Establishment
  - Entry into force of Open Memorandum of Understanding I-49006: 2008; 18 years ago
- Website www.euclid.int

EUCLID, also called Pôle Universitaire Euclide or Euclid University, is an international intergovernmental organization with a university charter established in 2008. It has official headquarters in The Gambia and in the Central African Republic, but also maintains an executive office in Washington, D.C. Its primary mandate is to train officials for its participating states, but its programs are also offered to the general public. The institution's current secretary-general is Winston Dookeran.

== History ==
EUCLID's origins are connected with the creation of a group of universities called "Euclid Consortium" by the University of Bangui and the University of N'Djamena in 2006. The project was administered by the International Organization for Sustainable Development, an international non-governmental organization headed by Syed Zahid Ali. First conceived as an international extension for the University of Bangui, "Euclid" was redefined and constituted and a distinct institution in 2008 by an intergovernmental convention. The same year, the rector of the University of Bangui, Faustin-Archange Touadera was appointed as prime minister, and signed the convention formalizing his country's participation in EUCLID in 2010. In January 2008, Syed Zahid Ali, acting as Secretary-General of IOSD, presented to various government representative attending a conference of the Islamic Chamber of Commerce and Industry a new legal framework called EUCLID Phase 2. Soon after, several governments interested in using the Euclid programs to train their own staff approved the statutes of the new international university which entered into force in April 2008.

== Treaty information and legal status ==
=== United Nations treaty publication ===
According to the United Nations Treaty Series records, the EUCLID Open Memorandum of Understanding is classified as a "multilateral treaty" and entered into force in April 2008. The "Updated Framework Agreement" entered into force in September 2009. The agreements signed by the Gambia were registered by the Permanent Mission of the Gambia to the United Nations in 2013.

=== Participating states ===
Country	Joined	Signatory name	Signatory position	Comment
Saint Vincent and the Grenadines	2008	Girlyn Miguel	Minister of Education	With treaty registration
Sierra Leone, Republic of	2008	Zainab Bangura	Minister of Foreign Affairs	With treaty registration
Eritrea, State of	2008	Osman Saleh	Minister of Foreign Affairs	With treaty registration
Uganda, Republic of	2008	Sam Kutesa	Minister of Foreign Affairs	No treaty registration
Vanuatu, Republic of	2008	Bakoa Kaltongga	Minister of Foreign Affairs	No treaty registration
Senegal, Republic of	2009	Abdoulaye Faye	Minister to the President	With treaty registration
Benin, Republic of	2009	Paulin Djakpo	Director of Cabinet of the Minister of Foreign Affairs	No treaty registration
Comoros, Union of	2009	Mohamed Toihiri	Permanent Representative to United Nations	With treaty registration
Burundi, Republic of	2010	Augustin Nsanze	Minister of Foreign Affairs	With treaty registration
Central African Republic	2010	Faustin Touadera	Prime Minister	With treaty registration, only signed 49007
Timor-Leste, Democratic Republic of	2011	Joao Cancio Freitas	Minister of Education	With treaty registration
Gambia, Republic of the	2012	Mamadou Tangara	Minister of Education	With treaty registration
Djibouti, Republic of	2024	Mohamed Siad Doualeh	Permanent Representative to the United Nations in New York	Pending treaty registration

=== Headquarters ===
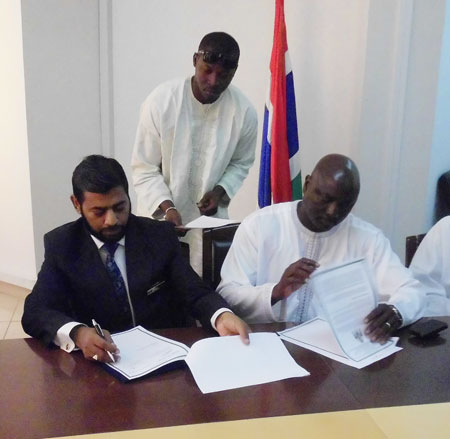
Euclid headquarters agreement signing

The initial 2008 agreement indicated that "The operational offices of EUCLID are allowed to remain in Brussels, Belgium and may be relocated or extended elsewhere upon recommendation of the Governing Board or by resolution of the Oversight Council" (Statutes II.3). In 2011, EUCLID signed a first headquarters agreement with the Central African Republic and obtained office space in the prime minister's building and on the campus of the University of Bangui. In 2013, owing to instability affecting Bangui and the Central African Republic, EUCLID signed a new headquarters agreement with the Republic of The Gambia, and leases offices in the Brusubi area of Banjul. Following the return of stability in the Central African Republic and the election of EUCLID's founding father and high steward Faustin-Archange Touadéra as president of the country in 2016, EUCLID signed an office sharing agreement with the National School of Administration and Magistracy (ENAM). As of 2026, EUCLID maintains both headquarters locations and is registered in the UNESCO IAU World Higher Education Database under Central African Republic rather than Gambia.

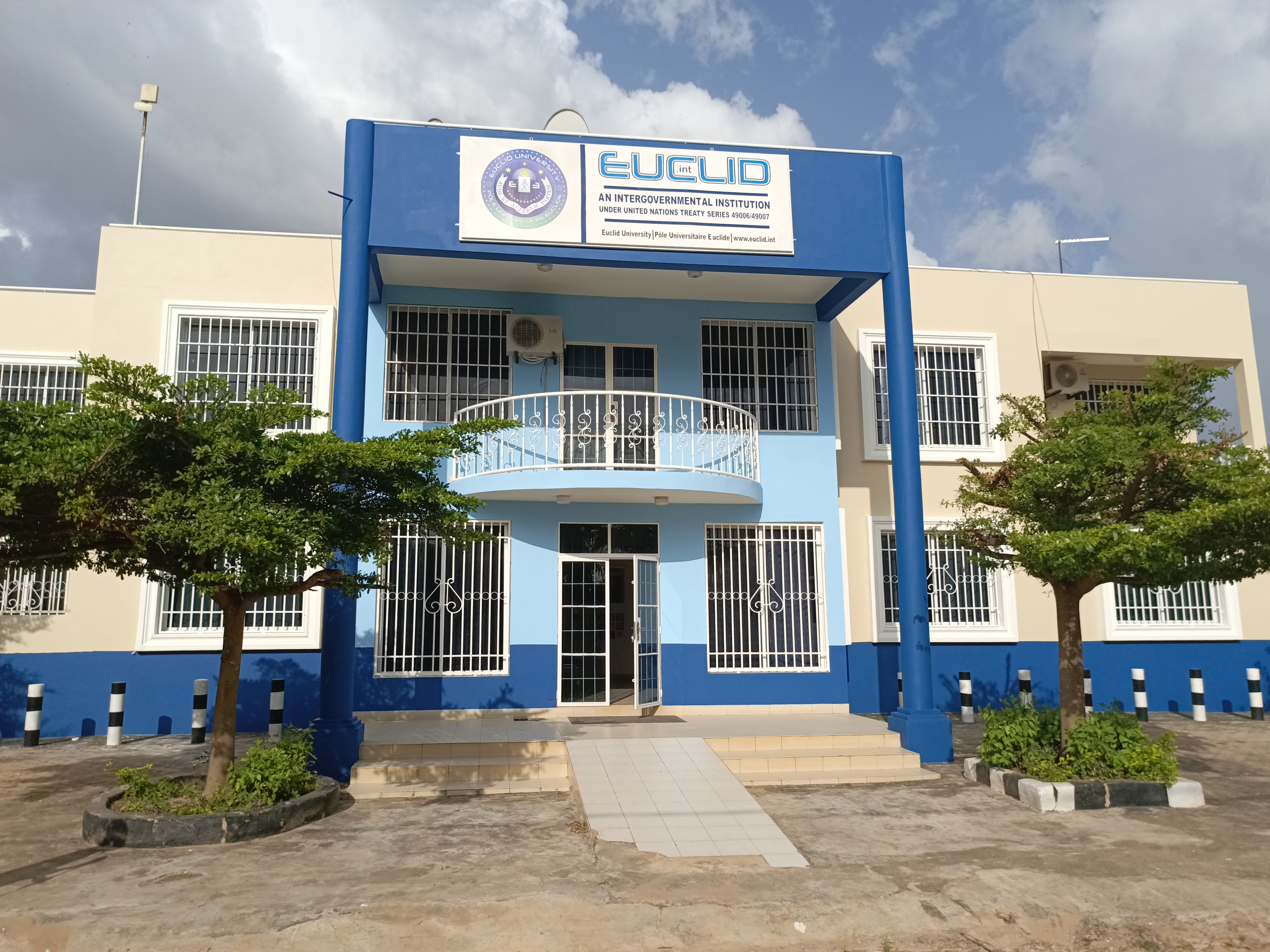
EUCLID Gambia Headquarters in 2023

=== Treaty-related domain and intellectual property rights ===
EUCLID flag as registered with WIPO

According to its constitutive text, EUCLID is defined as having an international legal personality, and it was granted a .int domain name under IANA regulations. As an "international intergovernmental organization", the institution also enjoys intellectual property protection under Article 6ter of the Paris Convention for the Protection of Industrial Property which is administered by the World Intellectual Property Organization.

== Schools and academic programs ==
EUCLID is organized in five academic units or schools:

School of Diplomacy and International Affairs

- School of Diplomacy, Mediation and Global Affairs
- H. Tristram Engelhardt School of Global Health and Bioethics
- School of Interfaith Studies and Religion
- School of Global Economics, Business and Sustainability
- School of Education, Language and Human Sciences

EUCLID offers graduate programs in:

- International Law and Treaty Law
- Mediation and Conflict Resolution
- Sustainable Development
- Islamic Banking and Finance
- Interreligious Dialogue
- Climate and Energy Studies
- International Public Health
- Bioethics
- International Organizations
- Energy Studies
- Comparative Christian Theology
- Diplomacy and International Affairs
- Eastern and Greek Orthodox Theology
- Global Economics and Development
- Interfaith Dialogue and Diplomacy
- Renewable Energy Studies
- Instructional Design and Open Learning
- Catholic Studies
- Sustainable Development and Diplomacy
- Terrorism Studies and De-Radicalization

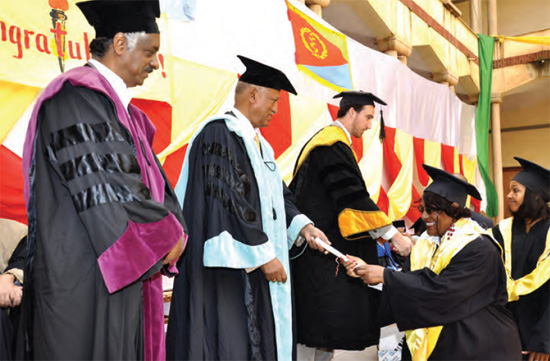
Eritrea LOT3 graduation ceremony 2012

=== Joint degree programs ===
EUCLID signed in 2015 a joint degree program agreement with CAFRAD, an intergovernmental organization dedicated to public administration in Africa, serving 36 member states. A similar joint degree program agreement was signed the COMESA Leather Product Institute. These agreements regulate the following programs:

- MBA in Islamic Finance
- MBA in Leather Commerce and Industry
- Master's in International Public Administration

=== Special programs ===
EUCLID was also involved in delivering distance-learning programs to civil servants in cooperation with the Ministry of Education of Eritrea between 2008 and 2012.

== Organizational structure ==
EUCLID's structure is spelled out in the statutes considered as an annex to the published treaties. Its administrative organs are:

- A governing board
- A board of advisors
- An executive board
- An oversight council.

=== Secretaries-general and high stewards ===
- Winston Dookeran (Secretary-General, 2020–present) (former Minister of Foreign Affairs of Trinidad and Tobago)
- Syed Zahid Ali (Secretary-General, 2008–2020)
- Juan Avila, (Ambassador, Permanent Mission of the Dominican Republic to the United Nations), High Steward since 2015
- Faustin-Archange Touadéra (President of the Central African Republic), High Steward since 2014

=== Former high stewards ===
- Banny deBrum, (High Steward, 2009–2011) Ambassador of the Republic of the Marshall Islands to the United States (2008-2011)
- Mohamed Toihiri, (High Steward, 2011–2012) Ambassador of the Union of the Comoros to the United States (2011-current)
- Hermenegilde Niyonzima, (Institutional High Steward, 2012–present) Ambassador of the Republic of Burundi to the United Nations (2012-2014)
- Roubani Kaambi, (Diplomatic High Steward, 2012–2014) Ambassador of the Union of the Comoros to the United States and United Nations (2012-current)

=== Affiliated institutes ===
The EUCLID statutes mentions several "affiliated institutes":

- International Organization for Sustainable Development (IOSD)
- EUROSTATE University Institute, now Euler-Franeker Memorial University Institute
- International Institute for Inter-Religious Dialogue and Diplomacy
- Center for Ecological Desertification and Reforestation.

== Cooperation with other intergovernmental bodies ==
EUCLID has signed agreements with or is a member of:

- Association of Caribbean States
- Islamic Chamber of Commerce, Industry and Agriculture (ICCIA), an affiliated institution of the Organisation of Islamic Cooperation
- Economic Community of West African States
- African Training and Research Centre in Administration for Development (CAFRAD)
- Islamic Development Bank (IsDB)
- Africa Leather and Leather Products Institute (ALLPI)
- International Anti-Corruption Academy (IACA)

EUCLID is an approved as an intergovernmental observer in the UNFCCC Climate Conference and Intergovernmental Panel on Climate Change (IPCC).

== Institutional memberships ==
- Academic Council on the United Nations Systems
- Association of African Universities
- Association of Universities of Asia and the Pacific (AUAP)
- International Anti-Corruption Academy (IACA)
- United Nations Academic Impact
- GUNI (Global University Network for Innovation)
- United Nations Global Compact
- PRME – United Nations Principles for Responsible Management Education
- GRLI – Globally Responsible Leadership Initiative

In his personal capacity, the EUCLID secretary general is a member of the International Association of University Presidents.

== UN Interfaith Harmony Week prize ==
In 2016, EUCLID coordinated a series of events for the United Nations World Interfaith Harmony Week and was awarded first prize by the jury, with a gold medal to be presented to the EUCLID delegation in April 2016 by King Abdullah II of Jordan.

== Accreditation and recognition ==
=== Central African Republic as headquarters state ===
EUCLID signed its initial headquarters agreement with the Central African Republic in 2011 which was updated with an additional protocol in 2018. The Permanent Delegation to UNESCO posted in 2016 its filing which includes EUCLID as "recognized / accredited". EUCLID is accredited by the Ministry of Higher Education of Central African Republic as its historic headquarters state.

=== Gambia as headquarters state ===
The National UNESCO Commission of Gambia posted in 2014 its "UNESCO Portal to Recognized Higher Education Institutions" documents which now include EUCLID (Euclid University) as "recognized / accredited". EUCLID holds full institutional accreditation from the country's National Accreditation and Quality Assurance Authority (NAQAA) (renewed 2026 for 4 years).

=== UN statement ===
The Permanent Mission of the Central African Republic to the United Nations wrote to the UN Secretariat in October 2012 to complain that the world's five international universities were not included in the UN Inspira database. In December 2012, the United Nations replied that "both IAU/UNESCO and the UN Secretariat recognize Euclide- Pole Universitaire Euclide and the other four UN institutions ... as being accredited" in spite of not being included in Inspira. The UN also indicated that these institutions which are "regional or global in nature" would be included under their headquarters states in future editions of the IAU WHED database used by the United Nations. The transfer was completed in September 2017.

=== United States ===
EUCLID is not a US-based university and it not accredited by an organization recognized by the U.S. Department of Education or Council on Higher Education Accreditation; but it maintains an address in Washington, DC "exclusively used for appointments and meetings either with or by government-sponsored and government affiliated staff". The letters sent in 2012 by the governments of Burundi, Central African Republic and Comoros to the US Department of State describe the institution as being "duly chartered to confer degrees by its Participating States and enjoys full academic accreditation according to its constitutive mandate under international law (Article I)." For US evaluation purposes, EUCLID degrees are evaluated by NACES agencies as accredited on the basis of the institution's NAQAA (Gambia) accreditation.

== Notable alumni ==
- Diego Gómez Pickering, author and former Mexican Ambassador to the United Kingdom
- Hanna Simon, Ambassador of Eritrea to France and UNESCO
- Charles-Armel Doubane, former Minister of Foreign Affairs of the Central African Republic
- Yetimgeta Asrat, State Minister, Ministry of Urban and Infrastructure, Ethiopia
