= List of universities in Guatemala =

This is a list of universities in Guatemala.

== Public institution ==
- Universidad de San Carlos de Guatemala (USAC), founded in 1676

== Private institutions ==
- Universidad Rafael Landívar, founded in 1961
- Universidad del Valle de Guatemala, founded in 1966
- Universidad Mariano Gálvez de Guatemala, founded in 1966
- Universidad Francisco Marroquín, founded in 1971
- Universidad Rural de Guatemala, founded in 1995
- Universidad del Istmo, founded in 1997
- Universidad Panamericana, founded in 1998
- Universidad Mesoamericana, founded in 1999
- Universidad Galileo, founded in 2000
- Universidad San Pablo de Guatemala, founded in 2006
- Universidad InterNaciones, founded in 2009
- Universidad de Occidente, founded in 2010
- Universidad Da Vinci de Guatemala, founded in 2012
- Universidad Regional de Guatemala, founded in 2014

== Other institutions ==
- Academia de Artes Culinarias de Guatemala
- Instituto Femenino de Estudios Superiores IFES
- INTECAP - Instituto de Capacitacion
- Loyola Escuela Empresarial para las Américas
- National Conservatory of Music Germán Alcántara
