= International Institute for Inter-Religious Dialogue and Diplomacy =

Institution in The Gambia

The International Institute for Inter-Religious Dialogue and Diplomacy is an affiliated institution of EUCLID (Euclid University). Its main focus is education in the application of diplomatic methods to interreligious dialogue, notably between Christianity and Islam.
