= Romain Teyssier =

French computational astrophysicist

Romain Teyssier is a French computational astrophysicist known for his work on cosmology, galaxy formation, star formation, and numerical fluid dynamics. He is Professor of Astrophysical Sciences and Applied and Computational Mathematics at Princeton University.

Teyssier is the principal author of RAMSES, an Adaptive Mesh Refinement (AMR) code for modeling self-gravitating, magnetized, and radiative astrophysical flows.

He received the 2011 Grand Prix Scientifique of the Simone and Cino Del Duca Foundation of the French Academy of Sciences.

== Education and career ==
Teyssier studied at École Polytechnique before completing a master’s degree and PhD in astrophysics at Paris Cité University.

After completing his PhD, he held a postdoctoral position at Lawrence Livermore National Laboratory from 1997 to 1998, working with Bruce Remington. He then joined CEA Saclay as a junior researcher in 1998, later becoming a senior researcher in 2006, a position he held until 2013. During this period, he led and contributed to computational astrophysics projects, including the Horizon and COAST initiatives.

In 2013, Teyssier was appointed associate professor in Computational Astrophysics at the University of Zürich, where he later became full professor and served as director of the Institute for Computational Science. In 2021, he joined Princeton University as Professor of Astrophysical Sciences and Applied and Computational Mathematics, where he research on galaxy formation, star formation, and large-scale cosmological simulations.

== Research ==
Teyssier conducts research in numerical cosmology, baryonic physics in galaxy formation, star-formation processes, and plasma and magnetohydrodynamics. He has played roles in international simulation programmes, including the Horizon and COAST projects, and co-leads the Cosmological Simulation Working Group of the Euclid Consortium, contributing to weak-lensing and galaxy-clustering modelling. His recent work also supports simulations for observations with the James Webb Space Telescope and cosmological science with the Nancy Grace Roman Space Telescope.

Teyssier is the lead developer of the RAMSES adaptive-mesh-refinement code, widely used to model self-gravitating, magnetised and radiative flows. Using large-scale numerical simulations, he studies galaxy and star formation across a wide range of spatial scales, from individual stellar systems to the large-scale structure of the Universe, and has advanced understanding of how gas dynamics and feedback from supermassive black holes shape galaxy morphology and evolution.

At the University of Zurich, he led a team that produced virtual universes, modelling around 25 billion galaxies with two trillion particles to generate a reference galaxy catalogue for the Euclid mission of the European Space Agency.

== Selected publications ==
- Teyssier, R. (2002-04-01). "Cosmological hydrodynamics with adaptive mesh refinement - A new high resolution code called RAMSES". Astronomy & Astrophysics. 385 (1): 337–364. arXiv:astro-ph/0111367. Bibcode:2002A&A...385..337T. doi:10.1051/0004-6361:20011817. ISSN 0004-6361.
- Teyssier, R.; Birnboim, Y.; Engel, G.; Freundlich, J.; Goerdt, T.; Mumcuoglu, M.; Neistein, E.; Pichon, C.; Dekel, A.; Zinger, E. (2009). "Cold streams in early massive hot haloes as the main mode of galaxy formation". Nature. 457 (7228): 451–454. arXiv:0808.0553. Bibcode:2009Natur.457..451D. doi:10.1038/nature07648. ISSN 1476-4687. PMID 19158792.
- Teyssier, Romain; Moore, Ben; Stadel, Joachim; Potter, Doug; Miniati, Francesco; Read, Justin; Mayer, Lucio; Gawryszczak, Artur; Kravtsov, Andrey; Nordlund, Åke; Pearce, Frazer; Quilis, Vicent; Rudd, Douglas; Springel, Volker; Stone, James (2007-08-23). "Fundamental differences between SPH and grid methods: Simulating fluids using SPH and grid techniques". Monthly Notices of the Royal Astronomical Society. 380 (3): 963–978. arXiv:astro-ph/0610051. doi:10.1111/j.1365-2966.2007.12183.x.
- Dubois, Y.; Teyssier, R. (2008-01-01). "On the onset of galactic winds in quiescent star forming galaxies". Astronomy & Astrophysics. 477 (1): 79–94. arXiv:0707.3376. Bibcode:2008A&A...477...79D. doi:10.1051/0004-6361:20078326. ISSN 0004-6361.
- Rasera, Y.; Teyssier, R. (2006-01-01). "The history of the baryon budget - Cosmic logistics in a hierarchical universe". Astronomy & Astrophysics. 445 (1): 1–27. arXiv:astro-ph/0505473. Bibcode:2006A&A...445....1R. doi:10.1051/0004-6361:20053116. ISSN 0004-6361.
- Ocvirk, P.; Pichon, C.; Teyssier, R. (2008). "Bimodal gas accretion in the Horizon-MareNostrum galaxy formation simulation". Monthly Notices of the Royal Astronomical Society. 390 (4): 1326. arXiv:0803.4506. Bibcode:2008MNRAS.390.1326O. doi:10.1111/j.1365-2966.2008.13763.x.
