= Durham College (disambiguation) =

Durham College is an applied arts and technology college in Ontario, Canada.

Durham College may also refer to:

- New College, Durham (17th century), a short-lived foundation of Oliver Cromwell
- Durham College (North Carolina), a closed university in Durham, North Carolina
- Durham College, Oxford, a medieval foundation whose buildings were used to found Trinity College, Oxford
- Colleges of Durham University, Durham, England
