= Tori Murden =

American athlete, adventurer, chaplain, lawyer, and university president

Victoria Murden McClure
- Born: Victoria Murden; March 6, 1963 (age 63); Brooksville, Florida, U.S.
- Education: Smith College (BA)Harvard Divinity School (MDiv)University of Louisville School of Law (JD)Spalding University (MFA)
- Occupations: Athlete, adventurer, chaplain, lawyer, university administrator

Victoria Murden McClure (born March 6, 1963) is an athlete, adventurer, chaplain, lawyer, and university administrator. In 1999, she became the first woman and first American to row solo across the Atlantic Ocean. She was also the first woman and first American to ski to the geographic South Pole and the first woman to climb the Lewis Nunatak in the Antarctic.

== Early life and education ==
Murden McClure was born on March 6, 1963 in Brooksville, Florida and as a child moved to Connecticut and then to Pennsylvania. At the age of fifteen, she moved in with her grandmother in Louisville, Kentucky, to attend the Louisville Collegiate School from which she graduated in 1981. She went on to Smith College, earning a bachelor's degree in psychology in 1985. She followed that with a Master of Divinity from Harvard Divinity School in 1989, a J.D. from the University of Louisville School of Law in 1995, and a Master of Fine Arts in writing from Spalding University.

== Solo row across the Atlantic ==
Thirty-six years old at the time, Murden McClure rowed for 81 days, traveling 4,767 kilometres (2,962 mi), starting from the Canary Islands and finishing at Guadeloupe on December 3, 1999. Her boat, Pearl, was twenty-three feet long, four feet high, and six feet wide and weighed about 1800 pounds. It was her second trip across the ocean, her first one cut short due to the hurricane season in 1998.

Her memoir about the experiences, A Pearl in the Storm: How I Found My Heart in the Middle of the Ocean, was published by HarperCollins in 2009.

== Antarctic ==
Murden McClure is also noted for her 700-mile ski across the South Pole (the first woman to ski to the South Pole), and she was the first woman to climb the Lewis Nunatak in the Antarctic.

== Other activities ==
Murden McClure worked as a chaplain at Boston City Hospital, the executive director of a shelter for homeless women, and a public policy analyst for the Mayor of Louisville, and she worked for the boxer and humanitarian Muhammad Ali.

On June 1, 2010, she became the president of Spalding University, a private Catholic university in Louisville, Kentucky. She retired in 2024.

She served as the chair of the board of the National Outdoor Leadership School, an outdoor education school headquartered in Lander, Wyoming that focuses on environmental ethics and wilderness excursions

== Honors and awards ==
- 1988 – First woman and first American to reach the summit of the Lewis Nunatak in the Antarctic
- 1989 – First woman and first American to ski to the geographic South Pole
- 1989 – Named a Hopkins Scholar at Harvard University
- 1999 – First woman and first American to row across the Atlantic
- 1999 – Received Kentucky Derby Festival's Silver Horse Shoe Award for courage, determination, and community service
- 2000 – Received special Victor Award, given annually by the National Academy of Sports Editors to outstanding athletes
- 2000 – Received the Peter Bird Trophy for Tenacity and Perseverance from the Ocean Rowing Society International
- 2000 – Honored^{In what way?} by European Academy of Sport
