= History of education in Chad =

The establishment of Protestant mission schools in southern Chad in the 1920s, followed by Roman Catholic and colonial state establishments in later decades, marked the beginning of Western education in Chad.

== Colonial era ==
From the outset, the colonial administration required that all instruction be in French, with the exception of religion classes, which could be taught in local languages. As early as 1925, the state imposed a standard curriculum on all institutions wishing official recognition and government subsidies. The state extended its influence to education, even though the majority of Chadian students attended private mission schools before World War II.

Education in Chad has focused on primary instruction. Until 1942, students who desired a secular secondary education had to go to schools in Brazzaville, the capital of the AEF. This restriction limited the number of secondary-school students. Between World War I and World War II, only a dozen Chadians studied in Brazzaville. Once in Brazzaville, students received technical instruction rather than a liberal arts education, entering three-year programmes designed to produce medical aides, clerks, or low-level technicians. State secondary schools were opened in Chad in 1942, but recognized certificate programs did not begin until the mid-1950s.

== Independence ==
At independence in 1960, the government established a goal of universal primary education, and school attendance was made compulsory until age twelve. Nevertheless, the development of standard curricula was hampered by the limited number of schools, the existence of two- and three-year establishments alongside the standard five and seven-year colleges and lycées, and the Muslim preference for Quranic education. Even so, by the mid-1960s 17 percent of students between the ages of six and eight were in school. This number represented a substantial increase over the 8 percent attending school in the mid-1950s and the 1.4 percent immediately after World War II. Although the academic year in Chad parallels the French schedule, running from October to June, it is not particularly appropriate for a country where the hottest part of the April and May.

Quranic schools throughout the Saharan and Sahelian zones teach students to read Arabic and recite Quranic verse. Although traditional Islamic education at the secondary level has existed since the nineteenth century, students seeking advanced learning generally have studied in northern Cameroon, Nigeria, Sudan, or the Middle East. In Chad, modern Islamic secondary schools have included the Ecole Mohamed Illech, founded in 1918 and modelled after Egyptian educational institutions. Other schools included the Lycée Franco-Arabe, founded by the colonial administration in Abéché in 1952. The lycée offered a blend of Arabic, Quranic, and secular French education. Numerous observers believed that although the creation of a French-Islamic program of study was commendable, the administration's major objective was to counter foreign Islamic influence rather than to offer a viable alternative curriculum.

Despite the government's efforts, overall educational levels remained low at the end of the first decade of independence. In 1971 about 88 percent of men and 99 percent of women older than age fifteen could not read, write, or speak French, at the time the only official national language; literacy in Arabic stood at 7.8 percent. In 1982 the overall literacy rate stood at about 15 percent.

Major problems have hindered the development of Chadian education since independence. Financing has been very limited. Public expenditures for education amounted to only 14 percent of the national budget in 1963. Expenditures increased over the next several years but declined at the end of the decade. In 1969 funding for education dropped to 11 percent of the budget; the next year it declined still further to 9 percent. In the late 1980s, the government allotted only about 7 percent of its budget to education, a figure lower than that for all but a few African countries.

Limited facilities and personnel also have made it difficult for the education system to provide adequate instruction. Overcrowding is a major problem; some classes have up 100 students, many of whom are repeaters. In the years just after independence, many primary-school teachers had only marginal qualifications. On the secondary level, the situation was even worse; at the end of the 1960s, for example, the Lycée Ahmad Mangué in Sarh (formerly Fort-Archambault) had only a handful of Chadians among its several dozen faculty members. During these years, Chad lacked sufficient facilities for technical and vocational education to train needed intermediate-level technicians, and there was no university.

In the 1970s and 1980s, Chad made considerable progress in dealing with problems of facilities and personnel. To improve instruction, review sessions and refresher programs have been instituted for primary-school teachers. On the secondary level, increasing numbers of Chadians have taken their places in the ranks of the faculty. Furthermore, during the 1971–72 school year, the Université du Tchad opened its doors.

Another problem at independence was that the French curricula of Chadian schools limited their effectiveness. Primary instruction was in French, although most students did not speak that language when they entered school, and teaching methods and materials were often poorly suited to the rural settings of most schools. In addition, the academic program inherited from the French did not prepare students for employment options in Chad. Beginning in the late 1960s, the government attempted to address these problems. A number of model schools discarded the French-style of a formal, classical education in favor of a new approach that taught children to reinterpret and modify their social and economic environment. Rather than teaching French as it was taught in French schools to French children, the model schools taught it more appropriately as a foreign language. These new schools also introduced basic skills courses in the fourth year of primary school. Students who would probably not go on to secondary school were given the chance to attend agricultural training centers.

All of the preceding problems were complicated by a fourth difficulty: the Chadian Civil War. Little has been written specifically about how this conflict has disrupted education, but several effects can reasonably be surmised. Lack of security in vast parts of the country undoubtedly has made it difficult to send teachers to their posts and to maintain them there, which has been particularly problematic because as government employees, teachers often have been identified with government policies. In addition, the mobility occasioned by the war has played havoc with attempts to get children to attend classes regularly. The diversion of resources to the conflict has also prevented the government from maintaining the expenditure levels found at independence, much less augmenting available funds. Finally, the violence has taken its toll among teachers, students, and facilities. One of the more dramatic instances of this was the destruction and looting of primary schools, lycées, and even the national archives attached to the Université du Tchad during the battles of N'Djamena in 1979 and 1980.

The government has made major efforts to overcome these problems. In 1983 the Ministry of Planning and Reconstruction reported that the opening of the 1982–83 school year was the most successful since the upheavals of 1979. In 1984 the Université du Tchad, the Ecole Nationale d'Administration, and the Ecole Nationale des Travaux Publics reopened their doors as well.

== Ministry of Education ==
In the late 1980s, the Ministry of Education had administrative responsibility for all formal schooling. Because of years of civil strife, however, local communities had assumed many of the ministry's functions, including the construction and maintenance of schools, and payment of teachers' salaries.
