= Hanna Simon =

Eritrean politician

Hanna Simon is an Eritrean diplomat. She has represented Eritrea in foreign affairs, including two periods as ambassador of Eritrea to France.

== Early life ==
Hanna Simon was born in Addis Ababa as one of eleven children in an Eritrean family. Her family spoke the Tigrinya language rather than Amharic. She was educated at French schools in Addis Ababa and learnt to speak French. Two of her brothers died during the Eritrean War of Independence. Her sister is the journalist Ruth Simon. Simon married a fellow member of the Eritrean People's Liberation Front but later divorced him.

== Career ==
In 1999, the government of Eritrea announced that Hanna Simon was being named ambassador to France. She served in this capacity until 2006 when she was recalled to Asmara, with diplomat Ahmed Dehli stepping into place as chargé d'affaires.

From 2008 to 2011, Simon completed a master's degree at Euclid University in Diplomacy and International Affairs, subsequently being invited to teach the course "Diplomatic Protocol and Immunities." She also served as Eritrea's Director General of the Department of Eritreans Residing Abroad.

In 2014, Simon was once again named ambassador to France. In that year, she was also named Eritrea's Permanent Representative to UNESCO. She commemorated Asmara's designation as a World Heritage Site in 2017.

She has supported greater participation of Eritrea in international organizations and has criticized foreign sanctions on Eritrea.

In 2019, Simon once again stepped down from her position as ambassador, this time under disputed circumstances. Reporting by Africa Intelligence suggested that she was preparing to leave Paris in order to become mayor of Asmara. However, Awate reported that Simon was reluctant to return, and had been removed from her post after writing a critical report to Osman Saleh, the minister of foreign affairs.
