= Euclid Consortium =

The Euclid Consortium is a distance learning educational consortium created in 2005 by the University of Bangui (Central African Republic), the Université Libre Internationale (Belgium), and the International Organization for Sustainable Development. The original name was Euclid University Consortium, but the structure was renamed in December 2008 in order to avoid confusion with EUCLID University, which is a member of the consortium.

== History, membership and programs ==
The Euclid initiative began in June 2004 as a cooperative project between the Human Bioethics Treaty Organization and the Embassy of the Central African Republic in Washington, DC. This formalized an educational extension project with the University of Bangui and the private Université Libre Internationale of Brussels (Belgium) as co-founders. In January 2006, the agreements were revised and transferred with the formation of IOSD (the International Organization for Sustainable Development) and the participation of the Université Libre du Burkina alongside ULI.

The University of N'Djamena (UNDT, Chad), became a full member of the consortium in May 2006, adding the institutional recognition of its IAU (International Association of Universities) member status and the approval of its Ministry of Education to the initiative. In 2007, the Gaston Berger University of Senegal announced its intention to participate in the consortium and confirmed the decision in 2008.

The Consortium organizes online degree programs on behalf of the member schools and manages other joint academic initiatives of interest to the participating universities. The programs are offered in French and English, notably in Diplomacy, Sustainable Development and Religious Studies, which are structured after the Bologna Process, including ECTS and Diploma Supplement, in order to follow both European Union and United States guidelines.

== Structure and organization ==
The consortium's educational programs are managed by 4 academic units called schools:

- The John Jay School of Diplomacy and International Affairs
- The Blaise Pascal School of Computing and Sciences
- The John Locke School of Business and Economics
- The Pavel Florensky School of Theology and Ministry
- The Euclid School of Education Development

Since 2009, the programs are directly managed by EUCLID (University), and the original academic units were absorbed in EUCLID. EUCLID University is a recognised degree-granting institution listed by UNESCO under ID IAU-024734 and accredited by the Ministry of Higher Education of the Central African Republic and by the relevant ministries of Euclid participating states (Saint Vincent and the Grenadines, Sierra Leone, Eritrea, Senegal, Comoros, Burundi, Timor-Leste and the Gambia as documented in United Nations Treaty Series I-49006 and 49007).

The Euclid Consortium is headed by a high steward, the ambassador of the Central African Republic to the United States, His Excellency Emmanuel Touaboye and an executive president, Mr. Syed Zahid Ali, who is also the secretary-general of EUCLID (Euclid University).

Academic oversight is under the responsibility of the oversight council, whose co-chairmen are the rectors of the participating universities.

== Member universities ==
- EUCLID (University), primary institution since 2008
- University of N'Djamena, joint degree-granting institution in some cases
- University of Bangui, joint degree-granting institution in some cases
- ULI (Brussels) +
- Université Libre du Burkina +
- Université Gaston Berger +
- Université des Comores +

+ Consortium members but not joint degree granters

== Accreditation process and institutional evolution ==
This inter-university initiative was originally named "Pôle d'Extension Universitaire Euclide" and the name "Euclid University" was initially used as a short translation of the French name, giving the unintentional impression that the extension consortium was intended to be a free-standing, degree-granting institution. This led to technical and legal issues in the English-speaking world. In order to correct this situation, the official English name was amended to "Euclid University Consortium" to emphasize the fact that Euclid was originally designed as a consortium, not a free-standing university with its own charter and degrees. In January 2009, the name was further changed to "Euclid Consortium."

Because the international directory of UNESCO does not list inter-institutional consortia, the registration of the extension initiative was done under the entry for the universities of N'Djamena and Bangui. Hence, the Consortium's recognition is tied to the recognition of the member universities, two of which are the actual degree granters, since the consortium itself has no direct degree-granting authority.

In December 2006, IOSD signed an agreement with the Islamic Chamber of Commerce and Industry, an affiliated institution of the 57 member-state Organisation of the Islamic Conference, establishing the recognition of its programs and applicable accreditations.

In 2008, the need for the consortium to obtain an autonomous charter and direct governmental accreditation led to the introduction of a multilateral Memorandum of Understanding which was approved by the four initial participating states. This intergovernmental agreement formalized the constitution of EUCLID (University) as an intergovernmental university framework with legal personality, indicating that EUCLID would also become a member of the Euclid Consortium.
