= Loyola Escuela Empresarial para las Américas =

Loyola Escuela Empresarial para las Américas is a university in Guatemala.
