= Universidad Rural =

Universidad Rural de Guatemala
- Type: Private
- Endowment: 1988 y 1995
- President: Dr. Fidel Reyes Lee
- Location: Guatemala City, Guatemala
- Campus: 7ª calle 6-49, zona 2
- Website: urural.edu.gt

Universidad Rural is a private, secular university in Guatemala.

== See also ==
- List of universities in Guatemala
