= Globally Responsible Leadership Initiative =

- Abbreviation: GRLI
- Formation: 2004
- Headquarters: Brussels, Belgium
- Region served: Global
- Website: www.grli.org

The Globally Responsible Leadership Initiative (GRLI) is a non-profit community of businesses as well as business schools and other educational institutions. Based in Belgium, Brussels, its purpose is to catalyse the development of globally responsible leadership and practice in organisations and society worldwide. The GRLI was founded in 2004 and counts numerous organisations that are its partners and members. GRLI is an official partner of United Nations Sustainable Development Goals for Quality Education and Responsible Consumption and Production.

GRLI's strategic partners are the Association to Advance Collegiate Schools of Business (AACSB), the European Foundation for Management Development (EFMD) and the United Nations Global Compact.

== Mission and role ==
The mission of GRLI "to catalyze the development of globally responsible leadership and practice worldwide" is in line with the view promoted by GRLI that:

"The management challenge for the 21st Century is to create resilient societies, sustainable economies and a healthy environment in which all human beings can flourish and prosper. This calls for individual and collective leadership that strives not to be the best in the world but the best for the world."

The GRLI aims at building a world where leaders contribute to the creation of economic and societal progress in a globally responsible and sustainable way. A starting point for global leadership includes, according to GRLI, fairness, freedom, honesty, humanity, tolerance, transparency, responsibility and solidarity, and sustainability. Considered a resource for business education for cultivating leadership integrity, the GRLI challenges business schools and other learning institutions to explain and promote organizational cultural changes toward social responsibility. It also cooperates with institutions of higher education to further develop their curricula.

The initiative has catalysed the creation of two new academic journals: the Journal of Global Responsibility and the Sustainability, Accounting, Management and Policy Journal.

The GRLI, in partnership with Principles for Responsible Management Education (PRME) and other networks, has given rise to several projects including:

- the Sulitest – an online sustainability literacy test developed and promoted by KEDGE Business School in France,
- the AIM2Flourish global learning initiative – a global initiative steering future business leaders towards achieving the UN Sustainable Development Goals, with an online platform for sharing positive stories on business as an agent for world benefit, championed by the Weatherhead School of Management at Case Western Reserve University in Ohio, USA;
- the 50+20 Agenda – a vision and global movement focused on "transforming management education in order to serve people, the planet and profit".

== History ==
The GRLI was founded in 2004 by the European Foundation for Management Development and the United Nations Global Compact. The initiative's 2005 founding report identified a need for deep systemic change in business, recognizing that this change "needed to take place at the personal, organizational and systemic levels". It was founded with the purpose of developing a next generation of globally responsible leaders through the development and support of projects and initiatives.

== See also ==
- Global citizenship
