= Academia de Artes Culinarias de Guatemala =

Culinary Academy

Coordinates: 14°35′35.8″N 90°30′31.2″W

Academia de Artes Culinarias de Guatemala is a culinary training academy in Guatemala. Many of the top chefs in Guatemala, Honduras, El Salvador, and southern Mexico have trained at the academy.

The Culinary Academy of Guatemala, in addition to offering programs for training chefs, offers free courses on world cuisines.
