= World Interfaith Harmony Week =

International observance, first week of February

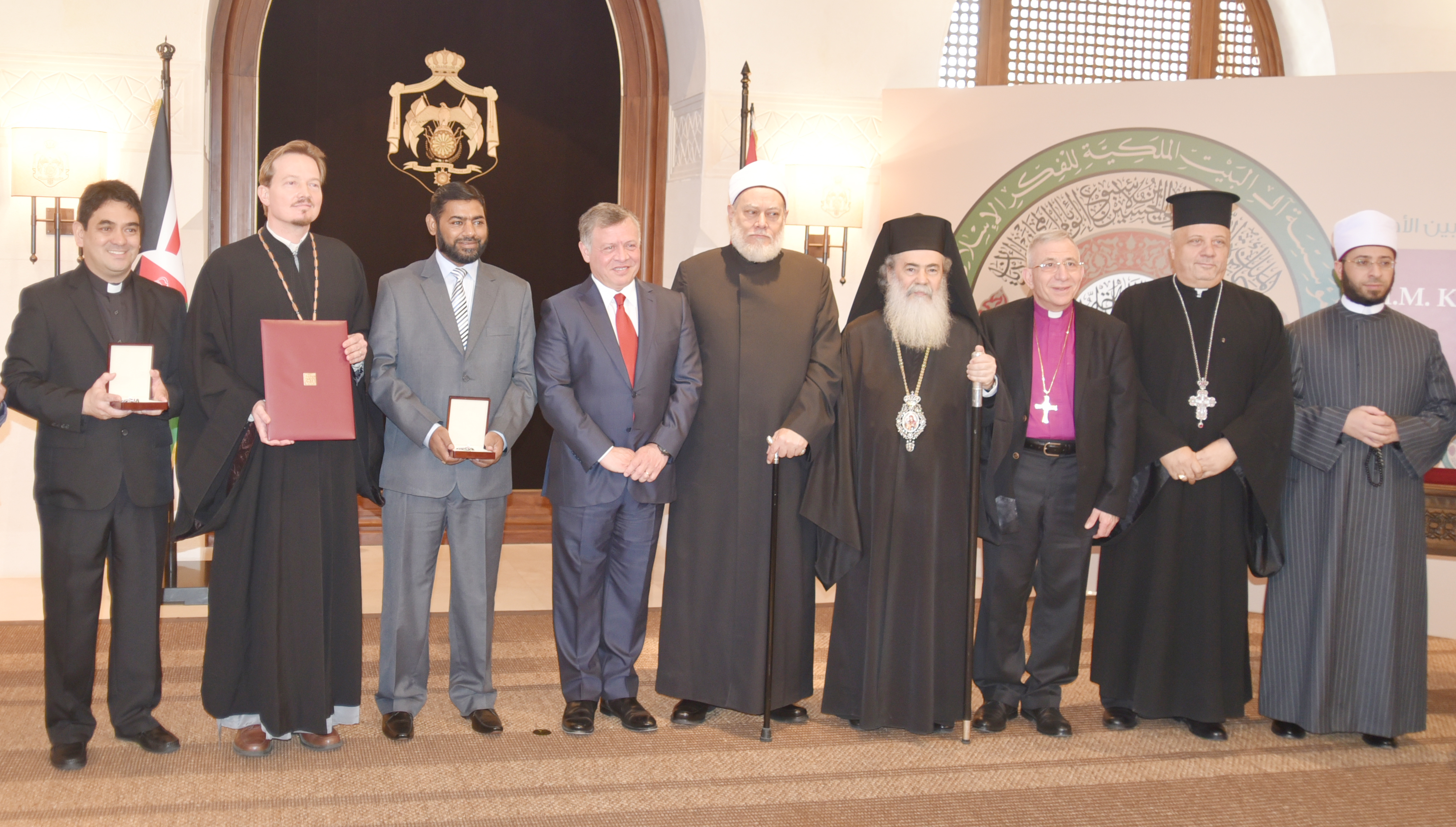
World Interfaith Harmony Week Award in Amman, Jordan, on April 17, 2016

World Interfaith Harmony Week is a UN resolution for a worldwide week of interfaith harmony proposed in 2010 by King Abdullah II and Prince Ghazi bin Muhammad of Jordan. The World Interfaith Harmony Week falls in the first week of February of every year and aims to promote harmony between all people regardless of their faith.

== Introduction ==
On September 23, 2010, King Abdullah II of Jordan proposed a World Interfaith Harmony Week at the Plenary Session of the 65th United Nations General Assembly in New York City. In the speech King Abdullah said:

It is [also] essential to resist forces of division that spread misunderstanding and mistrust especially among peoples of different religions. The fact is, humanity everywhere is bound together, not only by mutual interests, but by shared commandments to love God and neighbour; to love the good and neighbour. This week, my delegation, with the support of our friends on every continent, will introduce a draft resolution for an annual World Interfaith Harmony Week. What we are proposing is a special week, during which the world's people, in their own places of worship, could express the teachings of their own faith about tolerance, respect for the other and peace. I hope this resolution will have your support.

On October 20, 2010, Prince Ghazi bin Muhammad of Jordan, Special Advisor and Personal Envoy to the King Abdullah II and author of the resolution, presented the proposal for a World Interfaith Harmony Week before the UN General Assembly in New York where it was adopted unanimously.

The basis for the World Interfaith Harmony Week is the A Common Word Initiative which was authored by Prince Ghazi bin Muhammad and released in 2007. The A Common Word Initiative and the World Interfaith Harmony Week stem from the idea that humanity is bound together by the two shared commandments of 'Love of God and Love of the Neighbor' or 'Love of the Good and Love of the Neighbor'.

In his speech at the UN General Assembly, Prince Ghazi of Jordan stated that the aim of the Interfaith Harmony Week would be fulfilled by:

permanently and regularly encouraging the silent majority of preachers to declare themselves for peace and harmony and providing a ready-made vehicle for them to do so ... if preachers and teachers commit themselves on the record once a year to peace and harmony, this means that when the next interreligious crisis or provocation occurs, they cannot then relapse into parochial fear and mistrust, and will be more likely to resist the winds of popular demagoguery

The draft resolution A/65/L5 titled the World Interfaith Harmony Week put forth by Jordan was sponsored by 29 co-sponsors - Albania, Azerbaijan, Bahrain, Bangladesh, Costa Rica, the Dominican Republic, Egypt, El Salvador, Georgia, Guatemala, Guyana, Honduras, Kazakhstan, Kuwait, Liberia, Libya, Mauritius, Morocco, Oman, Paraguay, Qatar, the Russian Federation, Saudi Arabia, Tanzania, Tunisia, Turkey, the United Arab Emirates, Uruguay and Yemen.

== Text of the Resolution ==
The UN resolution on the World Interfaith Harmony Week states:

The General Assembly,

Recalling its resolutions 53/243 of 6 October 1999 on the declaration and programme of action relating to a culture of peace; 57/6 of November 2002 concerning the promotion of a culture of peace and non-violence; 58/128 of 19 December 2003 on the promotion of religious and cultural understanding, harmony and cooperation; 64/164 of 18 December 2009 on the elimination of all forms of intolerance and discrimination based on religion or belief;

64/81 of 7 December 2009 on the promotion of interreligious and intercultural dialogue, understanding and cooperation for peace, and 64/14 of 10 November 2009 on the Alliance of Civilizations. Recognising the imperative need for dialogue among different faiths and religions in enhancing mutual understanding, harmony and cooperation among people. Recalling with appreciation various global, regional and sub-regional initiatives on mutual understanding and interfaith harmony including, inter alia, the Tripartite Forum for Interfaith Cooperation for Peace, and the “A Common Word”.

Recognising that the moral imperatives of all religions, convictions, and beliefs call for peace, tolerance, and mutual understanding:

1. Reaffirms that mutual understanding and inter-religious dialogue constitute important dimensions of a culture of peace.
2. Proclaims the first week of February of every year the World Interfaith Harmony Week between all religions, faiths and beliefs.
3. Encourages all States to support, on a voluntary basis, the spread of the message of interfaith harmony and goodwill in the world’s churches, mosques, synagogues, temples and other places of worship during that week based on Love of God and Love of the Neighbour, or based on Love of the Good and Love of the Neighbour, each according to their own religious traditions or convictions.
4. Requests the secretary general to keep the General Assembly informed of the implementation of the present resolution.

== Annual events and prizes ==
Organisation from around the world are invited to set up events promoting interfaith harmony, with the added incentive of 3 annual prizes sponsored by the King of Jordan, in the amount of $25000, $15000 and $5000 with a corresponding gold, silver and bronze model. The prize, personally presented by the King at a ceremony in Amman, is awarded based on a decision of a jury composed, among other personalities, of Princess Areej Ghazi and Patriarch Theophilus of Jerusalem.

Since 2013, the winners have been:

- 2013: Interfaith Mediation Centre, Kaduna
- 2014: First Prize - United Nations Interfaith Harmony Partners – Zamboanga – Silsilah Dialogue Movement
- 2014: Second Prize - Mohd. Abdul Saeed Khan alias Saeed Khan Falahi of Shahjahanpur, Uttar Pradesh, India.
- 2015: Universal Interfaith Peace Mission
- 2015: Third Prize - Toronto World Interfaith Harmony Week Steering Committee
- 2016: Euclid University

== In popular culture ==
In February 2015, British singer-songwriter and composer Sami Yusuf released "The Gift of Love", which he called an "Interfaith anthem" to coincide with World Interfaith Harmony Week. The music video was filmed in Jordan (at Petra, at the baptism site of Jesus, Wadi Rum) and in holy sites in Jerusalem.

== See also ==
- World Religion Day
