= National Consortium for Academics and Sports =

The National Consortium for Academics and Sports (NCAS) is an American organization of colleges and universities that have agreed to help student athletes finish their decrees. NCAS was established in 1985 by Richard Lapchick at the Center for the Study of Sports in Society at Northeastern University. The NCAS National Office was relocated to Orlando, Florida on the campus of the University of Central Florida in 2001.

== Mission and purpose ==
The mission of NCAS is to

"create a better society by focusing on educational attainment and using the power and appeal of sport to positively affect social change."

By joining the NCAS, a college or university agrees to bring back, tuition-free, their own former student-athletes who competed in revenue and non-revenue producing sports and were unable to complete their degree requirements. In exchange, these former student-athletes agree to participate in school outreach and community service programs addressing social issues of America's youth.

== Programs and services ==
NCAS members are entitled to a variety of programs and services that center around leadership, education and community service. NCAS programs focus on topics ranging from diversity management training, gender violence prevention, alcohol abuse education, outreach, degree completion, and student-athlete recognition.

- The Mentors in Violence Prevention (MVP) Program is a program to motivate student-athletes and student leaders to solve problems such as rape, battering and sexual harassment. The mixed gender, racially diverse MVP Program, composed of former professional and college athletes, motivates men and women to work together in preventing gender violence utilizing a bystander approach to prevention. MVP National is presented in partnership by the Center for the Study of Sport in Society (CSSS).
- The Teamwork Leadership Institute (TLI) helps college senior administrators and athletic department staffs, through the provision of diversity training services, apply the principles of teamwork to all areas of athletic departments.
- The Alcohol Response-Ability: Foundations for Student-Athletes program is a 90-minute, internet-based alcohol education and life skills program designed specifically for student-athletes and those who work with them in the college and university setting.
- National STUDENT-Athlete Day (NSAD), celebrated annually on April 6, honors student-athletes who have achieved excellence in academics and athletics, while making significant contributions to their communities.
- Community Service and Outreach Program, arranges for professional and college student-athletes to assist in the coordination of after-school programs on topics related to decreasing violence, avoiding substance abuse, understanding diversity, balancing academics and athletics, goal-setting, sportsmanship, citizenship and conflict resolution.
- Degree Completion Program allows former student-athletes to complete their education in exchange for community service. Student-athletes who entered the member institution on an athletic scholarship, in a revenue or non-revenue producing sport are eligible to be readmitted, if academically eligible. Tuition is provided by the institution in the same proportion as it was during the student's last year of eligibility. Student-athletes are able to continue their education as long as they are making progress toward their degree. In exchange for their tuition, student-athletes participate in the school's community service and outreach program.

== Annual events ==
The NCAS provides an annual conference for members on social issues they face in their athletic departments and communities .

Past speakers have included Myles Brand, president, NCAA; Floyd Keith, executive director, Black Coaches Association; Joe Crowley, president, University of Nevada; Charlotte Westerhaus, vice president for diversity and inclusion, NCAA; Bill Curry, ESPN; and coaches Herman Boone and William Yoast, "Remember the Titans".

The NCAS Giant Steps Awards Banquet has taken place annually since 1988 in conjunction with National STUDENT-Athlete Day, Giant Steps Awards are awarded at the banquet.

In 1999, the NCAS Hall of Fame Ceremony was added to the Giant Steps Awards Banquet. Since then, Nancy Lieberman, Eddie Robinson, Dean Smith, Muhammad Ali, Lee Elder, Julius Erving, Jackie Joyner-Kersee, Rachel Robinson, Jackie Robinson (posthumously), Richard DeVos, Thomas “Satch” Sanders, Colonel Lawrence Roberts and Dr. Roscoe C. Brown Jr. have been inducted.

== Leadership ==
Richard E. Lapchick has served the NCAS as its executive director since its inception in 1985. Human rights activist, pioneer for racial equality, internationally recognized expert on sports issues, scholar and author Richard E. Lapchick is often described as “the racial conscience of sport.” Lapchick is a regular columnist for ESPN.com and The Sports Business Journal, and a regular contributor to the op-ed page of the Orlando Sentinel. He has written more than 450 articles and has given more than 2,600 public speeches. His 12th book, 100 Heroes: People in Sports Who Make This a Better World, was published by the NCAS in 2006.

Tom Kowalski has been the director of the National Consortium for Academics and Sports Midwest Regional Office and president of The Transit Group.

== Quotations ==
- "The National Consortium for Academics and Sports is a necessary organization because, in and of itself, sports is neither immoral nor moral, it needs the character of the people behind the sport. And that's the role the NCAS serves. It's the conscience, particularly, of college sport." -John Rawlings, senior VP and editor, Sporting News
- "This event is extremely important to me; one because I'm being inducted into the [NCAS] Hall of Fame with my late husband; and two, because we're celebrating the development of our youth. This organization is doing an enormous job in helping young people graduate from college, develop their leadership skills, and become interested in giving back to the community." -Rachel Robinson, 2004 NCAS Hall of Fame Inductee and Founder, Jackie Robinson Foundation
