= International Organization for Sustainable Development =

The International Organization for Sustainable Development (IOSD) is an international non-governmental organization dedicated to promoting an understanding of Sustainable Development anchored in the needs and realities of developing countries.

== History, goals and programs ==
The organization was established in 1995 by a group of private and public agents interested in implementing practical programs and promoting reflection on the theme of Sustainable Development outside the developed Western world.

IOSD's most notable initiative was the constitution of the Euclid University Consortium (EUC) in partnership with the universities of N'Djamena, Bangui and ULI Brussels. Since October 2006, the consortium offers a joint degree program in Sustainable Development. An agreement signed in December 2006 by IOSD and the Islamic Chamber of Commerce and Industry provides for scholarship and technical programs.

IOSD is also active in other areas, notably technological support, grant-writing support and the Center on Desertification and Reforestation project.

IOSD is an accredited Observer NGO of the World Intellectual Property Organization (WIPO).

== Structure and Organization ==
The Organization, headquarters in Brussels, Belgium, is headed by a Secretary-General, Mr. Syed Zahid Ali.

Its agencies are IOSD DirectAid, CED^R (Center on Ecological Desertification and Reforestation) and HBTI (Human Bioethics Treaty Initiative).

The International Peace Commission NGO is, since 2006, a participating member of IOSD.
