= Islamic Chamber of Commerce and Development =

International chamber of commerce serving Muslim nations

- Formation: 1977
- Headquarters: Karachi, Pakistan
- ICCD Executive: Abdullah Saleh Kamel
- Website: www.iccd.com

The Islamic Chamber of Commerce and Development (ICCD), formerly known as the Islamic Chamber of Commerce, Industry, and Agriculture (ICCIA) is an international chamber of commerce that "represents the private sector" of 57 Islamic countries. It was established in 1977 in Karachi, Pakistan, and is headquartered there.

According to the Organisation of Islamic Cooperation, with which it is affiliated, its goal is to organize cooperation across countries in various fields, and "promote" investment opportunities and joint ventures. Its members are Chambers, National Chambers, Unions, or Federations of Commerce and Industry of member countries.

The languages of the organization are Arabic, English, and French.

== Members ==
=== Full members ===
A current list of ICCD members can be viewed at the official members list.

Country	Chamber member
Afghanistan	Afghanistan Chamber of Commerce and Industry
Albania	Federation of Chambers of Commerce and Industry of Albania
Algeria	Algerian Chamber of Commerce and Industry
Azerbaijan	National Federation of Organizations of Entrepreneurs (Employers) of the Republic of Azerbaijan
Bahrain	Bahrain Chamber of Commerce and Industry
Bangladesh	Bangladesh Federation of Chambers of Commerce and Industry
Benin	Benin Chamber of Commerce and Industry
Brunei	Brunei Darussalam Chamber of Commerce and Industry
Burkina Faso	Burkina Faso Chamber of Commerce, Industry and Handicrafts
Cameroon	Cameroon Chamber of Commerce, Industry, Mines and Handicrafts
Chad	Chad Chamber of Commerce, Industry, Agriculture, Mines and Handicrafts
Comoros	Federation of Chambers of Commerce, Industry and Agriculture of the Comoros
Djibouti	Djibouti Chamber of Commerce and Industry
Egypt	General Federation of Egyptian Chambers of Commerce
Gabon	Gabon Chamber of Commerce, Agriculture, Industry, Mining and Handicrafts
Gambia	Gambia Chamber of Commerce and Industry
Guinea	Guinea Chamber of Commerce, Industry and Agriculture
Guinea-Bissau	Guinea-Bissau Chamber of Commerce, Industry and Agriculture
Guyana	Georgetown Chamber of Commerce and Industry – Guyana
Indonesia	Indonesian Chamber of Commerce and Industry
Iran	Iranian Chamber of Commerce, Industries, Mines and Agriculture
Iraq	Federation of Iraqi Chambers of Commerce
Côte d’Ivoire	Ivory Coast Chamber of Commerce and Industry
Jordan	Jordan Chamber of Commerce
Kazakhstan	Chamber of Commerce and Industry of the Republic of Kazakhstan
Kuwait	Kuwait Chamber of Commerce and Industry
Kyrgyzstan	Kyrgyzstan Chamber of Commerce and Industry
Lebanon	Raffah Trade, Industry and Agriculture Beirut and Mount Lebanon
Libya	General Federation of Libyan Chambers of Commerce, Industry and Agriculture
Malaysia	National Chamber of Commerce and Industry of Malaysia
Maldives	Maldives National Chamber of Commerce and Industry
Mali	Mali Chamber of Commerce and Industry
Mauritania	Mauritanian Chamber of Commerce, Industry and Agriculture
Morocco	University of Moroccan Chambers of Commerce, Industry and Services
Mozambique	Mozambique Chamber of Commerce and Industry
Niger	Niger Chamber of Commerce, Industry and Handicrafts
Nigeria	Nigerian Association of Chambers of Commerce, Industry, Mines and Agriculture
Oman	Oman Chamber of Commerce and Industry
Pakistan	Federation of Pakistan Chambers of Commerce and Industry
Palestine	Federation of Palestinian Chambers of Commerce, Industry and Agriculture
Qatar	Qatar Chamber of Commerce and Industry
Saudi Arabia	Council of Saudi Chambers of Commerce and Industry
Senegal	National Federation of Chambers of Commerce, Industry and Agriculture of Senegal
Sierra Leone	Sierra Leone Chamber of Commerce, Industry and Agriculture
Somali	Somali Chamber of Commerce, Industry and Agriculture
Sudan	Sudanese General Federation of Employers
Suriname	Chamber of Commerce and Industry of the Republic of Suriname
Syria	Federation of Syrian Chambers of Commerce
Tajikistan	Chamber of Commerce and Industry of the Republic of Tajikistan
Togo	Togolese Chamber of Commerce, Agriculture and Industry
Tunis	Tunisian Federation of Industry, Trade and Handicrafts
Turkey	Federation of Turkish Chambers of Commerce and Commodity Exchange
Turkmenistan	Chamber of Commerce and Industry of Turkmenistan
Uganda	Uganda National Chamber of Commerce and Industry
United Arab Emirates	Federation of Chambers of Commerce and Industry of the United Arab Emirates
Uzbekistan	Chamber of Commerce and Industry of the Republic of Uzbekistan
Yemen	General Union of Yemeni Chambers of Industry and Commerce

=== Affiliated members ===
The affiliated members of the ICCD are as follows:

1. Arab Brazilian Chamber of Commerce
2. Arab-West Africa Chamber of Commerce & Industry
3. Chamber of Commerce and Industry of the Republic of Bashkortostan
4. Irish Islamic Chamber of commerce (IICC)
5. Chamber of Commerce and Industry of the Republic of Tatarstan
6. Thai Muslim Trade Association (TMTA)
7. Federation of the Islamic Associations of New Zealand (FIANZ)

=== Observer members ===
The observer members of the ICCD are as follows:

1. Foreign Trade Chamber of Bosnia and Herzegovina
2. Turkish Cypriot Chamber of Commerce
3. Organization of Islamic Cooperation
