= National Academy of Sports Editors =

American industry association of professionals associated with sports news

The National Academy of Sports Editors is an industry association of professionals associated with the sports news business. Its membership is a cross-section of American sports editors, writers, and broadcasters.

The academy bestows the Victor Award on athletes it determines are the country's most outstanding professional and amateur athletes and coaches, the Victor Awards consistently attract sports legends and famous presenters alike. Notable award winners include Michael Jordan (basketball), Muhammad Ali (boxing), Tiger Woods (golf), Mia Hamm (soccer), Tim Duncan (basketball) and Serena Williams (tennis). Special awards have also been presented to Mark Spitz, LeRoy Neiman, Reggie Jackson, and Minnie Miñoso.

The Victor Awards benefit the world-renowned City of Hope Cancer Center in Los Angeles.
