= Durham College (North Carolina) =

Defunct college in Durham, North Carolina

Durham College (also known as Durham Business College and previously as McCauley Business School and Durham Business School) was a junior college in Durham, North Carolina. It was opened 1947 and closed in 1980.

== Degrees ==
Degrees included:

- Executive Secretarial
- Legal Secretarial
- Business Administration
- Automation Secretarial
- Accounting
- Medical Secretarial
- Management and Computer Programming
- Pollution Control Administration
- Environmental Science Technology
- Laboratory Technicians
- Court Reporting

== Locations ==
- Originally in a five-room house on what is currently South Roxboro St.
- 1958, 2635 Fayetteville Rd.
- 1961, relocated to 404-406 South Mangum Street due to the Durham School board occupying the Elementary School that the school had previously used as its campus.
- 1966, 3128 Fayetteville Street.

== History ==
The school was founded by Dr. Lucinda McCauley Harris as "McCauley Business School" in 1946 for the purpose of training negros for business careers. In 1966, Durham College attempted to get accreditation from the Accrediting Commission for Business Schools. In 1970, the college was licensed by the North Carolina Board of Education. In 1971, the name was changed to Durham College and the school was accredited for Business by the Association of Independent Colleges and Schools. In 1972, the institution was accredited by the Southern Association as a candidate for regional accreditation and in 1973 it was re-licensed by the North Carolina Board of Education to award the degree Associate of Applied Science (AAS) in all of its two-year programs. Also in 1973, Durham College received a $143,000 grant for a comprehensive development program for the college from the Department of Health, Education and Welfare, under Title III of the Higher Education Act of 1965. On December 6, 1977, Muhammad Ali spoke at the opening of the new athletic facility that was named after him (Muhammad Ali Health and Physical Education Building).

=== Closing ===
In June 1978, the planning committee of the University of North Carolina Board of Governors voted to deny the school a license, however a restraining order was gotten to allow the school to continue doing business and granting degrees. Durham College had its accreditation revoked in August 1979. Classes were suspended in the Fall of 1979, but a funding drive in early 1980 attempted to raise $100,000 to reopen the campus. In March 1980, foreclosure was threatened on the two dormitories on campus. In October 1980, the Board of Trustees authorized the North Carolina Department of Archives to take custody of student records.

== Presidents ==
- Dr. Lucinda McCauley Harris (1947–1974)
- Dr. James W. Hill (1974–1980)
