= University of N'Djamena =

University in Chad

Coordinates: 12.1047°N 15.0444°E

- جامعة انجامينا (Arabic); Université de N'Djamena (French)
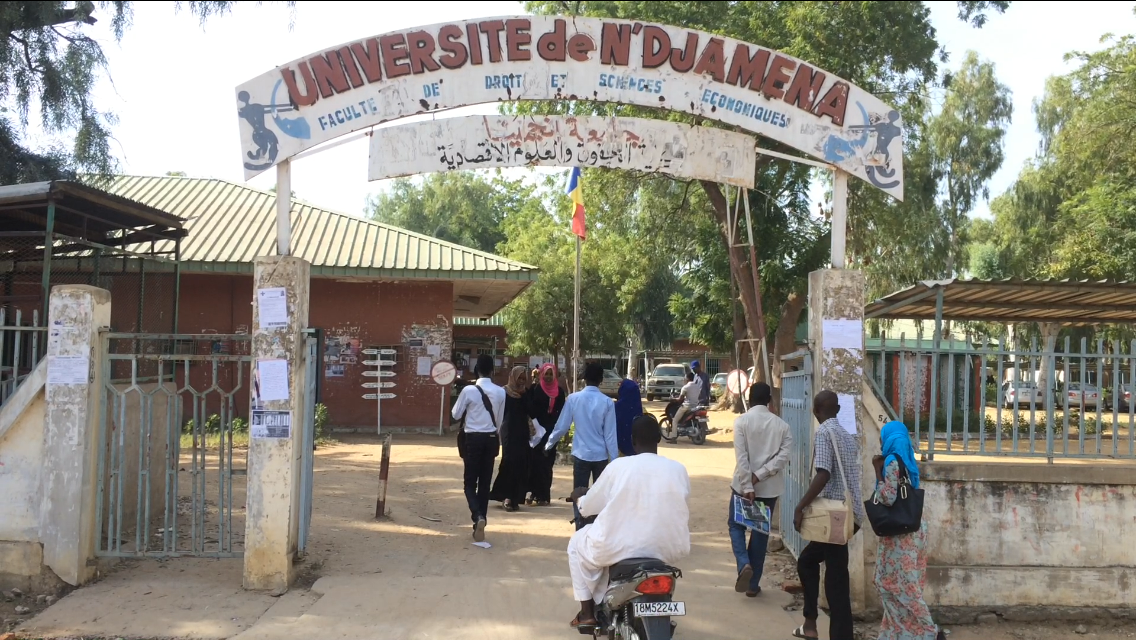
- Motto: Noctem Flammis Funalia Vincunt
- Motto in English: The Night is Conquered by Flames of Lanterns
- Type: Public
- Established: 1971; 55 years ago as University of Chad; 1994; 32 years ago as University of N'Djamena
- Location: N'Djamena, Chad
- Campus: Urban
- Nickname: UNDT
- Website: University website

The University of N'Djamena (Arabic: جامعة انجامينا, French: Université de N'Djamena; short name: UNDT) is the leading institution of higher education located in N'Djamena in Chad. It was created in 1971 as the University of Chad, and was renamed "University of N'Djamena" in 1994.

== See also ==
- List of Islamic educational institutions
- Euclid Consortium, the university's international joint extension
