= List of first-generation college students in the United States =

Notable first-generation college graduates in the United States

This is a list of notable first-generation college graduates in the United States arranged alphabetically by last name.

To be included in this compilation, the individual must meet Wikipedia notability requirements, and there must be reliable sources that verify that the person is a first-generation college graduate in the United States, meaning that neither parent or guardian completed a four year degree.

Note: terms or phrases such as "first in family" or "first to go" meet the requirement of first-generation college.

== Individuals by last name ==
=== A ===
- Ali, Mahershala – an award-winning actor best known for roles in Green Book, House of Cards, and Luke Cage
- Ashe, Arthur - professional tennis player and three time Grand Slam winner
- Atekwana, Estella - pioneering geophysicist, biogeophysicist, and academic administrator

=== B ===
- Ballmer, Steve - an entrepreneur, investor, owner of the Los Angeles Clippers, and former CEO of Microsoft
- Beam, John - high school and college football coach, Laney College athletics director, and community advocate
- Becerra, Xavier - attorney and politician; former U.S. Secretary of Health and Human Services
- Bettis, Jerome - former professional football running back who played in the National Football League (NFL) for 13 seasons, primarily with the Pittsburgh Steelers
- Bordas, Juana - Nicaraguan American leadership scholar and community activist; she is the first Latina faculty at the Center for Creative Leadership
- Braugher, Andre - award-winning actor best known for his roles in Homicide: Life on the Street and Brooklyn Nine-Nine
- Brown, Claude - author of Manchild in the Promised Land
- Brown, Jim - professional football player (Cleveland Browns), civil rights activist, and actor
- Bryant, Natalia - model, philanthropist, and daughter of retired NBA player, Kobe Bryant
- Bull, Joseph - biomedical engineer and academic administrator--the first Native American to serve as a dean of engineering in the United States
- Burns, Ursula – an entrepreneur and former CEO of Xerox
- Burruss, Riley - reality television personality (The Real Housewives of Atlanta), musician, and entrepreneur

=== C ===
- Campoverdi, Alejandra – a women’s health advocate, best-selling author, and former White House aide
- Carter, Jimmy - politician and humanitarian who served as the 39th president of the United States
- Carson, Ben - retired neurosurgeon, academic, author, and government official who served as the 17th United States Secretary of Housing and Urban Development from 2017 to 2021
- Cauley, Kashana - author best known for The Survivalists and The Payback
- Chan, Priscilla – pediatrician, philanthropist, and co-founder of the Chan Zuckerberg Initiative
- Chastain, Jessica - actress and producer, known for roles in Zero Dark Thirty and The Help
- Chisholm, Shirley - politician who, in 1968, became the first Black woman to be elected to the United States Congress
- Collado, Shirley - former president of Ithaca College and the first Dominican American to serve as president of a U.S. four-year institution
- Cortez Masto, Catherine - U.S. senator from Nevada and first Latina elected to the U.S. Senate
- Cummings, Terry - former professional basketball player and Pentecostal minister

=== D ===
- Davis, Viola - acclaimed actress and film producer known for roles in The Help and How To Get Away with Murder
- Davis, Wendy - lawyer and politician from Fort Worth, Texas
- de Burgos, Julia - poet, journalist, and Civil Rights activist.
- Donaldson, Lily K. - scientist and Miss United States beauty pageant winner

=== E ===
- Erving, Julius - commonly known as "Dr. J"; retired professional basketball player for the Philadelphia 76ers

=== G ===
- Gary, Willie E. – trial lawyer, entrepreneur, and philanthropist who won multi-million-dollar verdicts against some of the largest corporations in the United States
- Gibson, Althea - professional tennis player and golfer; the first Black player to win a Grand Slam
- Ginsburg, Ruth Bader - lawyer and Associate Justice of the Supreme Court of the United States
- Glover, Victor – naval officer, test pilot, and NASA astronaut of the 2013 class
- González, Rigoberto - award winning poet, writer, and book critic
- Grande, Reyna - author known for her memoir, The Distance Between Us
- Griner, Brittney - professional basketball player and three-time Olympic gold medal winner

=== H ===
- Hamilton, Brian - entrepreneur, philanthropist, and co-founder of Sageworks
- Hanna, Kathleen - co-founder and lead singer of Bikini Kill, musician, and pioneer of the feminist punk riot grrrl movement
- Harris, Lucia - professional basketball player, considered to be one of the pioneers of women's basketball
- Harts, Minda - author of The Memo, public speaker, and workplace consultant
- Henderson, Thelton - federal judge and civil rights lawyer known for his work on civil rights and prison reform
- Hernández, José Moreno – engineer and first NASA astronaut from a Mexican migrant family
- Hill, Anita - lawyer, educator and author; known for her testimony in the 1991 Senate confirmation hearings for U.S. Supreme Court nominee Clarence Thomas
- Hobson, Mellody - entrepreneur, president and co-CEO of Ariel Investments, and former chair of Starbucks and DreamWorks Animation
- Holley-Bockelmann, Kelly - American astrophysicist now working at Netherlands Institute for Space Research in Leiden, NL.
- Houska, Tara - a tribal attorney, land defender and climate justice activist
- Hurston, Zora Neale - anthropologist and prolific author of works such as Their Eyes Were Watching God
- Hutchinson, Cassidy - a former White House aide who served as assistant to Chief of Staff Mark Meadows

=== J ===
- J. Cole - hip hop artist, writer, and record producer
- Jiménez, Francisco - writer and professor at Santa Clara University; co-founder of Bilingual Review
- Johnson, Mike – lawyer and politician serving as the 56th speaker of the United States House of Representatives
- Jordan, Michael - entrepreneur, retired professional basketball player of the Chicago Bulls, and minority owner of the Charlotte Hornets (NBA)

=== K ===
- Keith, Damon - federal judge and civil rights lawyer who famously ruled that the federal government is prohibited from intruding upon the private communication of its citizens forcing the Nixon administration to turnover the Watergate tapes
- Koontz, Dean - best-selling author known for suspense thrillers
- Krzyzewski, Mike – former college basketball coach at Duke University and philanthropist

=== L ===
- Lee, Gerald Bruce - federal judge and former U.S. district court judge
- Leon, Kenny - theater and television director known for Fences, A Soldier's Play, and Hairspray Live!

=== M ===
- Marshall, Cynthia "Cynt" - the first Black female CEO in the history of the National Basketball Association
- Marshall, Roger - physician and Republican senator from Kansas
- McClure, Adele - Virginia state delegate and public policy advocate
- McMillan, Terry - best-selling novelist known for her vivid portrayals of African American women's lives, relationships, and journeys of self-discovery, including Waiting to Exhale and How Stella Got Her Groove Back
- Meghan, Duchess of Sussex - member of the British royal family, media personality, entrepreneur, and actress
- Moody, Anne - author of Coming of Age in Mississippi
- Mowry, Tamera - actress who first gained recognition on the tv sitcom, Sister, Sister
- Mowry, Tia - actress who first gained recognition on the tv sitcom, Sister, Sister

=== N ===
- Newman, Paul - actor, filmmaker, racecar driver, philanthropist, and entrepreneur
- Norris, Dean - an American actor best known for playing Hank Schrader on the AMC series Breaking Bad

=== O ===
- Obama, Michelle - attorney, author, and First Lady of the United States from 2009-2017
- Olandria - model, influencer, and television personality
- Ortiz, Paul - historian of African American, Latinx, labor, and social movement history

=== P ===
- Pacheco, Isiah - professional football player
- Polanco, Dascha - a Dominican actress known for portraying the role of Dayanara "Daya" Diaz on the Netflix series Orange Is the New Black, and for the role of Cuca in the 2021 film In the Heights.
- Powell, Kevin - writer, activist, public speaker and television personality

=== Q ===
- Quiñones-Hinojosa, Alfredo - neurosurgeon, author, and researcher

=== R ===
- Ramirez, Angel - Iowa state representative and first Latina elected to the Iowa Legislature
- Robinson, Jackie - professional baseball player, who was the first African American to play in Major League Baseball
- Rodriguez, Richard - writer and author of Hunger of Memory: The Education of Richard Rodriguez
- Ruiz, Vicki L. – American historian who work focuses on Mexican-American women in the twentieth century has written or edited 14 books and published over 60 essays

=== S ===
- Sato, Kiyo - U.S. Air Force Veteran, author, retired nurse and Japanese internment survivor
- Scully, Vin - sportscaster, best known for his broadcast work in Major League Baseball, notably as the play-by-play announcer for the Los Angeles Dodgers
- Silva, Ree Ann - the creator of the Beauty blender makeup application sponge and the founder and CEO of the Beauty blender company
- Simmons, Ruth - an American professor and academic administrator and eighth president of Prairie View A&M University
- Smits, Jimmy - an American actor best known for his roles as Victor Sifuentes on L.A. Law, Detective Bobby Simone onNYPD Blue, Matt Santos onThe West Wing and Bail Organa in the Star Wars franchise
- Solorzano, Daniel G. – an American educator and researcher, known for his work in critical race theory, racial microaggressions, microaffirmations, and critical spatial analysis
- Sotomayor, Sonia - lawyer and jurist who serves as an associate justice of the Supreme Court of the United States
- Staley, Dawn - an American basketball coach and former player
- Swinney, Dabo - an American college football coach, currently serving as the head football coach at Clemson University

=== T ===
- Talley, André Leon - fashion journalist, stylist, creative director, author, and editor-at-large of Vogue magazine
- Taurasi, Diana – American former professional basketball player
- Thao, Sheng - politician and 51st mayor of Oakland, California
- Thompson, Tisha - LYS Beauty founder and CEO
- Tubbs, Michael – an American politician and the youngest mayor in Stockton's history and its first African-American mayor

=== U ===
- Ubiñas, Luis - businessman and nonprofit leader who served as president of the Ford Foundation

=== V ===
- Viramontes, Helena Maria - writer, activist, and professor

=== W ===
- Wagner, Gernot - Austro-American climate economist
- Warnock, Raphael - politician (junior senator from Georgia) and Baptist pastor
- Warren, Elizabeth - politician and former law professor who is the senior United States senator from the state of Massachusetts, serving since 2013
- Weiden, David Heska Wanbli - Lakota author, professor, and legal scholar known for Winter Counts
- Welteroth, Elaine – an American journalist, editor, author, television host, and former editor-in-chief of Teen Vogue
- Willis, Jan - Professor of Religion, Emerita at Wesleyan University and the author of books on Tibetan Buddhism
- Wu, Michelle - lawyer, politician and mayor of Boston, Massachusetts since 2021

=== Y ===
- Yang, Kelly - children’s author and lawyer

== See also ==
- First-generation college students in the United States
