= The Fellowship and Star =

Pub in Bellingham, London

Coordinates: 51.4327°N 0.0203°W

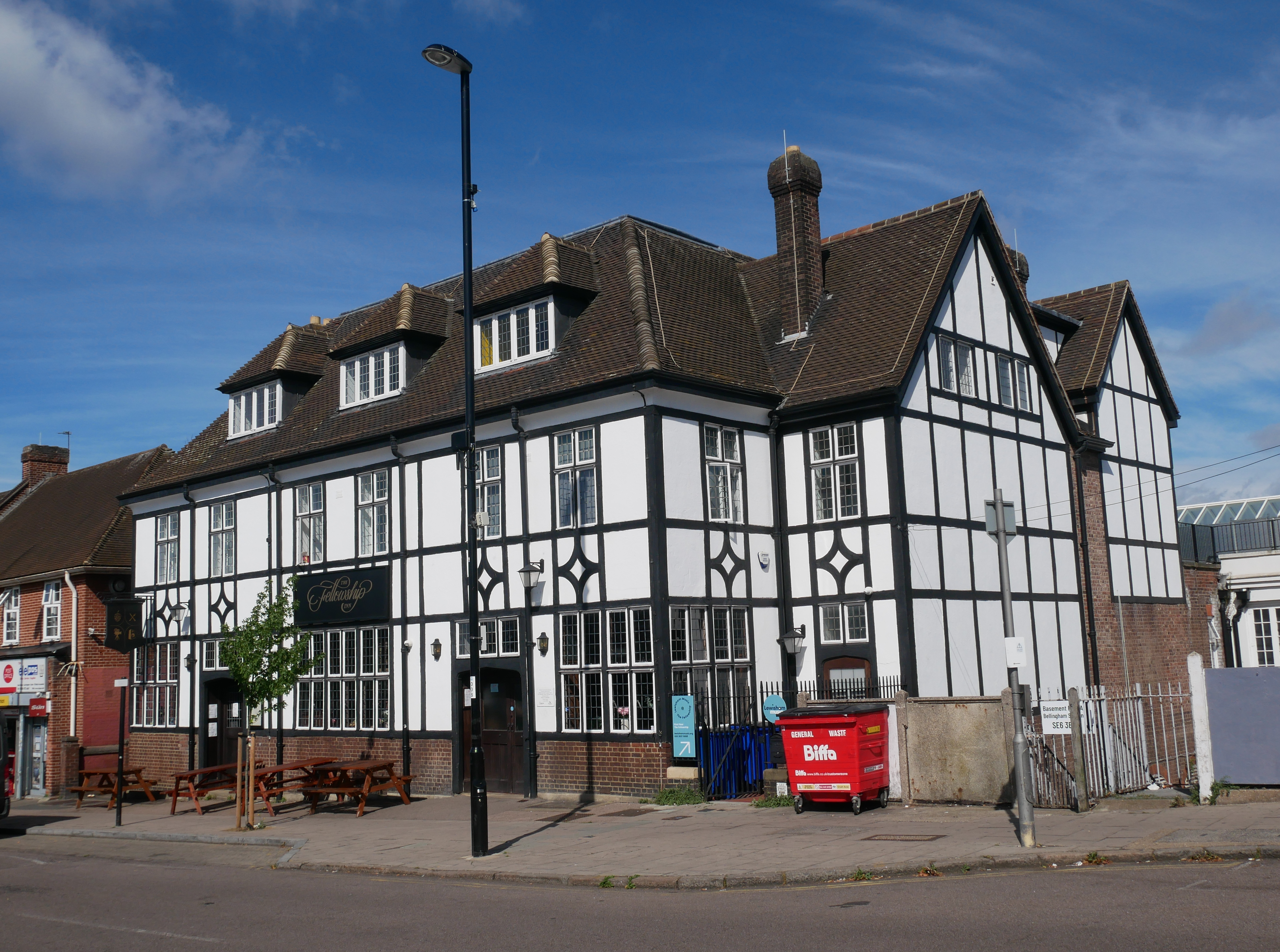
- The Fellowship in 2024
- Interactive map of the The Fellowship and Star area

General information
- Location: Randlesdown Rd, London, SE6 3BT
- Opened: 1924

Design and construction
- Designations

Listed Building – Grade II
- Designated: 8 March 2013
- Reference no.: 1413050

The Fellowship and Star is a Grade II listed pub at Randlesdown Road, Bellingham, London SE6 3BT.

== History ==
Built in 1923–24 and designed by the architect F. G. Newnham, the pub opened as The Fellowship Inn. It was the first pub to be built on a London housing estate, part of developments planned to ease inner city overcrowding after the First World War.

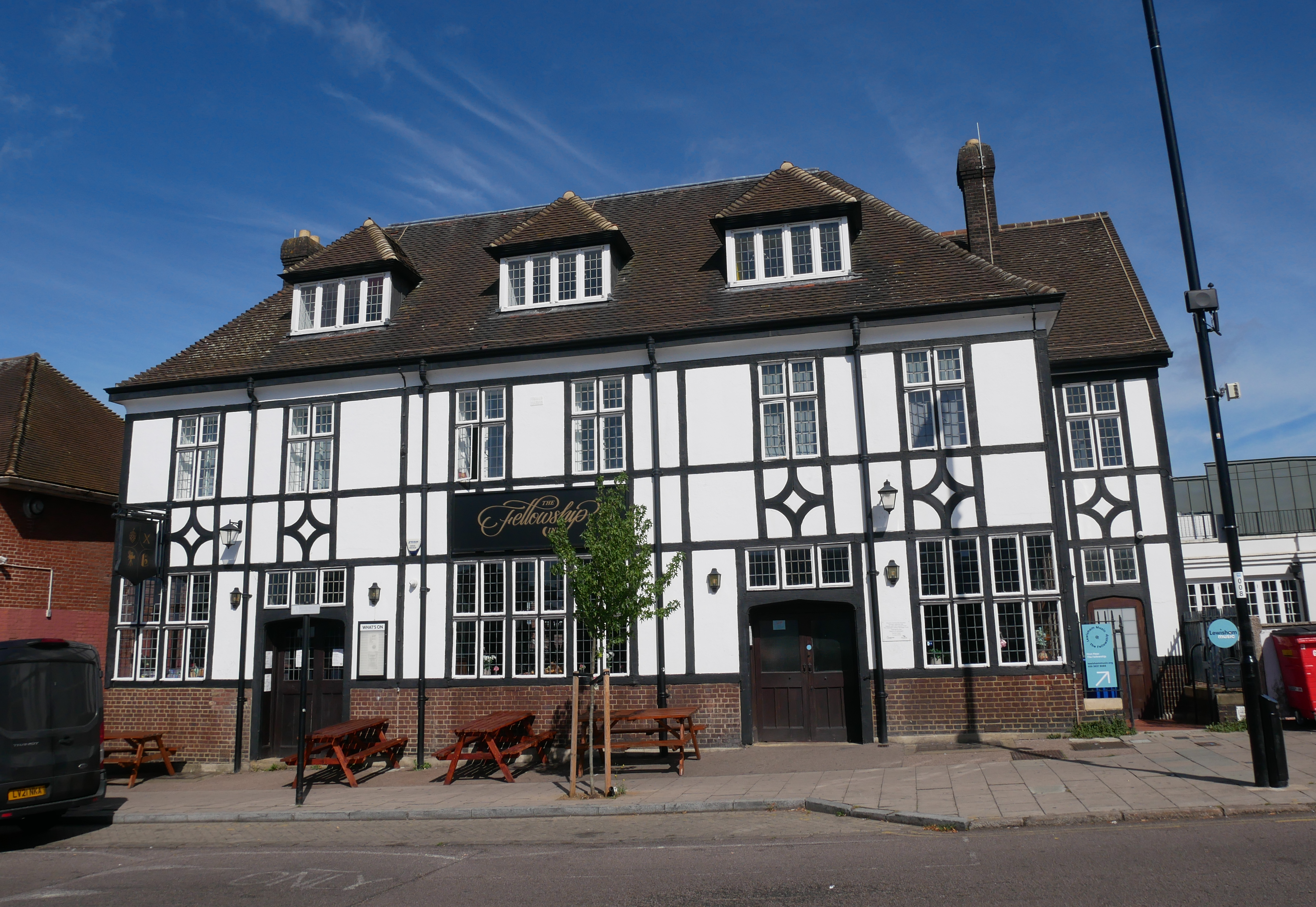
The south face of the pub

Under that name, it hosted gigs by bands including Fleetwood Mac and John Mayall & the Bluesbreakers, and was used as both a gym and a home by boxer Henry Cooper in the run-up to his 1963 fight against Cassius Clay.

In 2018 The Fellowship Inn underwent refurbishment and redevelopment to restore the interior. It reopened in June 2019 as The Fellowship and Star, including a cinema, café, music rooms and community spaces. It subsequently closed as a victim of COVID-19 in 2020 and re-opened on 21 September 2022 once again named The Fellowship Inn.

The pub is on Campaign for Real Ale's National Inventory of Historic Pub Interiors.
