= Abrigo =

Abrigo is a Spanish language surname meaning "coat".

Notable people with the surname include:

- Joe Abrigo (born 1995), Chilean footballer
- Miguel Abrigo (born 1974), Argentine footballer

Abrigo may also refer to:

- Abrigo, a financial software company.
