= Doug Jones (boxer) =

American boxer (1937–2017)

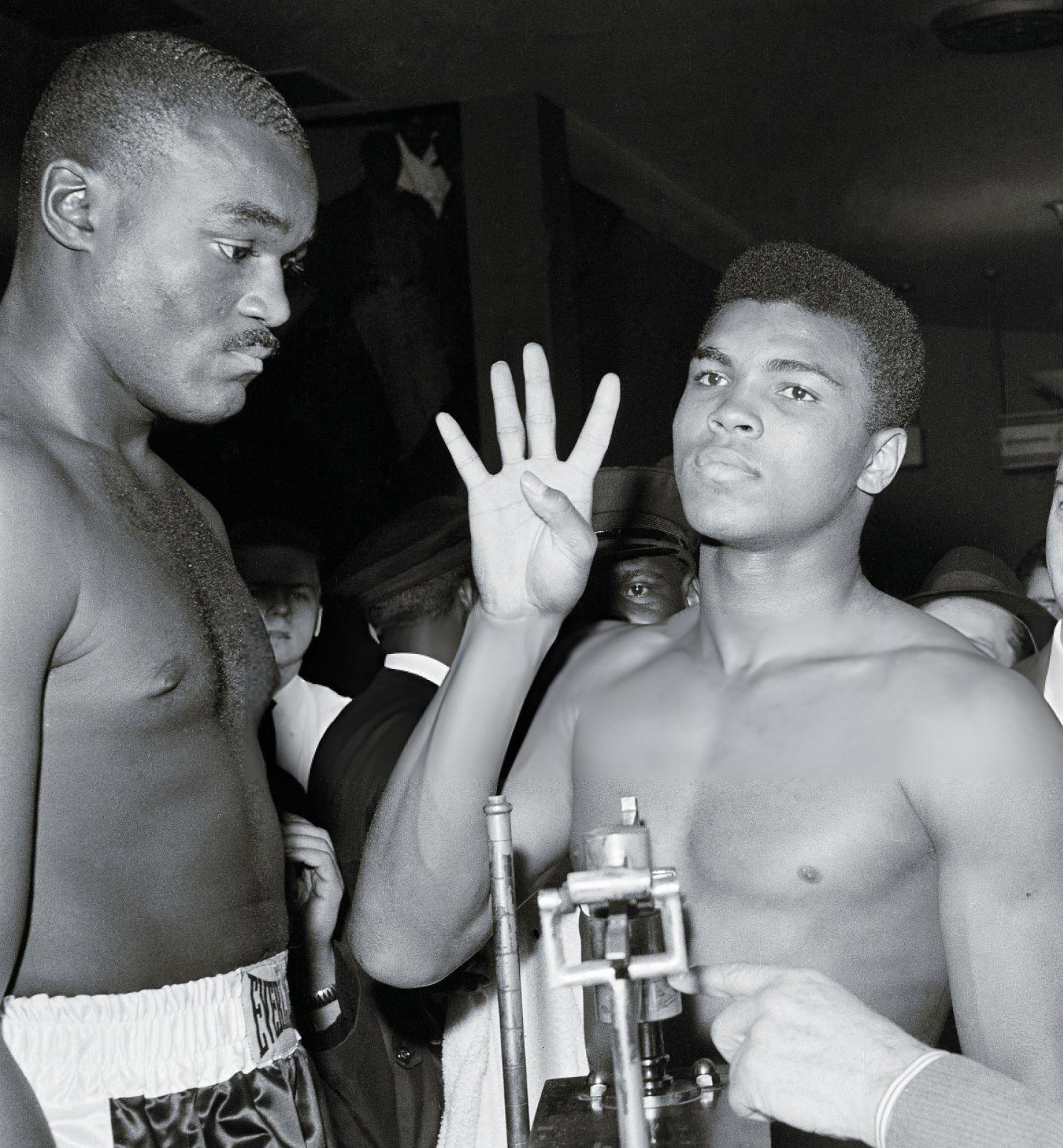
- Jones (left) in 1963, at the weigh in for his fight against Cassius Clay

Personal information
- Nickname: Turk
- Born: February 27, 1937 New York City, U.S.
- Died: November 14, 2017 (aged 80)
- Height: 6 ft 0 in (1.83 m)
- Weight: Light heavyweight, heavyweight

Boxing career
- Stance: Orthodox

Boxing record
- Total fights: 41
- Wins: 30
- Win by KO: 20
- Losses: 10
- Draws: 1

Doug Jones (February 27, 1937 – November 14, 2017) was an American professional boxer. He was the number-one contender in early 1964 and beat top contenders Zora Folley, light heavyweight champion Bob Foster, middleweight world champion Bobo Olson and world heavyweight title challengers Pete Rademacher and Tom McNeeley in his career. He is best known for his 1963 fight with Cassius Clay which he lost by unanimous decision.

== Early life ==
Jones was raised in New York City. He was a childhood friend of writer Claude Brown and appears in Brown's autobiographical novel Manchild in the Promised Land (1965) with the alias Turk.

== Boxing career ==
Doug "Pugilism" Jones started off his career successfully with 19 consecutive wins against mostly lightly regarded opponents but did defeat ex-middleweight champion Bobo Olson with an impressive knockout in the 6th round and Olympic gold medalist Pete Rademacher by knockout in the 5th round, he was the number one light heavyweight contender and an intimidating 19–0 when he fought number two heavyweight contender Eddie Machen and lost by unanimous decision. As number two light heavyweight contender Jones fought for the world light-heavyweight championship against Harold Johnson but lost a 15-round decision and went on to face number three heavyweight contender Zora Folley in a fight he again lost by decision.

He was number one light heavyweight contender, but moved up to the heavyweight division and went on to face future light heavyweight world champion Bob Foster who was undefeated 9–0; despite this he won by technical knockout in the 8th round. This set up a rematch with number three contender Zora Folley whom he knocked out in the 7th round. These two fights established Jones as number three contender in the heavyweight division. Against number two contender Cassius Clay he fought his best-known fight in March 1963, in which he lost a 10-round decision in a sold-out Madison Square Garden. Of 25 boxing writers at the Garden that night, 13 scored it for Jones, 10 favored Clay, and two called it even. The Ring selected this as its Fight of the Year in 1963. He then fought number eight contender Billy Daniels whom he beat on points moving himself up to number two heavyweight contender. He then fought heavyweight world title challenger Tom McNeeley, knocking him out in round 5. This meant he was number one heavyweight contender by January 1964.

He then beat fringe contender LeRoy Green by Unanimous decision, and was number one contender in 1964 before losing a rematch by split decision to Billy Daniels. He then fought number five contender George Chuvalo losing by technical knockout in the 11th round. This meant by the end of 1964 he was number seven contender.

In 1965 he fought four fights against Prentice Snipes, Harvey C. Jones, Chip Johnson and Archie McBride which he won by 2nd-, 4th-, 3rd- and 5th-round knockouts. This boosted him to number eight heavyweight contender. In 1966 he beat fringe contender Lou Bailey by 6th-round knockout to set up a WBA heavyweight title fight versus champion Ernie Terrell. He was number two ranked WBA contender and the underdog. He lost by unanimous decision.

He then fought number three contender Thad Spencer losing by unanimous decision. He then fought future undisputed heavyweight champion Joe Frazier who overwhelmed Jones and knocked him out in the sixth round. He then beat undefeated fringe contender Boone Kirkman by 7th-round knockout. Just a month later he faced Kirkman in a rematch, this time losing by 6th-round knockout. Kirkman went on to compile a record of 22–1 before being defeated again by two-time heavyweight champion George Foreman.

At age 30, Jones retired in 1967 after only winning one of his last five fights and not being considered a heavyweight contender after his loss to Kirkman. Overall, he compiled a record of 30 wins (20 by knockout), 10 losses, and 1 draw.

== Professional boxing record ==
30 Wins (20 knockouts, 10 decisions), 10 Losses (3 knockouts, 7 decisions), 1 Draw
Result	Record	Opponent	Type	Round	Date	Location	Notes
Loss	30–10–1	(United States) Boone Kirkman	TKO	6	August 10, 1967	(United States) Seattle Center Coliseum, Seattle, Washington	
Win	30–9–1	(United States) Boone Kirkman	TKO	7	June 29, 1967	(United States) Seattle Center Coliseum, Seattle, Washington	
Loss	29–9–1	(United States) Joe Frazier	KO	6	February 21, 1967	(United States) Philadelphia Arena, Philadelphia, Pennsylvania	
Loss	29–8–1	(United States) Thad Spencer	UD	10	October 14, 1966	(United States) Cow Palace, Daly City, California	
Loss	29–7–1	(United States) Ernie Terrell	UD	15	June 28, 1966	(United States) Sam Houston Coliseum, Houston, Texas	For WBA heavyweight title
Win	29–6–1	(United States) Lou Bailey	TKO	6	March 8, 1966	(United States) Miami Beach Auditorium, Miami Beach, Florida	
Win	28–6–1	(United States) Archie McBride	KO	5	December 28, 1965	(United States) Miami Beach Auditorium, Miami Beach, Florida	
Win	27–6–1	(United States) Chip Johnson	KO	3	November 30, 1965	(United States) Miami Beach Auditorium, Miami Beach, Florida	
Win	26–6–1	(United States) Harvey C. Jones	TKO	4	September 21, 1965	(United States) Miami Beach Auditorium, Miami Beach, Florida	
Win	25–6–1	(United States) Prentice Snipes	KO	2	September 14, 1965	(United States) Miami Beach Auditorium, Miami Beach, Florida	
Loss	24–6–1	(Canada) George Chuvalo	TKO	11	October 2, 1964	(United States) Madison Square Garden, New York City	
Loss	24–5–1	(United States) Billy Daniels	SD	10	August 14, 1964	(United States) Madison Square Garden, New York City	
Win	24–4–1	(United States) LeRoy Green	UD	10	May 16, 1964	National Stadium, Kingston, Jamaica	
Win	23–4–1	(United States) Tom McNeeley	TKO	5	February 3, 1964	(United States) New York Coliseum, Bronx, New York	
Win	22–4–1	(United States) Billy Daniels	PTS	10	June 14, 1963	(United States) Teaneck Armory, Teaneck, New Jersey	
Loss	21–4–1	(United States) Cassius Clay	UD	10	March 13, 1963	(United States) Madison Square Garden, New York City	
Win	21–3–1	(United States) Zora Folley	KO	7	December 15, 1962	(United States) Madison Square Garden, New York City	
Win	20–3–1	(United States) Bob Foster	TKO	8	October 20, 1962	(United States) Madison Square Garden, New York City	
Draw	19–3–1	(Germany) Erich Schoppner	PTS	10	September 29, 1962	(Germany) Westfalenhallen, Dortmund, North Rhine-Westphalia	
Loss	19–3	(United States) Zora Folley	UD	10	August 1, 1962	(United States) Denver Auditorium Arena, Denver, Colorado	
Loss	19–2	(United States) Harold Johnson	UD	15	May 12, 1962	(United States) Philadelphia Arena, Philadelphia, Pennsylvania	For NBA and lineal light heavyweight titles For vacant The Ring light heavyweight title
Loss	19–1	(United States) Eddie Machen	UD	10	December 2, 1961	(United States) Miami Beach Convention Hall, Miami Beach, Florida	
Win	19–0	(United States) Von Clay	TKO	10	August 26, 1961	(United States) Madison Square Garden, New York City	
Win	18–0	(United States) Pete Rademacher	KO	5	April 29, 1961	(United States) St. Nicholas Arena, New York City	
Win	17–0	(United States) Floyd McCoy	KO	3	March 13, 1961	(Canada) Maple Leaf Gardens, Toronto, Ontario	
Win	16–0	(United States) Carl Bobo Olson	KO	6	August 31, 1960	(United States) Chicago Stadium, Chicago, Illinois	
Win	15–0	(United States) Von Clay	SD	10	June 24, 1960	(United States) St. Nicholas Arena, New York City	
Win	14–0	(United States) Von Clay	UD	10	March 28, 1960	(United States) St. Nicholas Arena, New York City	
Win	13–0	(United States) LeRoy Green	UD	10	February 15, 1960	(United States) Academy of Music, New York City	
Win	12–0	(United States) Clarence Floyd	UD	10	January 8, 1960	(United States) Madison Square Garden, New York City	
Win	11–0	(United States) Juan Pomare	SD	10	November 9, 1959	(United States) Academy of Music, New York City	
Win	10–0	(United States) Chuck Whittley	TKO	4	October 23, 1959	(United States) Madison Square Garden, New York City	
Win	9–0	(United States) Richard Hill	TKO	4	August 14, 1959	(United States) Madison Square Garden, New York City	
Win	8–0	(United States) Sonny Boykins	TKO	2	June 15, 1959	(United States) St. Nicholas Arena, New York City	
Win	7–0	(United States) Rudy Corney	PTS	4	May 22, 1959	(United States) Madison Square Garden, New York City	
Win	6–0	(Canada) Gunnar Doerner	TKO	2	May 8, 1959	(United States) Syracuse War Memorial Arena, Syracuse, New York	
Win	5–0	(United States) Frank LaPola	PTS	6	March 6, 1959	(United States) Madison Square Garden, New York City	
Win	4–0	(United States) Edmund George	TKO	4	January 30, 1959	(United States) Madison Square Garden, New York City	
Win	3–0	(United States) Andre Tessier	TKO	3	December 19, 1958	(United States) Madison Square Garden, New York City	
Win	2–0	(United States) Vince Ferguson	TKO	2	September 19, 1958	(United States) Madison Square Garden, New York City	
Win	1–0	(United States) Jimmy McNair	PTS	4	August 22, 1958	(United States) Madison Square Garden, New York City	

== Exhibition boxing record ==
1 fight	0 wins	0 losses
Non-scored	1	

No.	Result	Record	Opponent	Type	Round, time	Date	Location	Notes
1	—N/a	0–0 (1)	(United States) Muhammad Ali	—N/a	6	October 27, 1966	(United States) Freedom Hall, Louisville, Kentucky, U.S.	Non-scored bout
