= Cassius Clay vs. Henry Cooper =

Boxing match

- Date: 18 June 1963
- Venue: Wembley Stadium, Brent, London, UK

Tale of the tape
Boxer	(United States) Cassius Clay	(United Kingdom) Henry Cooper
Nickname	"The Louisville Lip"	"Our 'Enry"
Hometown	Louisville, Kentucky, U.S.	Lambeth, London, UK
Pre-fight record	18–0 (14 KO)	27–8–1 (18 KO)
Age	21 years, 5 months	29 years, 1 month
Height	6 ft 3 in (191 cm)	6 ft 1 1/2 in (187 cm)
Weight	207 lb (94 kg)	185 lb (84 kg)
Style	Orthodox	Orthodox
Recognition	WBA/The Ring; No. 2 Ranked Heavyweight; WBC; No. 3 Ranked Heavyweight	WBA; No. 4 Ranked Heavyweight; WBC; No. 6 Ranked Heavyweight; The Ring; No. 8 Ranked Heavyweight; British and Commonwealth heavyweight champion

Result
- Clay won via 5th round TKO

Cassius Clay vs. Henry Cooper was a professional boxing match contested on 18 June 1963. It is sometimes referred to as the first of two Ali vs. Cooper fights, as a rematch would be organized after Clay changed his name to Muhammad Ali.

The bout was stopped by the referee in the fifth round after Cooper started bleeding excessively from a cut to the left eye. The bout is famous for being one of the four fights in which Clay was officially knocked down in the ring, as well as leading to the mandate that ringside handlers always have an extra pair of boxing gloves available.

== Background ==
After a close victory over Doug Jones, Clay's management decided to match him with Henry Cooper in London. Prior to the fight, Clay called Cooper "a tramp, a bum, and a cripple not worth training for." According to Clay, the Cooper fight was only a hiatus before "I demolish that ugly bear Liston." Responding to Clay, Cooper said in an interview: "Let him carry on. I'm on the gate, he's selling tickets and earning me good money."

== The Fight ==
35,000 spectators witnessed the fight, the first open-air fight at Wembley Stadium in 28 years. Clay weighed 207 pounds at this time; Cooper was about 20 pounds lighter. Clay also had a 4 1/2-inch reach advantage over Cooper.

=== Round 1 ===
In the first round, Cooper surprised Clay by utilizing offensive tactics, advancing on Clay and firing jabs and double jabs. Many of Cooper's stronger punch, the left hook, narrowly missed their mark due to Clay's ability to sway away from an incoming punch. Unexpectedly Clay retired to his corner at the end of the round with a slight trickle of blood flowing from his right nostril.

=== Round 2 ===
In the second round, Cooper continued with his aggressive tactics, but Clay's left jab now started connecting regularly with Cooper's face and a slight cut opened above Cooper's eyes.

=== Round 3 ===
In the third round, Clay connected with a left hook to Cooper's head, and followed this up with a right jab that opened a deep gash above Cooper's left eyebrow.

=== Round 4 ===
In the fourth round, with blood tricking down his face, Cooper continued with his aggressive tactics and started pursuing Clay who now started "fooling around", moving and throwing only intermittent punches at Cooper. Near the end of the round, Cooper threw three successive jabs as Clay stood against the ropes. Clay retreated further against the ropes when Cooper unleashed a left hook which struck Clay squarely on his jaw, lifting Clay on impact. Two things happened simultaneously at this stage which saved Clay from a possible knockout. First, the round came to an end. Second, the ropes had cushioned Clay's fall. As Cooper later recalled:

The ropes let him down gentle. You went from the top, to the middle, to the bottom rope. Now, if that had been in the middle of the ring, and he'd gone down on his head, that would have shook him up. But unfortunately he was on the ropes. If that had just been off them bloody ropes.

=== Round 4 - Round 5 interval ===
Angelo Dundee had to help Clay to his corner at the end of Round 4. Clay was clearly shaken up by the knockdown and was disoriented for a few seconds, attempting at one point to rise from his stool. Dundee appears to pop an ampule of smelling salts under Clay's nose (which would have been a disqualifying offense if he had been caught), although the film is inconclusive. Dundee then waved to referee Tommy Little to show him Clay's right glove, which had apparently split down a seam revealing horsehair stuffing which could have injured Cooper's eyes. Officials were requested to obtain a new pair of gloves for Clay, and popular myth has it that the resulting confusion led to the interval between round 4 and round 5 to be extended by 20 seconds which gave Clay extra time to recover.

=== Round 5 ===
In the fifth round, Clay adopted aggressive tactics himself, throwing a flurry of quick punches at Cooper which resulted in photographers near the ring splashed with Cooper's blood. Two minutes and fifteen seconds into the fifth round, the fight was stopped and Clay declared the winner, as he predicted.

== Aftermath ==
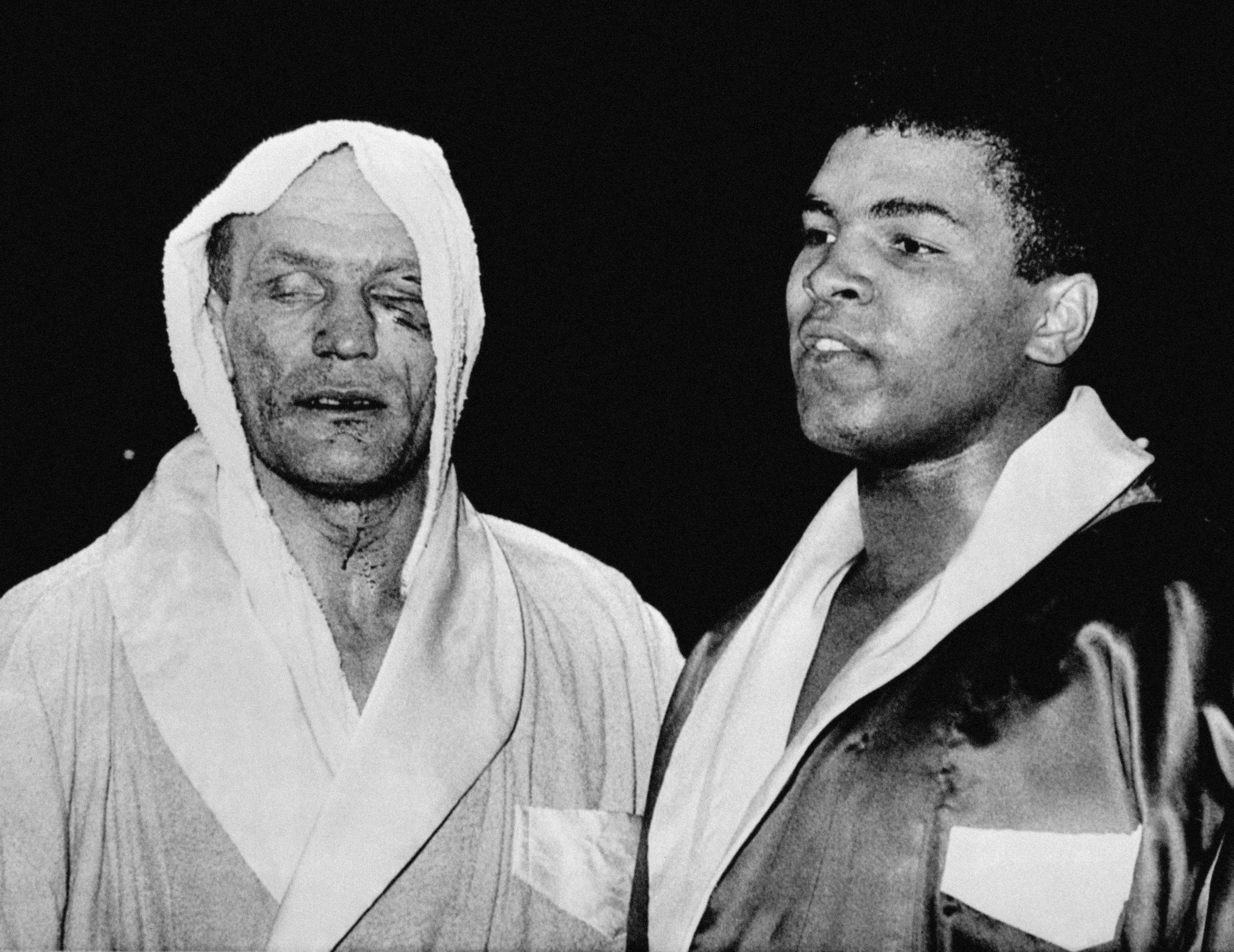
Clay (right) and Cooper (left) following their fight

Immediately after the fight, Clay retracted the abuses he had directed at Cooper before the fight and declared: "Cooper's not a bum any more. I underestimated him. He's the toughest fighter I ever met and the first to really drop me. He's a real fighter."

Cooper's left hook which had dropped Clay made him a celebrity after the fight. In Facing Ali, Stephen Brunt writes:

[W]hat lifted [Cooper] to a level of sports celebrity shared by only a handful of footballers was a single left hook delivered with perfect leverage and timing and aim to the jaw of Clay in June 1963. Not just one fight, but one punch, elevated Henry Cooper into a permanent state of grace. In the end, what he proved that day doesn't have anything to do with the joy of victory, which is why it was entirely beside the point that Clay got up and won, and won again the second time they fought. Instead it was a lesson about the nobility of having your finest moment--giving your best effort--when it absolutely matters most.

According to Cooper:

Clay always said that in the fifteenth round of the Frazier fight, he went down more from exhaustion, but 'the punch Cooper hit me with, he didn't just shake me. He shook my relations back in Africa.'

=== Rematch ===
The two would have a rematch in 1966 which has been described as being similar to the most one-sided moments of the first without the drama of Clay's knockdown. Clay would win again, this time by a 6th-round TKO.

== Undercard ==
Confirmed bouts:

== Broadcasting ==
Country	Broadcaster
United Kingdom	BBC

Preceded by vs. Doug Jones	Cassius Clay's bouts 18 June 1963	Succeeded by vs. Sonny Liston
Preceded by vs. Dick Richardson	Henry Cooper's bouts 18 June 1963	Succeeded by vs. Brian London
