= Cassius Clay vs. Doug Jones =

1963 boxing match

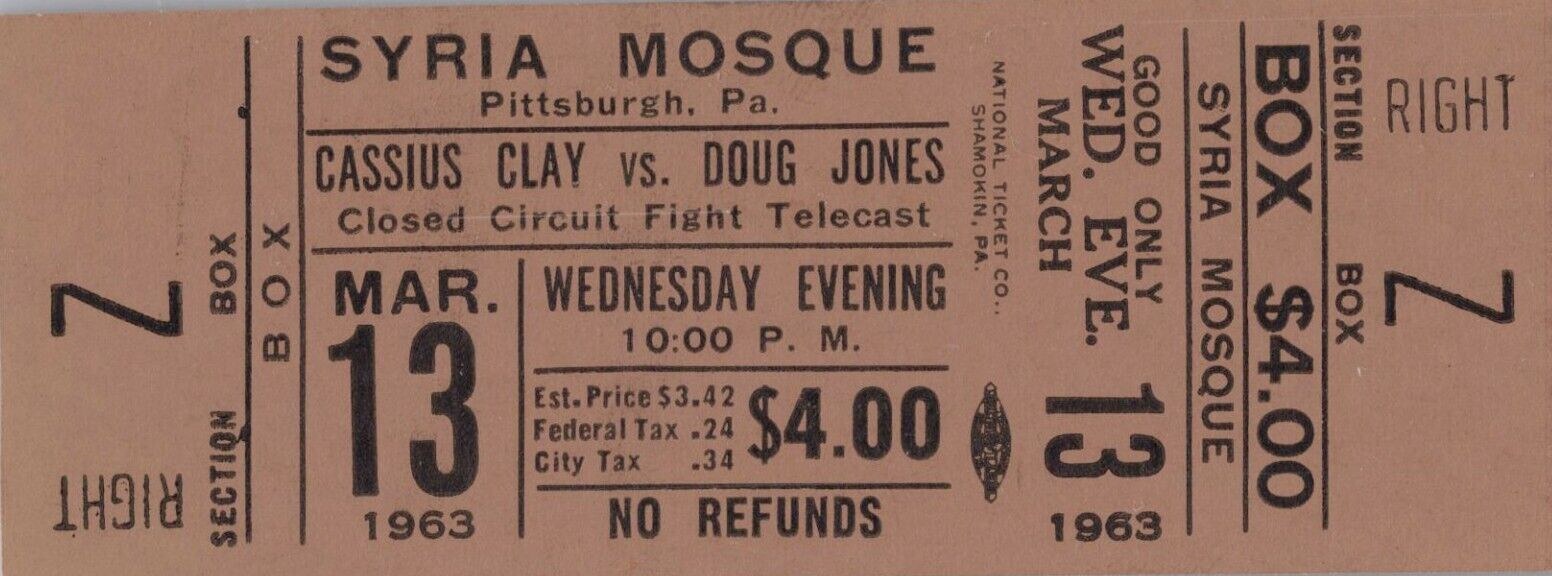
- Ticket for the match
- Date: March 13, 1963
- Venue: Madison Square Garden, New York City, New York

Tale of the tape
Boxer	(United States) Cassius Clay	(United States) Doug Jones
Nickname	"The Louisville Lip"	"Turk"
Hometown	Louisville, Kentucky	New York City, New York
Purse	$90,000	$75,000
Pre-fight record	17–0 (14 KO)	21–3–1 (13 KO)
Age	21 years, 1 month	26 years
Height	6 ft 3 in (191 cm)	6 ft 0 in (183 cm)
Weight	202 1/2 lb (92 kg)	188 lb (85 kg)
Style	Orthodox	Orthodox
Recognition	The Ring; No. 2 Ranked Heavyweight	The Ring; No. 3 Ranked Heavyweight

Result
- Clay won in 10 rounds by unanimous decision

Cassius Clay vs. Doug Jones was a professional boxing match contested on March 13, 1963. Clay won on points in what would prove to be one of the closest fights of his early professional career. The fight was named 1963's Fight of the Year by The Ring.

== Background ==
This was a ten-round heavyweight title elimination bout at Madison Square Garden in New York City. Clay and Jones held the second and third spots in the top ten rankings respectively. Former champion Floyd Patterson held the number one rank, and was preparing for a rematch with Sonny Liston.

Clay was given 3-1 odds of defeating Jones, and confidently predicted he would score a knockout victory in the fourth round.

== The fight ==
The fight was a hard-fought match; the more experienced Jones fought courageously against his larger opponent, taking everything thrown at him while countering effectively, greatly affecting Clay's timing. Neither man was knocked down, despite Clay attempting to knock his opponent out particularly in the third and fourth rounds. Upon failing to make his prediction, Clay was booed at the end of the fourth round. The final rounds picked up in speed and intensity, with Clay ultimately prevailing in a series of fierce exchanges, and went on to win the bout on points through a close but unanimous decision.

== Viewership and revenue ==
The fight was Madison Square Garden's first boxing sellout in 13 years, grossing a live gate of $304,943 ($3,131,963 inflation adjusted). The fight purses were $90,000 ($924,359 inflation adjusted) for Clay and $75,000 for Jones.

The fight had a closed-circuit theatre television broadcast, which drew 150,000 pay-per-view buys, including 9,000 in Texas and 1,500 at Syria Mosque. The fight grossed $500,000 ($5,135,326 inflation adjusted) in closed-circuit television revenue. In addition, the fight also had a pay-per-view home television broadcast in Toronto and Hartford, Connecticut. The fight's combined live gate and closed-circuit revenue was $804,943 ($8,267,290 inflation adjusted).

== Broadcasting ==
Country	Broadcaster
United Kingdom	BBC

== Undercard ==
Confirmed bouts:

Preceded by vs. Charlie Powell	Cassius Clay's bouts 13 March 1963	Succeeded by vs. Henry Cooper
Preceded by vs. Zora Folley	Doug Jones's bouts 13 March 1963	Succeeded by vs. Billy Daniels
Awards
Preceded by Joey Giardello vs. Henry Hank II	The Ring Fight of the Year; 1963	Succeeded by Sonny Liston vs. Cassius Clay
