= Brian Hamilton (businessman) =

American entrepreneur and philanthropist

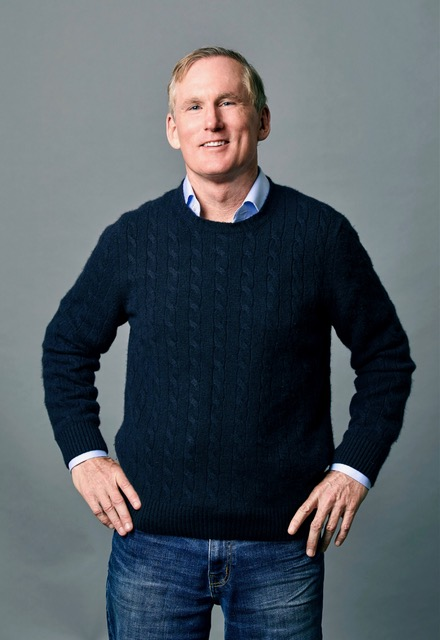
- Education: Sacred Heart University (BA); Duke University (MBA)
- Known for: Co-Founder, Sageworks
- Website: brianhamilton.org

Brian Hamilton is an American entrepreneur and philanthropist. He is the co-founder of Sageworks, now Abrigo, a fintech company that was acquired by Accel-KKR in 2018 and rebranded, and founder of the philanthropic organizations "Inmates to Entrepreneurs" and the "Brian Hamilton Foundation." He also stars in the television series Free Enterprise on ABC stations. In 2021, Hamilton invested in LiveSwitch (formerly Frozen Mountain), a Canadian video technology firm. Hamilton earned a bachelor's degree from Sacred Heart University and an MBA from Duke University.

== Early life and education ==
Hamilton grew up in Milford, Connecticut. He attended Fairfield College Preparatory School. Brian was the first in his family to graduate from college, earning a bachelor's degree from Sacred Heart University. Later he earned an MBA from Fuqua School of Business at Duke University.

== Career ==
Hamilton ran his own consulting business in Durham, North Carolina from 1990 to 1996. He offered consulting to people trying to start businesses. He also gave lectures and taught college courses. During a small business course, Hamilton mentioned the idea of software that would make reading financial statements easier for executives. One of the students, Sarah Tourville, liked the idea. They would go on to form the company Sageworks in 1998.

Sageworks was one of the first fintech companies. It grew into a firm of approximately 400 employees and was acquired by Accel-KKR in 2018 and rebranded to Abrigo. Hamilton sold his stake in the company as part of the acquisition.

In 2021, Hamilton invested in LiveSwitch (formerly Frozen Mountain), a video technology company.

== Charitable work ==
Hamilton was a lecturer at prisons, being under contract with the SBA to help with a minority set-aside program. One of his clients, Rev. Robert Harris, asked him to be part of a prison ministry where Hamilton would discuss entrepreneurship. This led to Hamilton founding "Inmates to Entrepreneurs", a program that offers training and mentoring for aspiring entrepreneurs who have criminal records.

In addition, he founded the Brian Hamilton Foundation, an organization that provides advice for young people and others who want to become entrepreneurs. He has provided commentary as an expert for The Wall Street Journal, MSNBC and Fox Business Network, and also sat on the board of trustees for Sacred Heart University.

In 2021, Hamilton became the star of the television series "Free Enterprise," which airs on ABC stations as part of the Hearst Media Production Group weekend programming block. The show features the stories of formerly incarcerated people with dreams of starting their own businesses.
