= Hunger of Memory =

1982 autobiography by Richard Rodriguez

- Author: Richard Rodriguez
- Language: English
- Genre: Autobiography
- Publication date: 1982
- Publication place: United States

Hunger of Memory: The Education of Richard Rodriguez is a 1982 autobiography by Chicano intellectual Richard Rodriguez, first published by David R. Godine.

== Summary ==
Mexican-American Rodriguez starts school in Sacramento, California understanding only 50 words of English. He completes his university studies in London. While on his academic journey, he becomes alienated from the culture of his birth, while assimilating into the world of academia. The book addresses affirmative action and bilingual education, among other themes. The book has been studied as a critical work of American minority literature.
