= Richard Rodriguez =

American writer (born 1944)

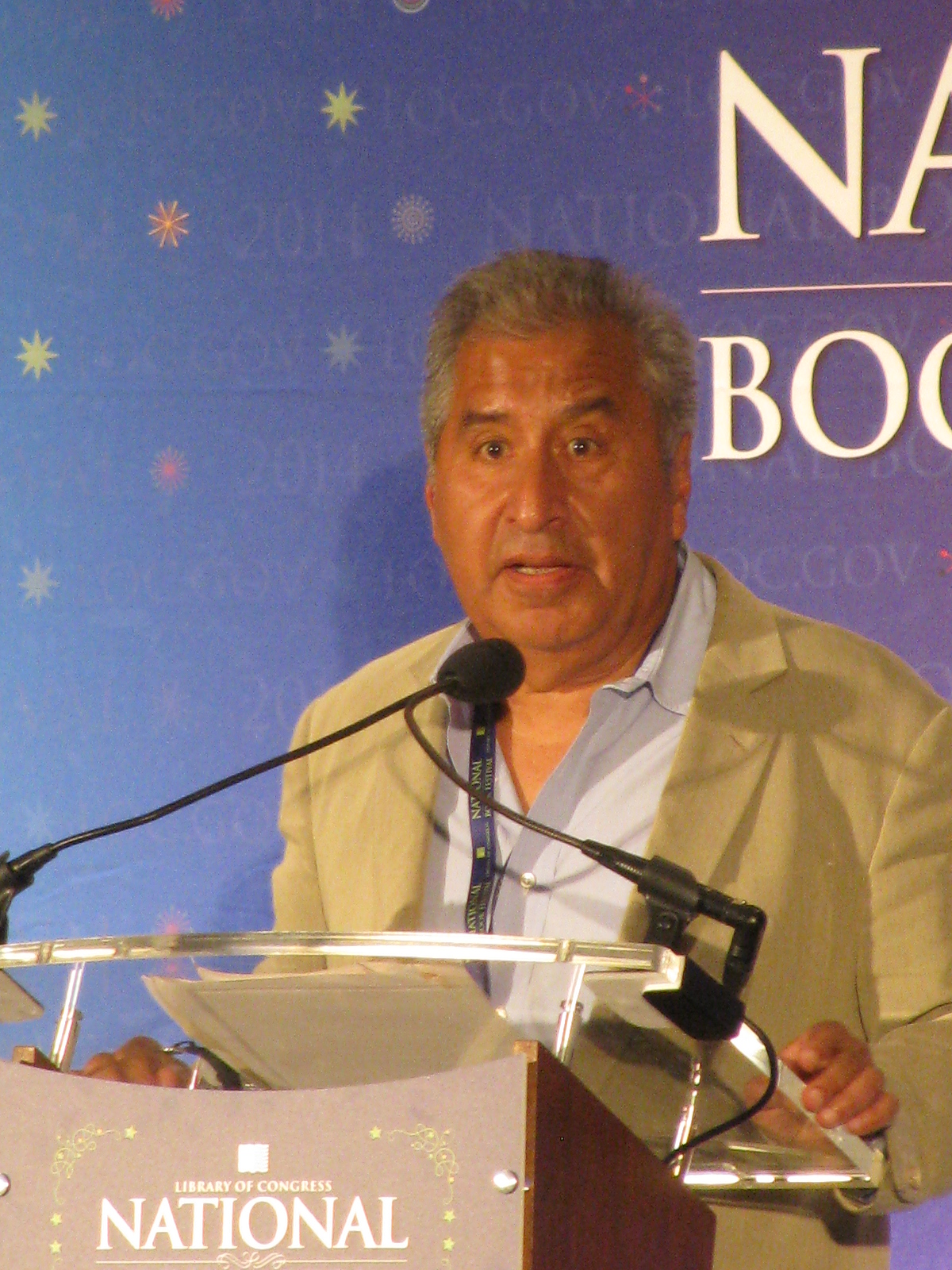
- Rodriguez at the 2014 National Book Festival
- Born: July 31, 1944 (age 82); San Francisco, California, United States
- Education: Christian Brothers High School
- Alma mater: Stanford University (BA); Columbia University (MA); UC Berkeley, graduate study Warburg Institute
- Occupation: Journalist
- Agent(s): Georges Borchardt, Inc., 136 East 57th St., New York, NY 10022
- Notable work: Hunger of Memory: The Education of Richard Rodriguez (autobiography)
- Television: PBS Newshour
- Parent(s): Leopoldo Rodriguez; Victoria Moran Rodriguez

Richard Rodriguez (born July 31, 1944) is an American writer who became famous as the author of the 1982 autobiography Hunger of Memory: The Education of Richard Rodriguez, a narrative about his intellectual development.

== Early life ==
Rodriguez was born on July 31, 1944, into a Mexican immigrant family in San Francisco, California where he spoke Spanish until age 6. His father was a manual laborer and his mother was a typist. As a youth in Sacramento, California, he delivered newspapers and worked as a gardener.

== Education ==
Rodriguez went to Catholic school starting from age 6 at Sacred Heart School in Sacramento and graduated from Bishop Armstrong High School.

He received a Bachelor of Arts from Stanford University in English in 1967, an Master of Arts in philosophy from Columbia University in 1969, and was a PhD candidate in English Renaissance literature at the University of California, Berkeley from 1969 to 1972. He also attended the Warburg Institute in London on a Fulbright fellowship in order to conduct research for his doctoral dissertation but ultimately did not complete the degree.

== Career ==
Rodriguez was offered a teaching position at Yale University, but declined the offer. Instead of pursuing a career in academia, Rodriguez suddenly decided to write freelance and take other temporary jobs. Rodriguez worked as a contributing editor to newspapers and magazines, including Harper's and the Los Angeles Times.

His first book, Hunger of Memory: The Education of Richard Rodriguez, was published in 1982 and won the Christopher Award. It was an account of his journey from being a "socially disadvantaged child" to becoming a fully assimilated American, from the Spanish-speaking world of his family to the wider, presumably freer, public world of English. It also explores his encounters with literacy. However, the journey was not without costs: his American identity was achieved only after a painful separation from his past, his family, and his culture. "Americans like to talk about the importance of family values," said Rodriguez. "But America isn't a country of family values; Mexico is a country of family values. This is a country of people who leave home."

While the book received widespread critical acclaim and won several literary awards, it also stirred controversy at college campuses by the mid-1990s because of Rodriguez's strong stands against bilingual education and affirmative action. Some Mexican Americans called him pocho, Americanized Mexican, accusing him of betraying himself and his people. Others called him a "coconut," brown on the outside, but white on the inside. He calls himself "a comic victim of two cultures."

Rodriguez has worked as a teacher, international journalist, and educational consultant. His work has been published in Mother Jones and Time. He has appeared regularly on the Public Broadcasting Service show, NewsHour. Rodriguez's visual essays, Richard Rodriguez Essays, on "The News Hour with Jim Lehrer" earned Rodriguez a Peabody Award in 1997.

Rodriguez's most recent book, Darling: A Spiritual Autobiography (2013), explores the important symbolism of the desert in Judaism, Islam and Christianity. In an interview before the book came out, Rodriguez reported that he was "interested in the fact that three great monotheistic religions were experienced within this ecology." A sample of the project appeared in Harper's Magazine in January 2008. In his essay, "The God of the Desert: Jerusalem and the Ecology of Monotheism," Rodriguez portrays the desert as a paradoxical temple, its emptiness the requisite for God's elusive presence.

As of 2026, Rodriguez is represented by Georges Borchardt, Inc. in New York City as his literary agent.

== Personal life ==
Rodriguez is gay. He discussed his identity in his book of essays Days of Obligation.

== Awards ==
- Fulbright Fellowship, 1972–1973
- National Endowment for the Humanities fellowship, 1976–1977
- Anisfield-Wolf Book Award, 1983
- Emmy Award, 1992
- Frankel Medal, National Endowment of the Humanities, 1992
- George Foster Peabody Award, 1997
- Commonwealth Club gold medal, 2002
- Melcher Book Award, 2003

== Bibliography ==
=== Books ===
- Hunger of Memory: The Education of Richard Rodriguez (1982)
- Days of Obligation: An Argument With My Mexican Father (1992), finalist for the Pulitzer Prize
- Brown: The Last Discovery of America (2002)
- Darling: A Spiritual Autobiography (2013)

=== Articles ===
- America, May 22, 1982, pp. 403–404
- "Mexico's American Children" Harper's Magazine, July 1986
- "Late Victorians" Harper's Magazine, October 1990
