= Manchild in the Promised Land =

1965 autobiographical novel by Claude Brown

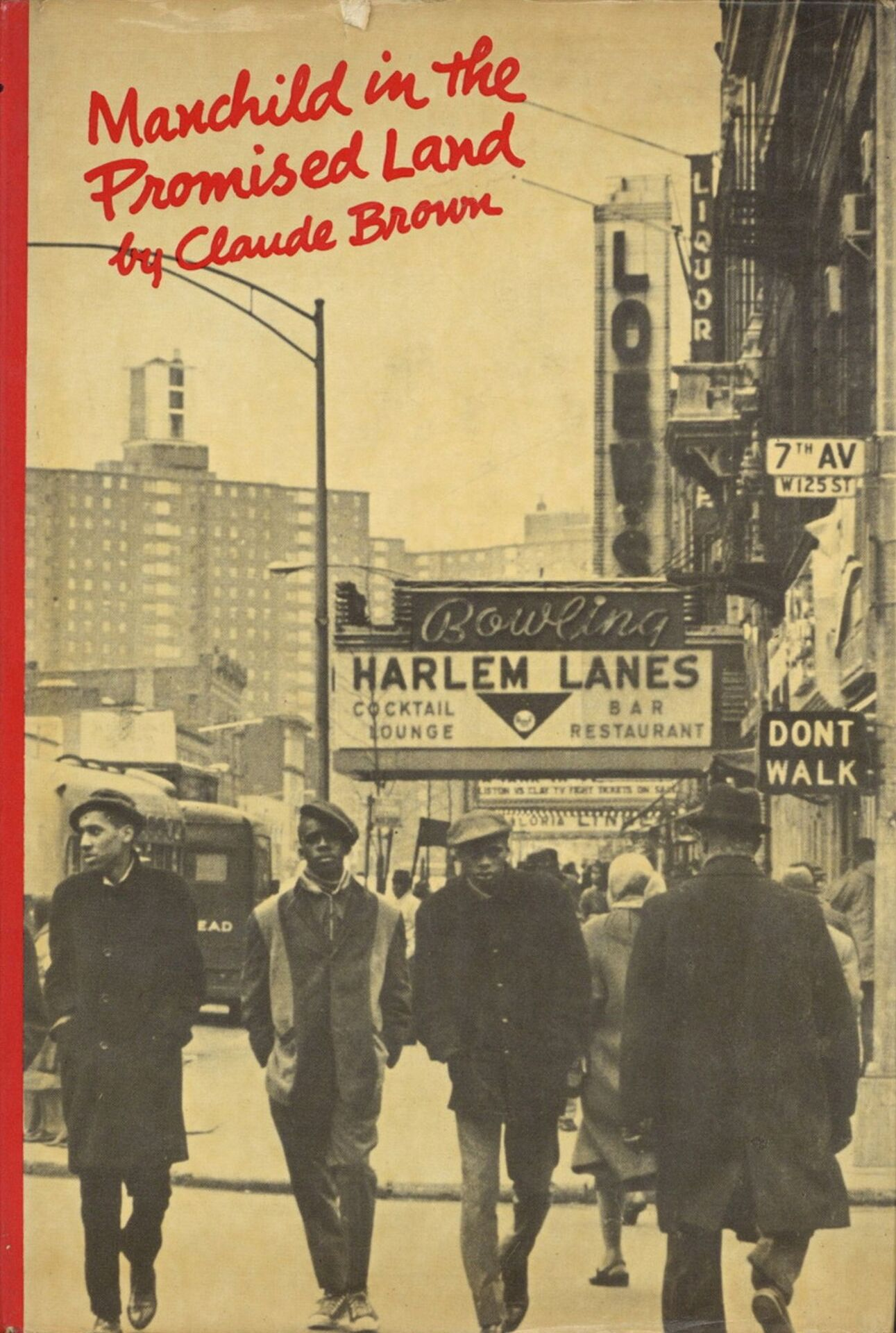
- First edition cover
- Author: Claude Brown
- Language: English
- Genre: Autobiographical novel
- Publisher: Macmillan & Co
- Publication date: 1965
- Publication place: United States
- Media type: Print (hardback & paperback)
- Pages: 415

Manchild in the Promised Land is a 1965 autobiographical novel written by Claude Brown. It chronicles the author's coming-of-age story amidst poverty and violence in Harlem during the 1940s and 1950s. Published at the height of the civil rights movement, the book reached far beyond the traditional literary world, drawing new attention to the lives of those living in urban environments. It has sold more than 4 million copies and has been translated into 14 languages.

== Critical reception ==
The New York Times praised the book, saying that it is "written in brutal and unvarnished honesty in the plain talk of the people, in language that is fierce, uproarious, obscene and tender, but always sensible and direct. And to its enormous credit, this youthful autobiography gives us its devastating portrait of life without one cry of self-pity, outrage or malice, with no caustic sermons or searing rhetoric."

A less favorable review in Commentary said, "In the early, swiftly-moving vignettes of life in Harlem, Brown is attracted by energy, resourcefulness, pride, style, toughness, the lore and the traits of the hipsters who make it to the top in Harlem. This is largely what he talks about. The boy he shows us is proud of the amount of trouble he can get into, and is well aware that most adults have sadly withdrawn from life. He is not so concerned with hardship, then, as with the resources of youthful pride and vitality in the face of it."

The book has appeared on banned book lists for offensive language and violence but is celebrated by critics for its realism.

== See also ==
- 1965 in literature
- List of banned books
