= Abrigo (software company) =

Private financial information company headquartered in Raleigh, North Carolina

Abrigo, Inc.
- Type: Private
- Industry: Banking software; Information technology
- Founded: 1998
- Founders: Daniel Cho - Banker’s Toolbox Brian Hamilton; Sarah Tourville – Sageworks Tom Farin – Farin Financial Risk Management
- Headquarters: Austin, Texas & Raleigh, North Carolina, United States
- Key people: Jay Blandford, CEO
- Website: www.abrigo.com

Abrigo, formerly Sageworks, is a private financial-information company headquartered in Raleigh, North Carolina. Founded in 1998 as Sageworks, Abrigo provides software and services for risk management, financial crime prevention, and lending, serving 2,400 financial institutions. The company focuses on helping banks and credit unions manage regulatory requirements and operational risk while supporting growth amid increasing competition, evolving technologies, and changing customer expectations.

Abrigo offers risk management, compliance, and lending solutions through a combination of software and advisory services, allowing US banks and credit unions to address multiple regulatory and operational needs through a single vendor platform. Abrigo is led by an executive team with experience in financial services, banking technology, and regulatory compliance.

== History ==
=== As Sageworks ===
Abrigo was founded as Sageworks in Raleigh, North Carolina in 1998 by Brian Hamilton and computer programmer Sarah Tourville. The two met while Hamilton was teaching Continuing Studies at Duke University in the early 1990s. Tourville, one of Hamilton's students, said she could program a financial-analysis system after Hamilton said that no one has come up with a way to automate certain analyses. In the late 1990s Hamilton and Tourville spent two years developing software for what was to be known as Sageworks' Financial Information into Narrative Data (FIND), the technology behind its ProfitCents product. While the firm first struggled to market its tools in the early 2000s, CitiBank and Intuit were both early adopters.

Sageworks started collecting financial data 2001. By 2014, it included 2001-2011 data from nearly 240,000 private firms, including three or more consecutive years of financial data for each of 99,040. It provides financial performance data on private companies based on their income statements and balance sheets. (Note: Statement of cash flow data, financial statements' footnote data, and CEO ownership and most other ownership data are not available in Sageworks.) The data is provided by large accounting firms that work with private companies, then anonymized by labeling each company with a unique identifier number. (Note: The accounting firms participating "input data for all their corporate clients directly into Sageworks’ database in an anonymous fashion.") Commercial users are given access to aggregated data by industry and region and not the financials of individual companies. Its data tends to comprise figures from large private firms; as of 2014, it contained data on almost 240,000 private companies. This compares to Sageworks' multi-year data from 2001 to 2011 of 4,360 public U.S. firms. (Note: As derived by Asker et al. from Compustat and CRSP databases, after certain exclusions including removal of all financial firms and regulated utilities.)Commercial users are given access to aggregated data by industry and region and not the financials of individual companies. Its data tends to comprise figures from large private firms; as of 2014, it contained data on almost 240,000 private companies.

In January 2004, the company announced a deal to license to LexisNexis its ProfitCents public product, which turns U.S. Securities and Exchange Commission data from public companies into plain-English text reports.

In 2014, Sageworks launched its LoanSage product, a platform for small business owners to get loans of up to $2 million in one day. That same year, the company unveiled Sageworks Bank Information, a cloud-based platform providing data on banks and credit unions with data of 6,000 U.S. banks and 7,000 credit unions. The same year it launched its CFO platform, a suite of financial analysis tools for financial executives with financial analysis, benchmarking, valuation, and industry data, and Sageworks Bank Information, a cloud-based platform with bank and credit union data.

In November 2016, the company launched a platform that helps lenders provide financing for small and medium-sized businesses. In June 2017, it released its CashSage product, for analyzing cash flow.

=== As Abrigo ===
In 2018, Accel-KKR acquired Sageworks for an undisclosed amount and became part of the Banker's Toolbox suite of products. In 2019, Banker’s Toolbox and Sageworks consolidated under a single brand and rebranded as Abrigo. In 2019, the company acquired Farin Financial Risk Management. In 2021, Abrigo secured a second investment from funds managed by Carlyle. As of the mid-2020s, Abrigo continues to focus on expanding its integrated software platform to help financial institutions adapt to evolving regulatory requirements and scrutiny of their safety. The company has emphasized cloud-based delivery, AI technology, and data-driven insights as key areas of development.

In 2022, Abrigo acquired Valuant and BankLabs’ Construct and +Pay construction-loan administration and funding solutions. DiCOM Software was added in 2023. In 2024, the company acquired TPG Software.

In 2025, Abrigo acquired Integrated Financial Services of Hasbrouck Heights, New Jersey. The company acquired Sioux Falls, South Dakota based Journey Technology Solutions in 2026. The regulatory body for the automated clearing house (ACH) network designated Abrigo as a preferred partner for ACH fraud prevention. In July 2026, Abrigo vice president David Acevedo discussed the company's approach to using customer data and artificial intelligence to support personalized banking relationships.

== Reception ==
Abrigo's data has been used by academics to analyze economics using data from private companies, where traditionally only a very small data-set of about 4,000 public companies that publicly reported their data was available. According to a paper from researchers with New York University and Harvard Business School, Sageworks' data is especially useful, because it is free of survivor bias and other selection biases.

Abrigo also uses data to create the "Sageworks Private Company Indicator", which shows private-company sales growth and profit margins. The firm also occasionally issues aggregate information about average profitability of private firms in various industries. Its research is cited widely in media coverage on tax scam prevention.

=== Awards ===
- Company of the Year – 2025 NC Tech Awards
- Since 2018, Abrigo has been consistently named an Austin American-Statesman Top Workplace and named one of Triangle Business Journal's best places to work
- Named a 2025 Community Champion by the Triangle Business Journal
- Chief Executive Officer, Jay Blandford, was recognized in the 2024 Corporate Leadership Awards by the Triangle Business Journal
- Named 2026 FinTech Company CEO of the Year at the FinTech Breakthrough awards

=== ThinkBig ===
ThinkBIG is an annual conference organized by Abrigo for professionals in the banking and financial services industry. The conference features educational sessions, keynote presentations, and networking opportunities, with programming focused on regulatory compliance, financial crime prevention, lending, portfolio risk management, and financial technology.

=== Philanthropy ===
Abrigo founded a not-for-profit program named Inmates to Entrepreneurs in 2008. The program encourages prison inmates to start their own business. The program is based on Hamilton's small business seminar, focusing on marketing, sales, customer service, accounting, finance and staffing. Participants make informal business plans and are paired with mentors.

The company is also a partner of Texas Advocacy Project's annual “Backpacks for Hope” campaign, which provides backpacks and school supplies to children of domestic abuse survivors displaced from their homes. In addition, several Abrigo employee resource groups organize donation efforts annually for regional food banks, veterans, and the U.S. Marine Corps Reserve's “Toys for Tots” program. Abrigo also supports a number of its customer bank and credit union events in their communities across the United States each year.
