= Claude Brown =

American writer (1937–2002)

- Born: February 23, 1937; New York, New York
- Died: February 2, 2002 (aged 64); New York, New York
- Occupation: Writer
- Notable work: Manchild in the Promised Land

Claude Brown (February 23, 1937 – February 2, 2002) was the author of Manchild in the Promised Land, published to critical acclaim in 1965, which tells the story of his coming of age during the 1940s and 1950s in Harlem. He also published Children of Ham (1976).

== Early life ==
Brown was born on February 23, 1937, in New York, New York. The autobiographical Manchild in the Promised Land describes the cultural, economic, and religious conditions that suffused Harlem during Brown's early childhood and adolescence while constructing a narrative of Brown's tumultuous early life. The book explains that in the early 20th century, New York was thought to be the promised land for African Americans, but life in Harlem was more challenging than migrants expected.

Brown's parents, who had been sharecroppers, moved from South Carolina to Harlem in 1935. They had children and lived in a tenement at 146th Street and Eighth Avenue. Brown had one younger brother and two sisters. From the age of six, his life involved stealing, alcohol consumption, truancy, and gang wars.

These harsh realities of life in 1950s Harlem shaped his childhood. Hoping that a year away from Harlem would benefit him, his parents sent him to live with his grandparents in South Carolina. However, this just made Brown crave the violence of the streets. At the age of 11, he was placed in the Wiltwyck School for Boys, a reform school.

By that time he had made the acquaintance of Dr. Ernest Papanek, a psychologist and the director of the Wiltwyck School for Boys for deprived and emotionally disturbed boys, in Esopus, Ulster County, New York. Dr. Papanek, whom Mr. Brown described in his book as "probably the smartest and the deepest cat I had ever met," encouraged him to seek an education. Although Dr. Papanek pushed him towards getting a better education, Brown still had criminal contacts at Wiltwyck and continued to be involved in street life. Brown had many brushes with the law and had to go to various juvenile detention institutions several times. During one robbery, Brown was shot in the stomach and almost died.

In Brown's mid-teens, he made a living by dealing drugs and becoming a con man. In 1953, he worked in the garment district, but he quit the job after a short time. His younger brother, who he had always thought of as being innocent, became addicted to drugs. In Manchild in the Promised Land, Brown blames his brother's unhealthy lifestyle on not having been exposed to the horrors of Harlem early enough in life.

Acknowledging the damaging effects of drugs such as heroin and gang violence on his community and his friends, Brown decided to leave. He moved away from Harlem, heartbroken at seeing all his friends "strung-out" by drug addiction. After being one of the "hippest cats" (as he says in the book), he moved down to Greenwich Village, where he could start over. For the first time in his life, he decided to get an education and began attending night classes at a high school downtown, supporting himself by working as a busboy and deliveryman and at other odd jobs.

He began to take piano lessons and sold cosmetics as he was trying to make up his mind about college. Many of his old friends were in prison or had moved on from Harlem, so he felt like he no longer had a place in Harlem. A friend had told Brown about Reverend William M. James, who was interested in helping young men from the ghetto get into college. Reverend James tried to help Brown's brother, but his brother was arrested and sent to prison for armed robbery.

Brown graduated in 1965 from Howard University (where his professors included sociologists E. Franklin Frazier and Nathan Hare), and later went on to attend Stanford and Rutgers law schools. He left when the lecture circuit proved more lucrative than law.

== Career ==
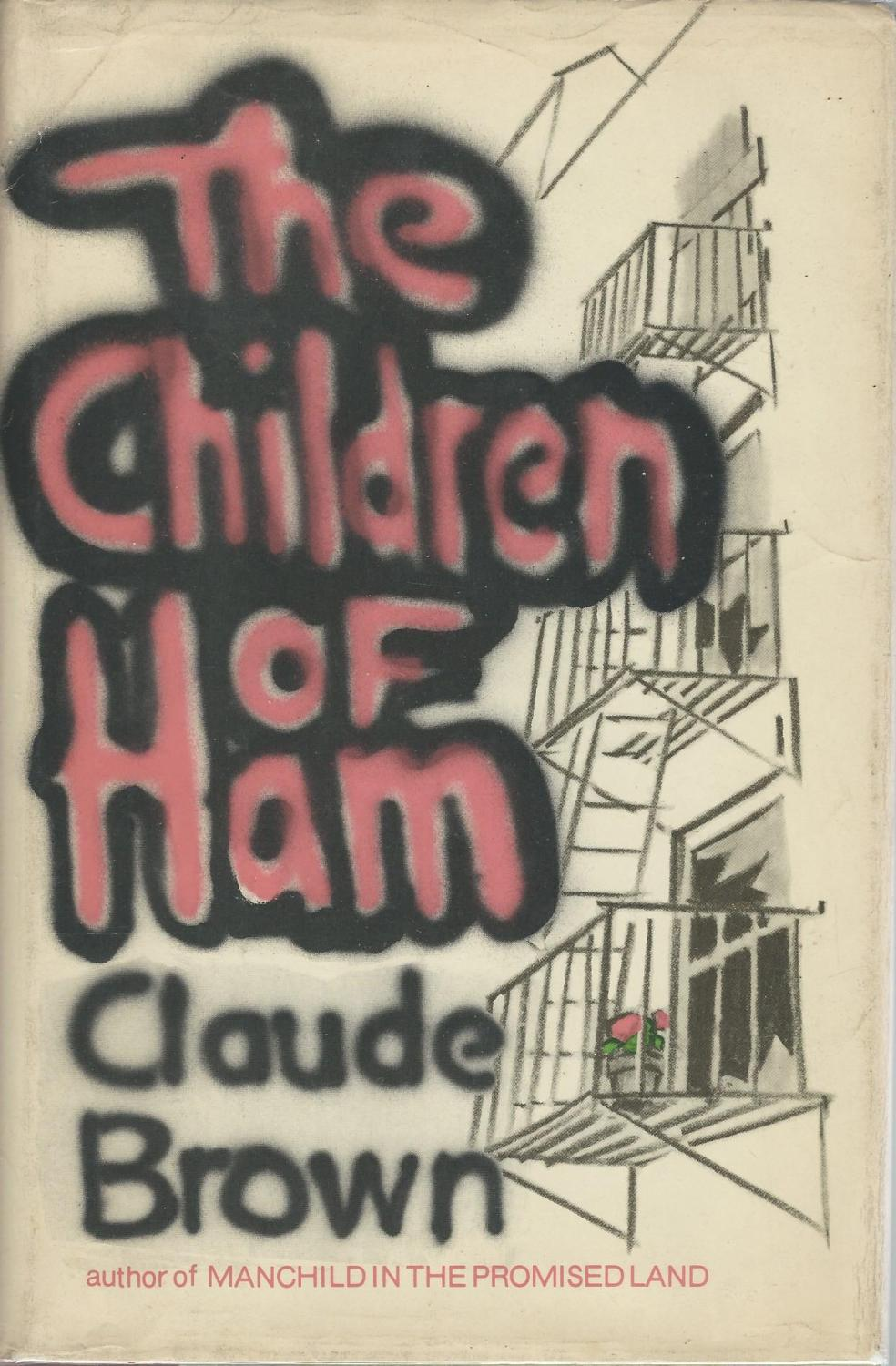
First-edition cover of The Children of Ham.

Manchild in the Promised Land has sold over 4 million copies and has been translated into 14 different languages. As of 2002 it was on the curriculum in many high schools and colleges. The book was banned in certain schools for its use of frank language. In 1971, a complaint in the Chicago Daily Defender asserted that the book is "pornographic literature," and had "428 incidents of impure words." The book was banned in 1974 at a high school in Massachusetts because the headmaster found the language "filthy."

Brown published a second book, Children of Ham, which explores the lives of several black teenagers from Harlem who escape the clutches of heroin. In comparison to sales of his first work, it was a failure. He wrote several articles for national magazines, including Esquire and Look. In 1961, Brown's article "Harlem, My Harlem" was published in Dissent.

Claude Brown died on February 2, 2002, in New York, New York.

== See also ==
- African-American literature
- List of African-American writers
