= List of European Boxing Union champions =

The following is a list of European Boxing Union champions. The European Boxing Union (EBU) is a professional boxing governing body that sanctions championship bouts in Europe.

== Heavyweight ==
Last update: 22 December 2025

List of EBU heavyweight champions
| Name | Date of title victory | Successful defences | Nationality |
|---|---|---|---|
| Georges Carpentier | 1 June 1913 | 6 | (France) French |
| Battling Siki | 24 September 1922 | 0 | (Senegal) Senegalese / (France) French |
| Erminio Spalla | 20 May 1923 | 2 | (Italy) Italian |
| Paulino Uzcudun | 18 May 1926 | 0 | (Spain) Spanish |
| Harry Persson | 14 June 1926 | 0 | (Sweden) Swedish |
| Phil Scott | 27 January 1927 | 0 | (United Kingdom) British |
| Paulino Uzcudun | 7 July 1928 | 0 | (Spain) Spanish |
| Pierre Charles | 3 February 1929 | 7 | (Belgium) Belgian |
| Hein Müller | 30 August 1931 | 1 | (Germany) German |
| Pierre Charles | 28 May 1932 | 0 | (Belgium) Belgian |
| Paulino Uzcudun | 13 May 1933 | 0 | (Spain) Spanish |
| Primo Carnera | 22 October 1933 | 0 | (Italy) Italian |
| Pierre Charles | 21 June 1935 | 0 | (Belgium) Belgian |
| Arno Kölblin | 17 March 1937 | 0 | (Germany) German |
| Heinz Lazek | 4 March 1938 | 3 | (Austria) Austrian |
| Adolf Heuser | 17 March 1939 | 0 | (Germany) German |
| Max Schmeling | 2 July 1939 | 0 | (Germany) German |
| Olle Tandberg | 30 May 1943 | 0 | (Sweden) Swedish |
| Karel Sys | 11 November 1943 | 0 | (Belgium) Belgian |
| Bruce Woodcock | 29 July 1946 | 2 | (United Kingdom) British |
| Jo Weidin | 3 June 1950 | 0 | (Austria) Austrian |
| Jack Gardner | 27 March 1951 | 0 | (United Kingdom) British |
| Hein ten Hoff | 23 September 1951 | 0 | (Germany) German |
| Karel Sys | 12 January 1952 | 0 | (Belgium) Belgian |
| Heinz Neuhaus | 9 March 1952 | 4 | (Germany) German |
| Franco Cavicchi | 26 June 1955 | 1 | (Italy) Italian |
| Ingemar Johansson | 30 September 1956 | 2 | (Sweden) Swedish |
| Dick Richardson | 27 March 1960 | 3 | (United Kingdom) British |
| Ingemar Johansson | 17 June 1962 | 0 | (Sweden) Swedish |
| Henry Cooper | 24 February 1964 | 0 | (United Kingdom) British |
| Karl Mildenberger | 17 October 1964 | 6 | (Germany) German |
| Henry Cooper | 18 September 1968 | 1 | (United Kingdom) British |
| Peter Weiland | 6 December 1969 | 0 | (Germany) German |
| Jose Manuel Urtain | 3 April 1970 | 1 | (Spain) Spanish |
| Henry Cooper | 10 November 1970 | 0 | (United Kingdom) British |
| Joe Bugner | 16 March 1971 | 1 | (United Kingdom) British |
| Jack Bodell | 27 September 1971 | 0 | (United Kingdom) British |
| Jose Manuel Urtain | 17 December 1971 | 0 | (Spain) Spanish |
| Juergen Blin | 9 June 1972 | 0 | (Germany) German |
| Joe Bugner | 10 October 1972 | 4 | (United Kingdom) British |
| Richard Dunn | 6 April 1976 | 0 | (United Kingdom) British |
| Joe Bugner | 12 October 1976 | 0 | (United Kingdom) British |
| Jean-Pierre Coopman | 12 March 1977 | 0 | (Belgium) Belgian |
| Lucien Rodriguez | 7 May 1977 | 0 | (France) French |
| Alfredo Evangelista | 9 September 1977 | 4 | (Uruguay) Uruguayan / (Spain) Spanish |
| Lorenzo Zanon | 18 April 1979 | 2 | (Italy) Italian |
| John L. Gardner | 22 April 1980 | 1 | (United Kingdom) British |
| Lucien Rodriguez | 26 November 1981 | 6 | (France) French |
| Steffen Tangstad | 9 November 1984 | 0 | (Norway) Norwegian |
| Anders Eklund | 9 March 1985 | 0 | (Sweden) Swedish |
| Frank Bruno | 1 October 1985 | 0 | (United Kingdom) British |
| Steffen Tangstad | 18 April 1986 | 0 | (Norway) Norwegian |
| Alfredo Evangelista | 8 January 1987 | 0 | (Uruguay) Uruguayan / (Spain) Spanish |
| Anders Eklund | 28 March 1987 | 0 | (Sweden) Swedish |
| Francesco Damiani | 9 October 1987 | 2 | (Italy) Italian |
| Derek Williams | 5 December 1989 | 0 | (United Kingdom) British |
| Jean-Maurice Chanet | 3 February 1990 | 1 | (France) French |
| Lennox Lewis | 31 October 1990 | 3 | (United Kingdom) British |
| Henry Akinwande | 1 May 1993 | 2 | (United Kingdom) British |
| Željko Mavrović | 11 April 1995 | 6 | (Croatia) Croatian |
| Vitali Klitschko | 24 October 1998 | 2 | (Ukraine) Ukrainian |
| Wladimir Klitschko | 25 September 1999 | 1 | (Ukraine) Ukrainian |
| Vitali Klitschko | 25 November 2000 | 0 | (Ukraine) Ukrainian |
| Luan Krasniqi | 5 January 2002 | 0 | (Albania) Albanian |
| Przemysław Saleta | 20 July 2002 | 0 | (Poland) Polish |
| Sinan Şamil Sam | 12 October 2002 | 2 | (Turkey) Turkish |
| Luan Krasniqi | 14 February 2004 | 2 | (Albania) Albanian |
| Paolo Vidoz | 11 June 2005 | 2 | (Italy) Italian |
| Vladimir Virchis | 15 July 2006 | 1 | (Ukraine) Ukrainian |
| Sinan Şamil Sam | 4 July 2008 | 0 | (Turkey) Turkish |
| Matt Skelton | 19 December 2008 | 0 | (United Kingdom) British |
| Albert Sosnowski | 18 December 2009 | 0 | (Poland) Polish |
| Audley Harrison | 9 April 2010 | 0 | (United Kingdom) British |
| Alexander Dimitrenko | 31 July 2010 | 2 | (Ukraine) Ukrainian |
| Robert Helenius | 3 December 2011 | 0 | (Finland) Finnish |
| Kubrat Pulev | 5 May 2012 | 1 | (Bulgaria) Bulgarian |
| Derek Chisora | 21 September 2013 | 0 | (United Kingdom) British |
| Tyson Fury | 29 November 2014 | 0 | (United Kingdom) British |
| Erkan Teper | 17 July 2015 | 0 | (Germany) German |
| Robert Helenius | 20 December 2015 | 0 | (Finland) Finnish |
| Kubrat Pulev | 7 May 2016 | 0 | (Bulgaria) Bulgarian |
| Agit Kabayel | 4 February 2017 | 3 | (Germany) German |
| Joe Joyce | 28 November 2020 | 0 | (United Kingdom) British |
| Agit Kabayel | 4 March 2023 | 0 | (Germany) German |
| Oleksandr Zakhozhyi | 13 April 2024 | 0 | Ukraine |
| Labinot Xhoxhaj | 23 November 2024 | 2 | (Kosovo) Kosovan |

== Cruiserweight ==
Last update: 10 January 2026

List of EBU cruiserweight champions.
| Name | Date of title victory | Successful defences | Nationality |
|---|---|---|---|
| Sammy Reeson | 22 April 1987 | 1 | (United Kingdom) British |
| Angelo Rottoli | 26 May 1989 | 0 | (Italy) Italian |
| Anaclet Wamba | 11 November 1989 | 0 | (France) French |
| Johnny Nelson | 14 December 1990 | 1 | (United Kingdom) British |
| Akim Tafer | 27 February 1992 | 3 | (France) French |
| Massimiliano Duran | 22 June 1993 | 0 | (Italy) Italian |
| Carl Thompson | 2 February 1994 | 1 | (United Kingdom) British |
| Alexander Gurov | 17 January 1995 | 0 | (Ukraine) Ukrainian |
| Patrice Aouissi | 14 March 1995 | 1 | (France) French |
| Alexander Gurov | 24 October 1995 | 0 | (Ukraine) Ukrainian |
| Akim Tafer | 25 May 1996 | 0 | (France) French |
| Johnny Nelson | 22 February 1997 | 1 | (United Kingdom) British |
| Terry Dunstan | 14 February 1998 | 0 | (United Kingdom) British |
| Alexey Ilyin | 27 February 1999 | 0 | (Russia) Russian |
| Torsten May | 27 November 1999 | 0 | (Germany) German |
| Carl Thompson | 13 May 2000 | 1 | (United Kingdom) British |
| Alexander Gurov | 21 April 2001 | 1 | (Ukraine) Ukrainian |
| Pietro Aurino | 5 November 2002 | 2 | (Italy) Italian |
| Vincenzo Cantatore | 27 March 2004 | 1 | (Italy) Italian |
| Alexander Gurov | 27 November 2004 | 0 | (Ukraine) Ukrainian |
| David Haye | 16 December 2005 | 3 | (United Kingdom) British |
| Vincenzo Cantatore | 22 June 2007 | 0 | (Italy) Italian |
| Johny Jensen | 14 December 2007 | 0 | (Denmark) Danish |
| Jean Marc Monrose | 3 May 2008 | 0 | (France) French |
| Marco Huck | 20 September 2008 | 3 | (Germany) German |
| Enzo Maccarinelli | 27 April 2010 | 0 | (United Kingdom) British |
| Alexander Frenkel | 18 September 2010 | 0 | (Germany) German |
| Aleksandr Alekseyev | 4 February 2012 | 1 | (Russia) Russian |
| Mateusz Masternak | 15 December 2012 | 0 | (Poland) Polish |
| Grigory Drozd | 5 October 2013 | 1 | (Russia) Russian |
| Rakhim Chakhkiev | 24 October 2014 | 0 | (Russia) Russian |
| Tony Bellew | 12 December 2015 | 0 | (United Kingdom) British |
| Dmytro Kucher | 10 June 2016 | 0 | (Ukraine) Ukrainian |
| Yves Ngabu | 4 June 2017 | 2 | Belgium |
| Lawrence Okolie | 26 October 2019 | 0 | (United Kingdom) British |
| Tommy McCarthy | 31 October 2020 | 1 | (United Kingdom) British |
| Chris Billam-Smith | 13 November 2021 | 3 | (United Kingdom) British |
| Michał Cieślak | 22 April 2023 | 1 | (Poland) Polish |
| Jack Massey | 15 June 2024 | 0 | (United Kingdom) British |
| Leonardo Mosquea | 14 December 2024 | 0 | (France) French |
| Mateusz Masternak | 4 October 2025 | 0 | (Poland) Polish |
| Viddal Riley | 4 April 2026 | 1 | (United Kingdom) British |

== Light-heavyweight ==
Last update: 23 May 2026

List of EBU light heavyweight champions.
| Name | Date of title victory | Successful defences | Nationality |
|---|---|---|---|
| Georges Carpentier | 12 February 1913 | 0 | (France) French |
| Battling Siki | 24 September 1922 | 0 | (France) French |
| Raymond Bonnel | 1 December 1923 | 0 | (France) French |
| Louis Clement | 27 March 1924 | 1 | (Switzerland) Swiss |
| Herman van 't Hof | 5 January 1926 | 0 | (Netherlands) Dutch |
| Fernand Delarge | 25 July 1926 | 2 | (Belgium) Belgian |
| Max Schmeling | 19 June 1927 | 2 | (Germany) German |
| Michele Bonaglia | 10 February 1929 | 2 | (Italy) Italian |
| Ernst Pistulla | 18 March 1931 | 1 | (Germany) German |
| Adolf Heuser | 25 June 1932 | 0 | (Germany) German |
| John Andersson | 1 April 1933 | 1 | (Sweden) Swedish |
| Martinez de Alfara | 7 February 1934 | 0 | (Spain) Spanish |
| Marcel Thil | 26 March 1934 | 3 | (France) French |
| Merlo Preciso | 9 August 1935 | 0 | (Italy) Italian |
| Heinz Lazek | 17 September 1935 | 2 | (Austria) Austrian |
| Gustave Roth | 1 September 1936 | 5 | (Belgium) Belgian |
| Adolf Heuser | 25 March 1938 | 2 | (Germany) German |
| Luigi Musina | 5 April 1942 | 0 | (Italy) Italian |
| Freddie Mills | 8 September 1947 | 1 | (United Kingdom) British |
| Bruce Woodcock | 2 June 1949 | 0 | (United Kingdom) British |
| Albert Yvel | 9 July 1950 | 1 | (France) French |
| Don Cockell | 27 March 1951 | 1 | (United Kingdom) British |
| Conny Rux | 26 July 1952 | 0 | (Germany) German |
| Jacques Hairabedian | 12 July 1953 | 0 | (France) French |
| Gerhard Hecht | 9 April 1954 | 1 | (Germany) German |
| Willi Hoepner | 11 March 1955 | 0 | (Germany) German |
| Gerhard Hecht | 12 July 1955 | 1 | (Germany) German |
| Artemio Calzavara | 12 July 1957 | 0 | (Italy) Italian |
| Willi Hoepner | 30 June 1958 | 0 | (Germany) German |
| Erich Schoppner | 12 December 1958 | 4 | (Germany) German |
| Giulio Rinaldi | 28 September 1962 | 1 | (Italy) Italian |
| Gustav Scholz | 4 April 1964 | 0 | (Germany) German |
| Giulio Rinaldi | 8 July 1965 | 0 | (Italy) Italian |
| Piero Del Papa | 11 March 1966 | 4 | (Italy) Italian |
| Lothar Stengel | 2 December 1967 | 0 | (Germany) German |
| Tom Bogs | 12 September 1968 | 1 | (Denmark) Danish |
| Ivan Prebeg | 28 June 1969 | 0 | (Croatia) Croatian |
| Piero Del Papa | 6 February 1970 | 2 | (Italy) Italian |
| Conny Velensek | 22 January 1971 | 1 | (Germany) German |
| Chris Finnegan | 1 February 1972 | 1 | (United Kingdom) British |
| Rudiger Schmidtke | 14 November 1972 | 0 | (Germany) German |
| John Conteh | 13 March 1973 | 3 | (United Kingdom) British |
| Domenico Adinolfi | 4 December 1974 | 3 | (Italy) Italian |
| Mate Parlov | 10 July 1976 | 3 | (Croatia) Croatian |
| Aldo Traversaro | 26 November 1977 | 3 | (Italy) Italian |
| Rudi Koopmans | 7 March 1979 | 10 | (Netherlands) Dutch |
| Richard Caramanolis | 2 February 1984 | 0 | (France) French |
| Alex Blanchard | 29 May 1984 | 5 | (Netherlands) Dutch |
| Tom Collins | 11 November 1987 | 1 | (United Kingdom) British |
| Pedro van Raamsdonk | 7 September 1988 | 0 | (Netherlands) Dutch |
| Jan Lefeber | 7 November 1988 | 1 | (Netherlands) Dutch |
| Eric Nicoletta | 13 October 1989 | 2 | (France) French |
| Tom Collins | 11 August 1990 | 1 | (United Kingdom) British |
| Graciano Rocchigiani | 28 February 1991 | 1 | (Germany) German |
| Eddy Smulders | 12 May 1993 | 1 | (Netherlands) Dutch |
| Fabrice Tiozzo | 5 March 1994 | 2 | (France) French |
| Eddy Smulders | 6 May 1995 | 3 | (Netherlands) Dutch |
| Crawford Ashley | 1 March 1997 | 1 | (United Kingdom) British |
| Ole Klemetsen | 4 October 1997 | 0 | (Norway) Norwegian |
| Crawford Ashley | 26 September 1998 | 0 | (United Kingdom) British |
| Clinton Woods | 13 March 1999 | 0 | (United Kingdom) British |
| Mohamed Siluvangi | 19 June 1999 | 0 | (France) French |
| Clinton Woods | 12 February 2000 | 1 | (United Kingdom) British |
| Yawe Davis | 6 April 2001 | 1 | (Italy) Italian |
| Thomas Ulrich | 12 October 2002 | 0 | (Germany) German |
| Stipe Drviš | 8 February 2003 | 3 | (Croatia) Croatian |
| Thomas Ulrich | 17 July 2004 | 1 | (Germany) German |
| Stipe Drviš | 7 January 2006 | 1 | (Croatia) Croatian |
| Thomas Ulrich | 13 January 2007 | 1 | (Germany) German |
| Yuri Barashian | 23 February 2008 | 0 | (Ukraine) Ukrainian |
| Jürgen Brähmer | 7 March 2009 | 1 | (Germany) German |
| Nathan Cleverly | 13 February 2010 | 0 | (United Kingdom) British |
| Danny McIntosh | 22 January 2011 | 0 | (United Kingdom) British |
| Eduard Gutknecht | 7 May 2011 | 3 | (Germany) German |
| Jürgen Brähmer | 2 February 2013 | 2 | (Germany) German |
| Igor Mikhalkin | 11 April 2014 | 1 | (Russia) Russian |
| Mehdi Amar | 27 May 2016 | 0 | (France) French |
| Robert Stieglitz | 12 November 2016 | 1 | (Germany) German |
| Karo Murat | 1 July 2017 | 0 | (Germany) German |
| Dominic Boesel | 3 March 2018 | 2 | (Germany) German |
| Mathieu Bauderlique (def. Igor Mikhalkin) | 10 September 2021 | 0 | (France) French |
| Dan Azeez (def. Thomas Faure) | 11 March 2023 | 0 | (France) French |
| Daniel Blenda dos Santos (def. Thomas Faure) | 15 June 2024 | 0 | (United Kingdom) British |
| Bradley Rea (def. Shakan Pitters) | 28 June 2025 | 0 | (United Kingdom) British |
| Lyndon Arthur (def. Bradley Rea) | 1 November 2025 | 0 | (United Kingdom) British |
| Luca D'Ortenzi (def. Robert Parzęczewski) | 22 May 2026 | 0 | (Italy) Italian |

== Super-middleweight ==
Last update: 30 December 2025

List of EBU super middleweight champions.
| Name | Date of title victory | Successful defences | Nationality |
|---|---|---|---|
| Mauro Galvano | 31 March 1990 | 0 | (Italy) Italian |
| James Cook | 10 March 1991 | 2 | (United Kingdom) British |
| Frank Nicotra | 3 April 1992 | 1 | (France) French |
| Vincenzo Nardiello | 16 December 1992 | 0 | (Italy) Italian |
| Ray Close | 17 March 1993 | 0 | (Republic of Ireland) Irish |
| Vincenzo Nardiello | 26 November 1993 | 0 | (Italy) Italian |
| Frederic Seillier | 11 June 1994 | 2 | (France) French |
| Henry Wharton | 8 July 1995 | 2 | (United Kingdom) British |
| Frederic Seillier | 5 July 1996 | 0 | (France) French |
| Andrey Shkalikov | 15 March 1997 | 0 | (Russia) Russian |
| Dean Francis | 19 December 1997 | 0 | (United Kingdom) British |
| Bruno Girard | 10 April 1999 | 1 | (France) French |
| Andrey Shkalikov | 16 September 2000 | 0 | (Russia) Russian |
| Danilo Haussler | 27 January 2001 | 6 | (Germany) German |
| Mads Larsen | 4 October 2003 | 0 | (Denmark) Danish |
| Rudy Markussen | 24 July 2004 | 0 | (Denmark) Danish |
| Vitali Tsypko | 16 July 2005 | 0 | (Ukraine) Ukrainian |
| Jackson Chanet | 18 November 2005 | 0 | (France) French |
| Mger Mkrtchyan | 14 April 2006 | 0 | (Armenia) Armenian |
| David Gogiya | 12 October 2006 | 1 | (Georgia (country)) Georgian |
| Cristian Sanavia | 1 June 2007 | 1 | (Italy) Italian |
| Karo Murat | 12 April 2008 | 2 | (Armenia) Armenian |
| Brian Magee | 30 January 2010 | 1 | (United Kingdom) British |
| Piotr Wilczewski | 4 March 2011 | 0 | (Poland) Polish |
| James DeGale | 15 October 2011 | 2 | (United Kingdom) British |
| Christopher Rebrasse | 22 March 2014 | 0 | (France) French |
| George Groves | 20 September 2014 | 0 | (United Kingdom) British |
| Hadillah Mohoumadi | 29 May 2015 | 1 | (France) French |
| Robin Krasniqi | 2 June 2018 | 1 | (Germany) German |
| Stefan Härtel | 11 May 2019 | 0 | (Germany) German |
| Lerrone Richards | 15 May 2021 | 0 | (United Kingdom) British |
| Kévin Lele Sadjo (def. Jack Cullen) | 18 December 2021 | 2 | (France) French |
| Callum Simpson (def. Ivan Zucco) | 25 June 2025 | 0 | (United Kingdom) British |
| Troy Williamson (def. Callum Simpson) | 20 December 2025 | 0 | (United Kingdom) British |

== Middleweight ==
Last update: 22 August 2026

List of EBU middleweight champions.
| Name | Date of title victory | Successful defences | Nationality |
|---|---|---|---|
| Georges Carpentier | 29 February 1912 | 2 | (France) French |
| Ercole de Balzac | 17 December 1920 | 1 | (France) French |
| Gus Platts | 21 February 1921 | 0 | (United Kingdom) British |
| Johnny Basham | 31 May 1921 | 0 | (United Kingdom) British |
| Ted "Kid" Lewis | 14 October 1921 | 1 | (United Kingdom) British |
| Roland Todd | 15 February 1923 | 0 | (United Kingdom) British |
| Bruno Frattini | 30 November 1924 | 1 | (Italy) Italian |
| Tommy Milligan | 8 June 1925 | 0 | (United Kingdom) British |
| Rene DeVos | 31 January 1926 | 2 | (Belgium) Belgian |
| Tommy Milligan | 12 July 1926 | 2 | (United Kingdom) British |
| Alexander Ireland | 14 March 1928 | 0 | (United Kingdom) British |
| Mario Bosisio | 1 April 1928 | 0 | (Italy) Italian |
| Leone Jacovacci | 24 June 1928 | 1 | (Italy) Italian |
| Marcel Thil | 27 March 1929 | 2 | (France) French |
| Mario Bosisio | 23 November 1930 | 1 | (Italy) Italian |
| Poldi Steinbach | 19 June 1931 | 0 | (Austria) Austrian |
| Hein Domgoergen | 30 August 1931 | 0 | (Germany) German |
| Ignacio Ara | 9 May 1932 | 0 | (Spain) Spanish |
| Gustave Roth | 21 June 1933 | 1 | (Belgium) Belgian |
| Marcel Thil | 3 May 1934 | 3 | (France) French |
| Edouard Tenet | 7 April 1938 | 0 | (France) French |
| Bep van Klaveren | 17 July 1938 | 0 | (Netherlands) Dutch |
| Anton Christoforidis | 14 November 1938 | 0 | (Greece) Greek |
| Edouard Tenet | 10 January 1939 | 0 | (France) French |
| Jupp Besselmann | 23 May 1942 | 1 | (Germany) German |
| Marcel Cerdan | 2 February 1947 | 2 | (France) French |
| Cyrille Delannoit | 23 May 1948 | 0 | (Belgium) Belgian |
| Marcel Cerdan | 10 July 1948 | 0 | (France) French |
| Cyrille Delannoit | 6 November 1948 | 0 | (Belgium) Belgian |
| Tiberio Mitri | 7 May 1949 | 1 | (Italy) Italian |
| Randy Turpin | 27 February 1951 | 1 | (United Kingdom) British |
| Tiberio Mitri | 2 May 1954 | 0 | (Italy) Italian |
| Charles Humez | 13 November 1954 | 3 | (France) French |
| Gustav Scholz | 4 October 1958 | 3 | (Germany) German |
| John McCormack | 17 October 1961 | 1 | (United Kingdom) British |
| Christian Christensen | 8 February 1962 | 0 | (Denmark) Danish |
| László Papp | 16 May 1962 | 6 | (Hungary) Hungarian |
| Nino Benvenuti | 15 October 1965 | 2 | (Italy) Italian |
| Juan Carlo Duran | 17 November 1967 | 4 | (Italy) Italian |
| Tom Bogs | 11 September 1969 | 3 | (Denmark) Danish |
| Juan Carlo Duran | 4 December 1970 | 0 | (Italy) Italian |
| Jean Claude Bouttier | 9 June 1971 | 1 | (France) French |
| Tom Bogs | 18 January 1973 | 0 | (Denmark) Danish |
| Elio Calcabrini | 7 November 1973 | 0 | (Italy) Italian |
| Jean Claude Bouttier | 2 March 1974 | 0 | (France) French |
| Kevin Finnegan | 27 May 1974 | 0 | (United Kingdom) British |
| Gratien Tonna | 7 May 1975 | 0 | (France) French |
| Bunny Sterling | 20 February 1976 | 0 | (United Kingdom) British |
| Angelo Jacopucci | 4 June 1976 | 0 | (Italy) Italian |
| Germano Valsecchi | 1 October 1976 | 1 | (Italy) Italian |
| Alan Minter | 4 February 1977 | 0 | (United Kingdom) British |
| Gratien Tonna | 21 September 1977 | 0 | (France) French |
| Alan Minter | 19 July 1978 | 1 | (United Kingdom) British |
| Kevin Finnegan | 7 February 1980 | 2 | (United Kingdom) British |
| Matteo Salvemini | 10 September 1980 | 0 | (Italy) Italian |
| Tony Sibson | 8 December 1980 | 4 | (United Kingdom) British |
| Louis Acaries | 3 December 1982 | 2 | (France) French |
| Tony Sibson | 25 February 1985 | 1 | (United Kingdom) British |
| Ayub Kalule | 20 June 1985 | 1 | (Uganda) Ugandan |
| Herol Graham | 5 February 1986 | 1 | (United Kingdom) British |
| Sumbu Kalambay | 26 May 1987 | 0 | (Italy) Italian |
| Pierre Joly | 18 December 1987 | 0 | (France) French |
| Christophe Tiozzo | 18 April 1988 | 2 | (France) French |
| Francesco Dell'Aquila | 31 May 1989 | 1 | (Italy) Italian |
| Sumbu Kalambay | 24 January 1990 | 5 | (Italy) Italian |
| Agostino Cardamone | 23 June 1993 | 4 | (Italy) Italian |
| Richie Woodhall | 22 February 1995 | 2 | (United Kingdom) British |
| Alexander Zaitsev | 29 June 1996 | 0 | (Russia) Russian |
| Hacine Cherifi | 19 October 1996 | 2 | (France) French |
| Agostino Cardamone | 24 April 1998 | 0 | (Italy) Italian |
| Erland Betare | 23 January 1999 | 2 | (France) French |
| Howard Eastman | 10 April 2001 | 0 | (United Kingdom) British |
| Cristian Sanavia | 1 December 2001 | 0 | (Italy) Italian |
| Morrade Hakkar | 11 May 1995 | 0 | (France) French |
| Howard Eastman | 28 January 2003 | 3 | (United Kingdom) British |
| Morrade Hakkar | 26 March 2005 | 0 | (France) French |
| Sebastian Sylvester | 16 July 2005 | 2 | (Germany) German |
| Amin Asikainen | 3 June 2006 | 2 | (Finland) Finnish |
| Sebastian Sylvester | 23 June 2007 | 3 | (Germany) German |
| Khoren Gevor | 28 November 2008 | 0 | (Armenia) Armenian |
| Matthew Macklin | 25 September 2009 | 0 | (United Kingdom) British |
| Darren Barker | 9 April 2010 | 0 | (United Kingdom) British |
| Matthew Macklin | 18 September 2010 | 1 | (United Kingdom) British |
| Darren Barker | 30 April 2011 | 0 | (United Kingdom) British |
| Grzegorz Proksa | 1 October 2011 | 0 | (Poland) Polish |
| Kerry Hope | 17 March 2012 | 0 | (United Kingdom) British |
| Grzegorz Proksa | 7 July 2012 | 0 | (Poland) Polish |
| Max Bursak | 2 February 2013 | 1 | (Ukraine) Ukrainian |
| Billy Joe Saunders | 26 July 2014 | 1 | (United Kingdom) British |
| Michel Soro | 20 June 2015 | 0 | (France) French |
| Emanuele Blandamura | 3 December 2016 | 1 | (Italy) Italian |
| Kamil Szeremeta | 23 February 2018 | 2 | (Poland) Polish |
| Matteo Signani | 11 October 2019 | 2 | (Italy) Italian |
| Anderson Prestot | 24 June 2022 | 0 | (France) French |
| Matteo Signani | 18 November 2022 | 0 | (Italy) Italian |
| Tyler Denny | 18 November 2023 | 1 | (United Kingdom) British |
| Hamzah Sheeraz | 21 September 2024 | 0 | (United Kingdom) British |
| Denzel Bentley | 7 December 2024 | 0 | (United Kingdom) British |
| Bilel Jkitou | 6 December 2025 | 0 | (France) French |
| George Liddard | 22 August 2026 | 0 | (United Kingdom) British |

== Super-welterweight ==
Last update: 2 November 2023

List of EBU super welterweight champions
| Name | Date of title victory | Successful defences | Nationality |
|---|---|---|---|
| Bruno Visintin | 22 May 1964 | 5 | (Italy) Italian |
| Bo Hogberg | 1 January 1966 | 0 | (Sweden) Swedish |
| Yoland Leveque | 11 February 1966 | 0 | (France) French |
| Sandro Mazzinghi | 17 June 1966 | 4 | (Italy) Italian |
| Remo Golfarini | 29 November 1968 | 1 | (Italy) Italian |
| Gerhard Piaskowy | 16 July 1969 | 1 | (Germany) German |
| Jose Hernandez | 11 September 1970 | 3 | (Spain) Spanish |
| Juan Carlo Duran | 5 July 1972 | 2 | (Italy) Italian |
| Jacques Kechichian | 4 July 1973 | 1 | (France) French |
| Juan Carlo Duran | 7 June 1974 | 3 | (Italy) Italian |
| Eckhard Dagge | 24 June 1975 | 1 | (Germany) German |
| Vito Antuofermo | 16 January 1976 | 1 | (Italy) Italian |
| Maurice Hope | 1 October 1976 | 2 | (United Kingdom) British |
| Gilbert Cohen | 21 November 1978 | 0 | (France) French |
| Marijan Beneš | 17 March 1979 | 4 | (Socialist Federal Republic of Yugoslavia) Yugoslavian |
| Louis Acaries | 19 March 1981 | 0 | (France) French |
| Luigi Minchillo | 1 July 1981 | 4 | (Italy) Italian |
| Herol Graham | 23 May 1983 | 1 | (United Kingdom) British |
| Jimmy Cable | 25 May 1984 | 0 | (United Kingdom) British |
| Georg Steinherr | 28 September 1984 | 1 | (Germany) German |
| Said Skouma | 30 November 1985 | 2 | (France) French |
| Chris Pyatt | 17 September 1986 | 0 | (United Kingdom) British |
| Gianfranco Rosi | 28 January 1987 | 2 | (Italy) Italian |
| Rene Jacquot | 29 January 1988 | 3 | (France) French |
| Edip Sekowitsch | 11 June 1989 | 0 | (Austria) Austrian |
| Giuseppe Leto | 20 August 1989 | 0 | (Italy) Italian |
| Gilbert Delé | 20 December 1989 | 2 | (France) French |
| Said Skouma | 2 February 1991 | 0 | (France) French |
| Mourad Louati | 3 May 1991 | 0 | (Netherlands) Dutch |
| Jean-Claude Fontana | 14 August 1991 | 1 | (France) French |
| Laurent Boudouani | 29 November 1992 | 2 | (France) French |
| Bernard Razzano | 5 October 1993 | 0 | (France) French |
| Javier Castillejo | 11 January 1994 | 4 | (Spain) Spanish |
| Laurent Boudouani | 3 January 1995 | 2 | (France) French |
| Faouzi Hattab | 28 September 1996 | 0 | (France) French |
| Davide Ciarlante | 20 December 1996 | 2 | (Italy) Italian |
| Javier Castillejo | 2 July 1998 | 0 | (Spain) Spanish |
| Mamadou Thiam | 30 November 1998 | 3 | (Senegal) Senegalese |
| Roman Karmazin | 3 June 2000 | 0 | (Russia) Russian |
| Mamadou Thiam | 29 January 2001 | 1 | (Senegal) Senegalese |
| Wayne Alexander | 19 January 2002 | 0 | (United Kingdom) British |
| Roman Karmazin | 7 February 2003 | 2 | (Russia) Russian |
| Sergiy Dzindziruk | 17 July 2004 | 2 | (Ukraine) Ukrainian |
| Michele Piccirillo | 10 March 2006 | 2 | (Italy) Italian |
| Zaurbek Baysangurov | 7 July 2007 | 2 | (Russia) Russian |
| Jamie Moore | 6 March 2009 | 1 | (United Kingdom) British |
| Ryan Rhodes | 23 October 2009 | 1 | (United Kingdom) British |
| Lukáš Konečný | 18 September 2010 | 2 | (Czech Republic) Czech |
| Sergey Rabchenko | 16 June 2012 | 3 | (Belarus) Belarusian |
| Isaac Real | 17 May 2014 | 0 | (Spain) Spanish |
| Jack Culcay | 16 August 2014 | 1 | (Germany) German |
| Cédric Vitu | 13 June 2015 | 3 | (France) French |
| Zakaria Attou | 22 December 2017 | 0 | (France) French |
| Sergio García | 29 September 2018 | 3 | (Spain) Spanish |
| Kerman Lejarraga | 11 September 2021 | 1 | (Spain) Spanish |
| Milan Prat | 19 November 2022 | 0 | (France) French |

== Welterweight ==
Last update: 2 November 2023

List of EBU welterweight champions.
| Name | Date of title victory | Successful defences | Nationality |
|---|---|---|---|
| Georges Carpentier | 23 October 1911 | 0 | (France) French |
| Albert Badoud | 21 October 1915 | 2 | (Switzerland) Swiss |
| Johnny Basham | 2 September 1919 | 0 | (United Kingdom) British |
| Ted "Kid" Lewis | 9 June 1920 | 1 | (United Kingdom) British |
| Piet Hobin | 25 June 1921 | 1 | (Belgium) Belgian |
| Billy Mack | 23 April 1923 | 0 | (United Kingdom) British |
| Piet Hobin | 6 May 1923 | 2 | (Belgium) Belgian |
| Ted "Kid" Lewis | 3 July 1924 | 0 | (United Kingdom) British |
| Tommy Milligan | 26 November 1924 | 0 | (United Kingdom) British |
| Mario Bosisio | 28 November 1925 | 2 | (Italy) Italian |
| Leo Darton | 10 July 1928 | 0 | (Belgium) Belgian |
| Alf Genon | 26 November 1928 | 3 | (Belgium) Belgian |
| Gustave Roth | 9 October 1929 | 12 | (Belgium) Belgian |
| Adrien Anneet | 26 October 1932 | 1 | (Belgium) Belgian |
| Jack Hood | 22 May 1933 | 0 | (United Kingdom) British |
| Gustav Eder | 8 June 1934 | 8 | (Germany) German |
| Felix Wouters | 23 July 1936 | 4 | (Belgium) Belgian |
| Saverio Turiello | 26 December 1938 | 0 | (Italy) Italian |
| Marcel Cerdan | 3 June 1939 | 2 | (France) French |
| Ernie Roderick | 4 June 1946 | 0 | (United Kingdom) British |
| Robert Villemain | 1 February 1947 | 3 | (France) French |
| Livio Minelli | 4 March 1949 | 1 | (Italy) Italian |
| Michele Palermo | 14 July 1950 | 0 | (Italy) Italian |
| Eddie Thomas | 19 February 1951 | 0 | (United Kingdom) British |
| Charles Humez | 13 June 1951 | 1 | (France) French |
| Gilbert Lavoine | 22 March 1953 | 1 | (France) French |
| Wally Thom | 26 August 1954 | 1 | (United Kingdom) British |
| Idrissa Dione | 23 June 1955 | 1 | (France) French |
| Emilio Marconi | 12 February 1956 | 2 | (Italy) Italian |
| Peter Waterman | 28 January 1958 | 0 | (United Kingdom) British |
| Emilio Marconi | 26 December 1958 | 0 | (Italy) Italian |
| Duilio Loi | 19 April 1959 | 4 | (Italy) Italian |
| Fortunato Manca | 9 October 1964 | 1 | (Italy) Italian |
| Jean Josselin | 25 April 1966 | 0 | (France) French |
| Carmelo Bossi | 17 May 1967 | 2 | (Italy) Italian |
| Edwin Mack | 14 August 1968 | 0 | (Netherlands Antilles) Dutch Antillean |
| Silvano Bertini | 18 January 1969 | 0 | (Italy) Italian |
| Jean Josselin | 5 May 1969 | 0 | (France) French |
| Johann Orsolics | 25 September 1969 | 2 | (Austria) Austrian |
| Ralph Charles | 20 November 1970 | 0 | (United Kingdom) British |
| Roger Menetrey | 4 June 1971 | 5 | (France) French |
| John H. Stracey | 27 May 1974 | 1 | (United Kingdom) British |
| Marco Scano | 9 April 1976 | 1 | (Italy) Italian |
| Jørgen Hansen | 2 June 1977 | 0 | (Denmark) Danish |
| Joerg Eipel | 6 August 1977 | 0 | (Germany) German |
| Alain Marion | 17 December 1977 | 0 | (France) French |
| Jørgen Hansen | 27 April 1978 | 0 | (Denmark) Danish |
| Josef Pachler | 18 August 1978 | 0 | (Austria) Austrian |
| Henry Rhiney | 2 December 1978 | 0 | (Jamaica) Jamaican |
| Dave Boy Green | 23 January 1979 | 0 | (United Kingdom) British |
| Jørgen Hansen | 28 June 1979 | 6 | (Denmark) Danish |
| Hans Henrik Palm | 26 February 1982 | 1 | (Denmark) Danish |
| Colin Jones | 5 November 1982 | 0 | (United Kingdom) British |
| Gilles Elbilia | 10 October 1983 | 1 | (France) French |
| Gianfranco Rosi | 7 July 1984 | 0 | (Italy) Italian |
| Lloyd Honeyghan | 5 January 1985 | 1 | (United Kingdom) British |
| Jose Varela | 10 October 1986 | 0 | (Spain) Spanish |
| Alfonso Redondo | 4 April 1987 | 0 | (Spain) Spanish |
| Mauro Martelli | 25 June 1987 | 4 | (Switzerland) Swiss |
| Nino LaRocca | 15 April 1989 | 1 | (Italy) Italian |
| Antoine Fernandez | 30 December 1989 | 1 | (France) French |
| Kirkland Laing | 9 May 1990 | 0 | (United Kingdom) British |
| Patrizio Oliva | 14 November 1990 | 2 | (Italy) Italian |
| Ludovic Proto | 16 October 1992 | 0 | (France) French |
| Gary Jacobs | 6 February 1993 | 3 | (United Kingdom) British |
| Jose Luis Navarro | 17 December 1994 | 1 | (Spain) Spanish |
| Valery Kayumba | 1 April 1995 | 0 | (France) French |
| Patrick Charpentier | 18 July 1995 | 2 | (France) French |
| Andrey Pestryaev | 15 February 1997 | 0 | (Russia) Russian |
| Michele Piccirillo | 29 November 1997 | 0 | (Italy) Italian |
| Maxim Nesterenko | 15 August 1998 | 1 | (Russia) Russian |
| Alessandro Duran | 24 April 1999 | 0 | (Italy) Italian |
| Andrey Pestryaev | 16 October 1999 | 0 | (Russia) Russian |
| Alessandro Duran | 18 March 2000 | 1 | (Italy) Italian |
| Thomas Damgaard | 3 November 2000 | 0 | (Denmark) Danish |
| Alessandro Duran | 4 May 2001 | 1 | (Italy) Italian |
| Christian Bladt | 18 January 2002 | 0 | (Denmark) Danish |
| Michel Trabant | 20 April 2002 | 2 | (Germany) German |
| Frederic Klose | 19 June 2003 | 1 | (France) French |
| Oktay Urkal | 14 May 2005 | 1 | (Germany) German |
| Frederic Klose | 14 April 2006 | 1 | (France) French |
| Jackson Osei Bonsu | 25 February 2007 | 4 | (Belgium) Belgian |
| Rafał Jackiewicz | 14 September 2008 | 2 | (Poland) Polish |
| Selçuk Aydın | 11 July 2009 | 0 | (Turkey) Turkish |
| Matthew Hatton | 26 March 2010 | 2 | (United Kingdom) British |
| Leonard Bundu | 4 November 2011 | 6 | (Italy) Italian |
| Gianluca Branco | 22 November 2014 | 0 | (Italy) Italian |
| Leonard Bundu | 22 April 2016 | 0 | (Italy) Italian |
| Ceferino Rodríguez | 2 December 2016 | 0 | (Spain) Spanish |
| Sam Eggington | 13 May 2017 | 0 | (United Kingdom) British |
| Mohamed Mimoune | 7 October 2017 | 0 | (France) French |
| Kerman Lejarraga | 28 April 2018 | 1 | (Spain) Spanish |
| David Avanesyan | 30 March 2019 | 5 | (Russia) Russian |
| Jordy Weiss | 31 October 2023 | 0 | (France) French |

== Super-lightweight ==
Last update: 1 July 2025

List of EBU super lightweight champions
| Name | Date of title victory | Successful defences | Nationality |
|---|---|---|---|
| Olli Mäki | 14 February 1964 | 1 | (Finland) Finnish |
| Juan Albornoz | 17 July 1965 | 0 | (Spain) Spanish |
| Willy Quatuor | 26 December 1965 | 1 | (Germany) German |
| Conny Rudhof | 1 February 1967 | 0 | (Germany) German |
| Johann Orsolics | 6 June 1967 | 2 | (Austria) Austrian |
| Bruno Arcari | 7 May 1968 | 4 | (Italy) Italian |
| Rene Roque | 22 April 1970 | 4 | (France) French |
| Pedro Carrasco | 21 May 1971 | 0 | (Spain) Spanish |
| Roger Zami | 28 February 1972 | 0 | (France) French |
| Cemal Kamaci | 1 October 1972 | 0 | (Turkey) Turkish |
| Antonio Ortiz | 13 June 1973 | 1 | (Spain) Spanish |
| Perico Fernandez | 26 July 1974 | 1 | (Spain) Spanish |
| Jose Ramon Gomez Fouz | 8 March 1975 | 1 | (Spain) Spanish |
| Cemal Kamaci | 31 October 1975 | 1 | (Turkey) Turkish |
| Dave Boy Green | 7 December 1976 | 0 | (United Kingdom) British |
| Primo Bandini | 10 August 1977 | 0 | (Italy) Italian |
| Jean-Baptiste Piedvache | 5 December 1977 | 0 | (France) French |
| Colin Powers | 5 June 1978 | 0 | (United Kingdom) British |
| Fernando Sanchez | 9 September 1978 | 1 | (Spain) Spanish |
| Jose Luis Heredia | 3 March 1979 | 0 | (Spain) Spanish |
| Jo Kimpuani | 19 May 1979 | 2 | (France) French |
| Giuseppe Martinese | 27 August 1980 | 0 | (Italy) Italian |
| Antonio Guinaldo | 17 December 1980 | 1 | (Spain) Spanish |
| Clinton McKenzie | 13 October 1981 | 0 | (United Kingdom) British |
| Robert Gambini | 12 October 1982 | 0 | (France) French |
| Patrizio Oliva | 5 January 1983 | 8 | (Italy) Italian |
| Terry Marsh | 24 October 1985 | 2 | (United Kingdom) British |
| Tusikoleta Nkalankete | 6 February 1987 | 3 | (France) French |
| Efrem Calamati | 25 January 1989 | 4 | (Italy) Italian |
| Pat Barrett | 24 August 1990 | 3 | (United Kingdom) British |
| Valery Kayumba | 13 June 1992 | 2 | (France) French |
| Christian Merle | 4 December 1993 | 0 | (France) French |
| Valery Kayumba | 17 April 1994 | 0 | (France) French |
| Khalid Rahilou | 4 June 1994 | 5 | (France) French |
| Søren Søndergaard | 26 April 1996 | 3 | (Denmark) Danish |
| Thomas Damgaard | 27 November 1998 | 2 | (Denmark) Danish |
| Oktay Urkal | 19 February 2000 | 2 | (Germany) German |
| Gianluca Branco | 23 June 2001 | 2 | (Italy) Italian |
| Oktay Urkal | 28 September 2002 | 3 | (Germany) German |
| Junior Witter | 2 June 2004 | 3 | (United Kingdom) British |
| Ted Bami | 22 September 2006 | 1 | (Republic of the Congo) Congolese / (United Kingdom) British |
| Colin Lynes | 20 July 2007 | 1 | (United Kingdom) British |
| Gianluca Branco | 16 May 2008 | 1 | (Italy) Italian |
| Souleymane M'baye | 3 July 2009 | 0 | (France) French |
| Paul McCloskey | 6 November 2009 | 2 | (United Kingdom) British |
| Michele Di Rocco | 8 June 2013 | 4 | (Italy) Italian |
| Rubén Nieto | 5 December 2013 | 1 | (Spain) Spanish |
| Anthony Yigit | 30 September 2017 | 2 | (Sweden) Swedish |
| Joe Hughes | 30 November 2018 | 0 | (United Kingdom) British |
| Robbie Davies Jr | 30 March 2019 | 0 | (United Kingdom) British |
| Sandor Martin | 27 July 2019 | 2 | (Spain) Spanish |
| Enock Poulsen | 21 April 2022 | 0 | (Denmark) Danish |
| Franck Petitjean | 10 June 2023 | 0 | (France) French |
| Adam Azim | 18 November 2023 | 1 | (United Kingdom) British |

== Lightweight ==
Last update: 2 November 2023

List of EBU lightweight champions.
| Name | Date of title victory | Successful defences | Nationality |
|---|---|---|---|
| Freddie Welsh | 23 August 1909 | 2 | (United Kingdom) British |
| Matt Wells | 27 February 1911 | 0 | (United Kingdom) British |
| Freddie Welsh | 11 November 1912 | 2 | (United Kingdom) British |
| Bob Marriott | 10 April 1919 | 0 | (United Kingdom) British |
| Georges Papin | 17 May 1920 | 0 | (France) French |
| Ernie Rice | 9 May 1921 | 0 | (United Kingdom) British |
| Seaman Nobby Hall | 18 September 1922 | 1 | (United Kingdom) British |
| Harry Mason | 21 November 1923 | 0 | (United Kingdom) British |
| Fred Bretonnel | 27 February 1924 | 2 | (France) French |
| Lucien Vinez | 7 October 1924 | 1 | (France) French |
| Harry Mason | 22 June 1925 | 0 | (United Kingdom) British |
| Lucien Vinez | 16 September 1925 | 2 | (France) French |
| Luis Rayo | 3 August 1927 | 1 | (Spain) Spanish |
| Aime Raphael | 22 December 1928 | 1 | (France) French |
| François Sybille | 14 April 1929 | 1 | (Belgium) Belgian |
| Alf Howard | 16 January 1930 | 0 | (United Kingdom) British |
| François Sybille | 18 June 1930 | 1 | (Belgium) Belgian |
| Bep van Klaveren | 19 July 1931 | 3 | (Netherlands) Dutch |
| Cleto Locatelli | 17 July 1932 | 0 | (Italy) Italian |
| François Sybille | 7 December 1932 | 2 | (Belgium) Belgian |
| Cleto Locatelli | 22 October 1933 | 0 | (Italy) Italian |
| François Sybille | 10 February 1934 | 0 | (Belgium) Belgian |
| Carlo Orlandi | 17 March 1934 | 1 | (Italy) Italian |
| Enrico Venturi | 12 October 1935 | 0 | (Italy) Italian |
| Vittorio Tamagnini | 10 October 1936 | 2 | (Italy) Italian |
| Maurice Arnault | 22 April 1937 | 0 | (France) French |
| Gustave Humery | 27 May 1937 | 0 | (France) French |
| Aldo Spoldi | 2 September 1938 | 1 | (Italy) Italian |
| Karl Blaho | 26 October 1940 | 1 | (Austria) Austrian |
| Bruno Bisterzo | 31 May 1941 | 0 | (Italy) Italian |
| Ascenzo Botta | 26 November 1941 | 0 | (Italy) Italian |
| Bruno Bisterzo | 31 December 1941 | 0 | (Italy) Italian |
| Ascenzo Botta | 14 May 1942 | 0 | (Italy) Italian |
| Roberto Proietti | 20 September 1942 | 1 | (Italy) Italian |
| Bruno Bisterzo | 8 May 1943 | 0 | (Italy) Italian |
| Roberto Proietti | 26 May 1946 | 0 | (Italy) Italian |
| Emile Di Cristo | 4 December 1946 | 0 | (France) French |
| Kid Dussart | 29 March 1947 | 0 | (Belgium) Belgian |
| Roberto Proietti | 21 May 1947 | 1 | (Italy) Italian |
| Billy Thompson | 17 February 1948 | 3 | (United Kingdom) British |
| Kid Dussart | 5 July 1949 | 0 | (Belgium) Belgian |
| Roberto Proietti | 17 December 1949 | 2 | (Italy) Italian |
| Pierre Montane | 23 February 1951 | 0 | (France) French |
| Elis Ask | 17 August 1951 | 0 | (Finland) Finnish |
| Jorgen Johansen | 4 January 1952 | 4 | (Denmark) Danish |
| Duilio Loi | 6 February 1954 | 8 | (Italy) Italian |
| Mario Vecchiatto | 24 October 1959 | 0 | (Italy) Italian |
| Dave Charnley | 29 March 1960 | 3 | (United Kingdom) British |
| Conny Rudhof | 29 September 1963 | 0 | (Germany) German |
| Willy Quatuor | 8 May 1964 | 0 | (Germany) German |
| Franco Brondi | 13 March 1965 | 1 | (Italy) Italian |
| Maurice Tavant | 9 October 1965 | 2 | (France) French |
| Borge Krogh | 3 November 1966 | 0 | (Denmark) Danish |
| Pedro Carrasco | 30 June 1967 | 5 | (Spain) Spanish |
| Miguel Velazquez | 29 January 1970 | 3 | (Spain) Spanish |
| Antonio Puddu | 31 July 1971 | 4 | (Italy) Italian |
| Ken Buchanan | 1 May 1974 | 2 | (United Kingdom) British |
| Fernand Roelands | 6 February 1976 | 0 | (Belgium) Belgian |
| Perico Fernandez | 9 July 1976 | 1 | (Spain) Spanish |
| Jim Watt | 5 August 1977 | 3 | (United Kingdom) British |
| Charlie Nash | 27 June 1979 | 1 | (United Kingdom) British |
| Francisco Leon | 1 June 1980 | 0 | (Spain) Spanish |
| Charlie Nash | 14 December 1980 | 0 | (United Kingdom) British |
| Giuseppe Gibilisco | 10 May 1981 | 3 | (Italy) Italian |
| Lucio Cusma | 17 March 1983 | 0 | (Italy) Italian |
| Rene Weller | 29 June 1983 | 0 | (Germany) German |
| Lucio Cusma | 30 September 1983 | 0 | (Italy) Italian |
| Rene Weller | 9 March 1984 | 4 | (Germany) German |
| Gert Bo Jacobsen | 10 January 1986 | 5 | (Denmark) Danish |
| Rene Weller | 5 March 1988 | 0 | (Germany) German |
| Poli Díaz | 30 November 1988 | 7 | (Spain) Spanish |
| Antonio Renzo | 27 April 1991 | 2 | (Italy) Italian |
| Jean Baptiste Mendy | 27 March 1992 | 6 | (France) French |
| Racheed Lawal | 22 April 1994 | 0 | (Denmark) Danish |
| Jean Baptiste Mendy | 4 December 1994 | 1 | (France) French |
| Angel Mona | 18 July 1995 | 2 | (France) French |
| Carlos Fernandes | 15 February 1997 | 0 | (France) French |
| Oscar Garcia Cano | 29 March 1997 | 0 | (Spain) Spanish |
| Billy Schwer | 25 October 1997 | 3 | (United Kingdom) British |
| Oscar Garcia Cano | 15 November 1999 | 0 | (Spain) Spanish |
| Julien Lorcy | 31 January 2000 | 1 | (France) French |
| Stefano Zoff | 26 May 2001 | 2 | (Italy) Italian |
| Jason Cook | 2 August 2002 | 2 | (United Kingdom) British |
| Stefano Zoff | 7 June 2003 | 4 | (Italy) Italian |
| Juan Carlos Diaz Melero | 4 November 2005 | 1 | (Spain) Spanish |
| Yuri Ramanau | 11 November 2006 | 3 | (Belarus) Belarusian |
| Jonathan Thaxton | 4 October 2008 | 0 | (United Kingdom) British |
| Anthony Mezaache | 28 February 2009 | 1 | (France) French |
| John Murray | 7 May 2010 | 2 | (United Kingdom) British |
| Gavin Rees | 4 June 2011 | 3 | (United Kingdom) British |
| Emiliano Marsili | 9 March 2013 | 4 | (Italy) Italian |
| Edis Tatli | 25 April 2015 | 3 | (Finland) Finnish |
| Francesco Patera | 6 May 2017 | 0 | (Belgium) Belgian |
| Edis Tatli | 12 December 2017 | 1 | (Finland) Finnish |
| Francesco Patera | 13 October 2018 | 3 | (Belgium) Belgian |
| Yvan Mendy | 30 April 2022 | 0 | (France) French |
| Denys Berinchyk | 3 December 2022 | 0 | (Ukraine) Ukrainian |
| Sam Noakes | 20 April 2024 | 1 | (United Kingdom) British |

== Super-featherweight ==
Last update: 6 June 2026

List of EBU super featherweight champions.
| Name | Date of title victory | Successful defences | Nationality |
|---|---|---|---|
| Tommaso Galli | 13 January 1971 | 3 | (Italy) Italian |
| Domenico Chiloiro | 16 August 1972 | 0 | (Italy) Italian |
| Lothar Abend | 13 October 1972 | 3 | (Germany) German |
| Svein Erik Paulsen | 7 May 1974 | 4 | (Norway) Norwegian |
| Roland Cazeaux | 27 February 1976 | 1 | (France) French |
| Natale Vezzoli | 24 September 1976 | 8 | (Italy) Italian |
| Carlos Hernandez | 10 March 1979 | 0 | (Spain) Spanish |
| Rodolfo Sanchez | 3 June 1979 | 1 | (Spain) Spanish |
| Carlos Hernandez | 21 December 1979 | 8 | (Spain) Spanish |
| Cornelius Boza-Edwards | 17 March 1982 | 0 | (Uganda) Ugandan |
| Roberto Castanon | 6 November 1982 | 2 | (Spain) Spanish |
| Alfredo Raininger | 21 September 1983 | 1 | (Italy) Italian |
| Jean-Marc Renard | 12 April 1984 | 0 | (Belgium) Belgian |
| Pat Cowdell | 7 July 1984 | 2 | (United Kingdom) British |
| Jean-Marc Renard | 29 January 1986 | 4 | (Belgium) Belgian |
| Salvatore Curcetti | 16 May 1987 | 0 | (Italy) Italian |
| Piero Morello | 17 February 1988 | 1 | (Italy) Italian |
| Lars Lund Jensen | 28 October 1988 | 0 | (Denmark) Danish |
| Racheed Lawal | 8 December 1988 | 2 | (Denmark) Danish |
| Daniel Londas | 9 June 1989 | 5 | (France) French |
| Jimmi Bredahl | 7 March 1992 | 0 | (Denmark) Danish |
| Regilio Tuur | 3 December 1992 | 1 | (Netherlands) Dutch |
| Jacobin Yoma | 11 June 1993 | 4 | (French Guiana) French Guianan |
| Anatoly Alexandrov | 4 July 1995 | 3 | (Kazakhstan) Kazakhstani |
| Julien Lorcy | 2 November 1996 | 0 | (France) French |
| Djamel Lifa | 6 April 1997 | 1 | (France) French |
| Anatoly Alexandrov | 21 February 1998 | 1 | (Kazakhstan) Kazakhstani |
| Dennis Holbaek Pedersen | 18 June 1999 | 0 | (Denmark) Danish |
| Boris Sinitsin | 14 January 2000 | 0 | (Russia) Russian |
| Dennis Holbaek Pedersen | 1 September 2000 | 0 | (Denmark) Danish |
| Tontcho Tontchev | 20 January 2001 | 0 | (Bulgaria) Bulgarian |
| Boris Sinitsin | 15 September 2001 | 1 | (Russia) Russian |
| Pedro Miranda | 2 February 2002 | 0 | (Spain) Spanish |
| Affif Djelti | 6 July 2002 | 2 | (Algeria) Algerian |
| Boris Sinitsin | 4 October 2003 | 3 | (Russia) Russian |
| Alex Arthur | 23 July 2005 | 3 | (United Kingdom) British |
| Levan Kirakosyan | 10 March 2007 | 1 | (Armenia) Armenian |
| Siarhei Guliakevich | 22 December 2007 | 1 | (Belarus) Belarusian |
| Levan Kirakosyan | 19 February 2010 | 1 | (Armenia) Armenian |
| Stephen Foster | 2 October 2010 | 0 | (United Kingdom) British |
| Ermano Fegatilli | 26 February 2011 | 1 | (Belgium) Belgian |
| Devis Boschiero | 21 July 2012 | 3 | (Italy) Italian |
| Romain Jacob | 14 February 2014 | 2 | (France) French |
| Juli Giner | 10 November 2015 | 0 | (Spain) Spanish |
| Guillaume Frenois | 10 November 2016 | 2 | (France) French |
| Martin Joseph Ward | 13 December 2017 | 0 | (United Kingdom) British |
| James Tennyson | 5 May 2018 | 0 | (United Kingdom) British |
| Samir Ziani | 2 February 2019 | 2 | (France) French |
| Faroukh Kourbanov | 11 December 2021 | 0 | (Belgium) Belgian |
| Zelfa Barrett | 4 June 2022 | 0 | (United Kingdom) British |
| Juan Felix Gomez | 5 May 2023 | 0 | (Spain) Spanish |
| Ryan Garner | 1 March 2025 | 1 | (United Kingdom) British |
| Josh Padley | 31 January 2026 | 1 | (United Kingdom) British |

== Featherweight ==
Last update: 2 November 2023

List of EBU featherweight champions.
| Name | Date of title victory | Successful defences | Nationality |
|---|---|---|---|
| Joey Smith | 1 April 1911 | 0 | (United Kingdom) British |
| Jean Poesy | 23 June 1911 | 0 | (France) French |
| Jim Driscoll | 3 June 1912 | 1 | (United Kingdom) British |
| Ted "Kid" Lewis | 6 October 1913 | 1 | (United Kingdom) British |
| Louis de Ponthieu | 24 December 1919 | 0 | (France) French |
| Arthur Wyns | 31 May 1920 | 2 | (Belgium) Belgian |
| Billy Matthews | 12 June 1922 | 0 | (United Kingdom) British |
| Eugène Criqui | 7 July 1922 | 3 | (France) French |
| Edouard Mascart | 20 December 1923 | 0 | (France) French |
| Charles Ledoux | 19 February 1924 | 0 | (France) French |
| Henri Hebrans | 8 May 1924 | 0 | (Belgium) Belgian |
| Edouard Mascart | 17 November 1924 | 0 | (France) French |
| Henri Hebrans | 17 December 1924 | 0 | (Belgium) Belgian |
| Antonio Ruiz | 30 October 1925 | 1 | (Spain) Spanish |
| Luigi Quadrini | 7 January 1928 | 1 | (Italy) Italian |
| Knud Larsen | 11 January 1929 | 1 | (Denmark) Danish |
| Jose Girones | 1 December 1929 | 7 | (Spain) Spanish |
| Maurice Holtzer | 26 March 1935 | 4 | (France) French |
| Phil Dolhem | 6 September 1938 | 1 | (Belgium) Belgian |
| Lucian Popescu | 3 June 1939 | 0 | (Romania) Romanian |
| Ernst Weiss | 30 May 1941 | 0 | (Austria) Austrian |
| Gino Bondavalli | 2 July 1941 | 2 | (Italy) Italian |
| Ermano Bonetti | 11 November 1945 | 0 | (Italy) Italian |
| Al Phillips | 27 May 1947 | 0 | (United Kingdom) British |
| Ronnie Clayton | 11 September 1947 | 0 | (United Kingdom) British |
| Ray Famechon | 22 March 1948 | 6 | (France) French |
| Jean Sneyers | 17 October 1953 | 1 | (Belgium) Belgian |
| Ray Famechon | 20 September 1954 | 2 | (France) French |
| Fred Galiana | 3 November 1955 | 1 | (Spain) Spanish |
| Cherif Hamia | 21 January 1957 | 0 | (France) French |
| Sergio Caprari | 18 August 1958 | 0 | (Italy) Italian |
| Gracieux Lamperti | 15 August 1959 | 3 | (France) French |
| Alberto Serti | 19 August 1962 | 0 | (Italy) Italian |
| Howard Winstone | 9 July 1963 | 7 | (United Kingdom) British |
| José Legrá | 22 December 1967 | 0 | (Cuba) Cuban |
| Manuel Calvo | 17 December 1968 | 0 | (Spain) Spanish |
| Tommaso Galli | 20 August 1969 | 1 | (Italy) Italian |
| José Legrá | 26 June 1970 | 5 | (Cuba) Cuban |
| Jose Antonio Jiminez | 12 May 1973 | 2 | (Spain) Spanish |
| Elio Cotena | 12 February 1975 | 4 | (Italy) Italian |
| Pedro Nino Jimenez | 3 December 1976 | 1 | (Spain) Spanish |
| Manuel Masso | 16 September 1977 | 0 | (Spain) Spanish |
| Roberto Castanon | 16 December 1977 | 11 | (Spain) Spanish |
| Salvatore Melluzzo | 22 July 1981 | 1 | (Italy) Italian |
| Pat Cowdell | 30 March 1982 | 1 | (United Kingdom) British |
| Loris Stecca | 7 April 1983 | 1 | (Italy) Italian |
| Barry McGuigan | 16 November 1983 | 3 | (Republic of Ireland) Irish |
| Jim McDonnell | 5 November 1985 | 1 | (United Kingdom) British |
| Valerio Nati | 13 March 1987 | 1 | (Italy) Italian |
| Jean-Marc Renard | 26 June 1988 | 1 | (Belgium) Belgian |
| Paul Hodkinson | 12 April 1989 | 3 | (United Kingdom) British |
| Fabrice Benichou | 25 May 1991 | 3 | (France) French |
| Maurizio Stecca | 18 December 1992 | 0 | (Italy) Italian |
| Herve Jacob | 27 March 1993 | 0 | (France) French |
| Maurizio Stecca | 28 May 1993 | 0 | (Italy) Italian |
| Stéphane Haccoun | 24 September 1993 | 0 | (France) French |
| Stefano Zoff | 22 March 1994 | 0 | (Italy) Italian |
| Mehdi Labdouni | 9 September 1994 | 1 | (Algeria) Algerian |
| Billy Hardy | 28 October 1995 | 3 | (United Kingdom) British |
| Paul Ingle | 26 September 1998 | 0 | (United Kingdom) British |
| Steve Robinson | 30 April 1999 | 2 | (United Kingdom) British |
| István Kovács | 23 June 2000 | 0 | (Hungary) Hungarian |
| Manuel Calvo Jr. | 25 May 2001 | 0 | (Spain) Spanish |
| Cyril Thomas | 21 December 2002 | 2 | (France) French |
| Nicky Cook | 20 March 2004 | 3 | (United Kingdom) British |
| Cyril Thomas | 20 May 2006 | 1 | (France) French |
| Alberto Servidei | 25 May 2007 | 1 | (Italy) Italian |
| Oleh Yefimovych | 8 July 2008 | 4 | (Ukraine) Ukrainian |
| Sofiane Takoucht | 30 August 2010 | 0 | (France) French |
| Alexander Miskirtchian | 30 September 2011 | 2 | (Belgium) Belgian |
| Lee Selby | 1 February 2014 | 0 | (United Kingdom) British |
| Josh Warrington | 4 October 2014 | 0 | (United Kingdom) British |
| Oleg Yefimovych | 5 December 2015 | 0 | (Ukraine) Ukrainian |
| Dennis Ceylan | 15 October 2016 | 1 | (Denmark) Danish |
| Marc Vidal | 21 July 2017 | 1 | (Spain) Spanish |
| Kiko Martínez | 27 October 2018 | 0 | (Spain) Spanish |
| Andoni Gago | 8 June 2019 | 1 | (Spain) Spanish |
| Karim Guerfi | 13 August 2021 | 0 | (France) French |
| Jordan Gill | 27 February 2022 | 0 | (United Kingdom) British |
| Kiko Martínez | 29 October 2022 | 0 | (Spain) Spanish |
| Mauro Forte | 5 May 2023 | 0 | (Italy) Italian |

== Super-bantamweight ==
Last update: 5 December 2025

List of EBU super bantamweight champions.
| Name | Date of title victory | Successful defences | Nationality |
|---|---|---|---|
| Vincenzo Belcastro | 5 April 1995 | 1 | (Italy) Italian |
| Serhiy Devakov | 30 August 1995 | 0 | (Ukraine) Ukrainian |
| Vincenzo Belcastro | 9 October 1995 | 1 | (Italy) Italian |
| Salim Medjkoune | 11 July 1996 | 0 | (France) French |
| Martin Krastev | 29 December 1996 | 0 | (Bulgaria) Bulgarian |
| Spencer Oliver | 20 May 1997 | 3 | (United Kingdom) British |
| Serhiy Devakov | 2 May 1998 | 0 | (Ukraine) Ukrainian |
| Michael Brodie | 17 October 1998 | 5 | (United Kingdom) British |
| Vladislav Antonov | 30 November 2000 | 0 | (Russia) Russian |
| Salim Medjkoune | 6 March 2001 | 2 | (France) French |
| Mahyar Monshipour | 13 July 2002 | 2 | (France) French |
| Esham Pickering | 16 January 2004 | 2 | (United Kingdom) British |
| Michael Hunter | 28 October 2005 | 3 | (United Kingdom) British |
| Bernard Dunne | 11 November 2006 | 2 | (Republic of Ireland) Irish |
| Kiko Martinez | 25 August 2007 | 0 | (Spain) Spanish |
| Rendall Munroe | 7 March 2008 | 5 | (United Kingdom) British |
| Kiko Martinez | 11 September 2010 | 0 | (Spain) Spanish |
| Willie Casey | 6 November 2010 | 0 | (Republic of Ireland) Irish |
| Kiko Martinez | 15 April 2011 | 1 | (Spain) Spanish |
| Carl Frampton | 9 February 2013 | 1 | (United Kingdom) British |
| Kid Galahad | 22 March 2014 | 0 | (United Kingdom) British |
| Gavin McDonnell | 28 March 2015 | 1 | (United Kingdom) British |
| Abigail Medina | 2 December 2016 | 2 | (Spain) Spanish |
| Luca Rigoldi | 17 November 2018 | 2 | (Italy) Italian |
| Gamal Yafai | 17 December 2020 | 0 | (United Kingdom) British |
| Jason Cunningham | 15 May 2021 | 2 | (United Kingdom) British |
| Liam Davies | 19 November 2022 | 3 | (United Kingdom) British |
| Dennis McCann | 27 July 2024 | 0 | (United Kingdom) British |
| Shabaz Masoud | 6 December 2025 | 0 | (United Kingdom) British |

== Bantamweight ==
Last update: 2 November 2023

List of EBU bantamweight champions.
| Name | Date of title victory | Successful defences | Nationality |
|---|---|---|---|
| Joe Bowker | 7 March 1910 | 0 | (United Kingdom) British |
| Digger Stanley | 17 October 1910 | 1 | (United Kingdom) British |
| Charles Ledoux | 23 June 1912 | 5 | (France) French |
| Tommy Noble | 10 April 1919 | 2 | (United Kingdom) British |
| Charles Ledoux | 31 July 1919 | 3 | (France) French |
| Tommy Harrison | 24 October 1921 | 0 | (United Kingdom) British |
| Charles Ledoux | 24 April 1922 | 4 | (France) French |
| Bugler Harry Lake | 30 July 1923 | 0 | (United Kingdom) British |
| Johnny Brown | 26 November 1923 | 1 | (United Kingdom) British |
| Henri Scillie | 11 May 1925 | 3 | (Belgium) Belgian |
| Domenico Bernasconi | 10 March 1929 | 1 | (Italy) Italian |
| Carlos Flix | 26 September 1929 | 1 | (Spain) Spanish |
| Lucian Popescu | 19 September 1931 | 0 | (Romania) Romanian |
| Domenico Bernasconi | 19 March 1932 | 0 | (Italy) Italian |
| Nicolas Petit-Biquet | 7 December 1932 | 6 | (Belgium) Belgian |
| Maurice Dubois | 11 May 1935 | 1 | (Switzerland) Swiss |
| Joseph Decico | 19 February 1936 | 1 | (France) French |
| Aurel Toma | 26 July 1936 | 0 | (Romania) Romanian |
| Nicolas Petit-Biquet | 3 February 1937 | 0 | (Belgium) Belgian |
| Aurel Toma | 4 June 1938 | 0 | (Romania) Romanian |
| Ernst Weiss | 11 August 1939 | 0 | (Austria) Austrian |
| Gino Cattaneo | 25 November 1939 | 1 | (Italy) Italian |
| Gino Bondavalli | 27 September 1941 | 1 | (Italy) Italian |
| Jackie Paterson | 19 March 1946 | 1 | (United Kingdom) British |
| Theo Medina | 30 October 1946 | 0 | (France) French |
| Peter Kane | 19 September 1947 | 1 | (United Kingdom) British |
| Guido Ferracin | 20 February 1948 | 1 | (Italy) Italian |
| Luis Perez Romero | 10 August 1949 | 3 | (Spain) Spanish |
| Peter Keenan | 5 September 1951 | 0 | (United Kingdom) British |
| Jean Sneyers | 21 May 1952 | 0 | (Belgium) Belgian |
| Peter Keenan | 17 June 1953 | 0 | (United Kingdom) British |
| John Kelly | 3 October 1953 | 0 | (United Kingdom) British |
| Robert Cohen | 27 February 1954 | 0 | (France) French |
| Mario D'Agata | 29 October 1955 | 1 | (Italy) Italian |
| Piero Rollo | 12 October 1958 | 2 | (Italy) Italian |
| Freddie Gilroy | 3 November 1959 | 1 | (United Kingdom) British |
| Jean Pierre Cossemyns | 27 May 1961 | 1 | (Belgium) Belgian |
| Piero Rollo | 13 April 1962 | 0 | (Italy) Italian |
| Alphonse Halimi | 26 June 1962 | 0 | (France) French |
| Piero Rollo | 28 October 1962 | 0 | (Italy) Italian |
| Mimoun Ben Ali | 19 July 1963 | 0 | (Spain) Spanish |
| Risto Luukkonen | 9 December 1963 | 1 | (Finland) Finnish |
| Mimoun Ben Ali | 4 February 1965 | 0 | (Spain) Spanish |
| Tommaso Galli | 19 August 1965 | 2 | (Italy) Italian |
| Mimoun Ben Ali | 17 June 1966 | 2 | (Spain) Spanish |
| Salvatore Burruni | 10 January 1968 | 2 | (Italy) Italian |
| Franco Zurlo | 17 December 1969 | 3 | (Italy) Italian |
| Alan Rudkin | 16 February 1971 | 0 | (United Kingdom) British |
| Agustin Senin | 10 August 1971 | 2 | (Spain) Spanish |
| Johnny Clark | 17 April 1973 | 1 | (United Kingdom) British |
| Bob Allotey | 4 October 1974 | 0 | (Ghana) Ghanaian |
| Daniel Trioulaire | 9 February 1975 | 3 | (France) French |
| Salvatore Fabrizio | 14 August 1976 | 0 | (Italy) Italian |
| Franco Zurlo | 23 February 1977 | 5 | (Italy) Italian |
| Juan Francisco Rodríguez | 16 September 1978 | 2 | (Spain) Spanish |
| Johnny Owen | 28 February 1980 | 0 | (United Kingdom) British |
| Valerio Nati | 3 December 1980 | 5 | (Italy) Italian |
| Giuseppe Fossati | 28 April 1982 | 3 | (Italy) Italian |
| Walter Giorgetti | 9 June 1983 | 3 | (Italy) Italian |
| Ciro De Leva | 14 November 1984 | 7 | (Italy) Italian |
| Antoine Montero | 27 October 1986 | 0 | (France) French |
| Louis Gomis | 22 May 1987 | 2 | (France) French |
| Fabrice Benichou | 30 January 1988 | 0 | (France) French |
| Vincenzo Belcastro | 13 April 1988 | 5 | (Italy) Italian |
| Thierry Jacob | 30 September 1990 | 2 | (France) French |
| Johnny Bredahl | 14 March 1992 | 0 | (Denmark) Danish |
| Vincenzo Belcastro | 27 January 1993 | 3 | (Italy) Italian |
| Naseem Hamed | 11 May 1994 | 1 | (United Kingdom) British |
| Johnny Armour | 19 April 1995 | 1 | (United Kingdom) British |
| Johnny Bredahl | 31 May 1996 | 4 | (Denmark) Danish |
| Paul Lloyd | 12 December 1998 | 0 | (United Kingdom) British |
| Johnny Bredahl | 4 May 1999 | 1 | (Denmark) Danish |
| Luigi Castiglione | 6 October 2000 | 0 | (Italy) Italian |
| Fabien Guillerme | 12 March 2001 | 0 | (France) French |
| Alexander Yagupov | 12 June 2001 | 0 | (Russia) Russian |
| Spend Abazi | 21 September 2001 | 2 | (Albania) Albanian |
| Noel Wilders | 28 January 2003 | 1 | (United Kingdom) British |
| David Guerault | 10 June 2003 | 0 | (France) French |
| Frederic Patrac | 11 June 2004 | 0 | (France) French |
| Simone Maludrottu | 18 September 2004 | 8 | (Italy) Italian |
| Carmelo Ballone | 21 December 2007 | 1 | (Belgium) Belgian |
| Ian Napa | 17 October 2008 | 0 | (United Kingdom) British |
| Malik Bouziane | 20 March 2009 | 2 | (France) French |
| Jamie McDonnell | 20 March 2010 | 4 | (United Kingdom) British |
| Lee Haskins | 7 July 2012 | 0 | (United Kingdom) British |
| Stephane Jamoye | 14 December 2012 | 1 | (Belgium) Belgian |
| Karim Guerfi | 28 September 2013 | 0 | (France) French |
| Zhanat Zhakiyanov | 26 April 2014 | 0 | (Kazakhstan) Kazakh |
| Lee Haskins | 21 February 2015 | 0 | (United Kingdom) British |
| Ryan Farrag | 30 October 2015 | 0 | (United Kingdom) British |
| Karim Guerfi | 4 June 2016 | 1 | (France) French |
| Georges Ory | 26 October 2018 | 1 | (France) French |
| Karim Guerfi | 23 November 2019 | 0 | (France) French |
| Lee McGregor | 20 March 2021 | 1 | (United Kingdom) British |
| Alessio Lorusso | 14 October 2022 | 0 | (Italy) Italian |
| Thomas Essomba | 20 May 2023 | 0 | (United Kingdom) British |

== Flyweight ==
Last update: 2 May 2026

List of EBU flyweight champions.
| Name | Date of title victory | Successful defences | Nationality |
|---|---|---|---|
| Sid Smith | 11 April 1913 | 0 | (United Kingdom) British |
| Bill Ladbury | 2 June 1913 | 0 | (United Kingdom) British |
| Percy Jones | 26 January 1914 | 1 | (United Kingdom) British |
| Jimmy Wilde | 30 March 1914 | 0 | (United Kingdom) British |
| Joe Symonds | 15 May 1914 | 0 | (United Kingdom) British |
| Tancy Lee | 25 January 1915 | 1 | (United Kingdom) British |
| Jimmy Wilde | 26 June 1916 | 2 | (United Kingdom) British |
| Michel Montreuil | 29 September 1923 | 2 | (France) French |
| Elky Clark | 31 January 1925 | 4 | (United Kingdom) British |
| Johnny Hill | 19 March 1928 | 0 | (United Kingdom) British |
| Emile Pladner | 7 February 1929 | 0 | (France) French |
| Johnny Hill | 21 March 1929 | 0 | (United Kingdom) British |
| Eugene Huat | 20 June 1929 | 0 | (France) French |
| Kid Oliva | 6 March 1930 | 0 | (France) French |
| Lucian Popescu | 7 June 1930 | 1 | (Romania) Romanian |
| Jackie Brown | 4 May 1931 | 3 | (United Kingdom) British |
| Praxille Gydé | 1 November 1932 | 7 | (France) French |
| Kid Davidt | 23 June 1935 | 0 | (Belgium) Belgian |
| Benny Lynch | 16 September 1936 | 0 | (United Kingdom) British |
| Ernst Weiss | 5 October 1936 | 0 | (Austria) Austrian |
| Valentin Angelmann | 12 December 1936 | 1 | (France) French |
| Enrico Urbinati | 5 December 1938 | 4 | (Italy) Italian |
| Raoul DeGryse | 9 October 1946 | 0 | (Belgium) Belgian |
| Maurice Sandeyron | 21 May 1947 | 2 | (France) French |
| Rinty Monaghan | 5 April 1949 | 1 | (United Kingdom) British |
| Terry Allen | 25 April 1950 | 0 | (United Kingdom) British |
| Jean Sneyers | 30 October 1950 | 1 | (Belgium) Belgian |
| Teddy Gardner | 18 February 1952 | 2 | (United Kingdom) British |
| Louis Skena | 13 June 1953 | 1 | (France) French |
| Nazzareno Giannelli | 10 September 1954 | 0 | (Italy) Italian |
| Dai Dower | 8 March 1955 | 0 | (United Kingdom) British |
| Young Martin | 3 October 1955 | 3 | (Spain) Spanish |
| Risto Luukkonen | 4 September 1959 | 0 | (Finland) Finnish |
| Salvatore Burruni | 29 June 1961 | 5 | (Italy) Italian |
| René Libeer | 13 June 1965 | 3 | (France) French |
| Fernando Atzori | 25 January 1967 | 9 | (Italy) Italian |
| Fritz Chervet | 3 March 1972 | 3 | (Switzerland) Swiss |
| Fernando Atzori | 28 June 1973 | 0 | (Italy) Italian |
| Fritz Chervet | 26 December 1973 | 0 | (Switzerland) Swiss |
| Franco Udella | 25 October 1974 | 8 | (Italy) Italian |
| Charlie Magri | 1 May 1979 | 4 | (United Kingdom) British |
| Antoine Montero | 17 June 1983 | 2 | (France) French |
| Charlie Magri | 23 August 1984 | 0 | (United Kingdom) British |
| Franco Cherchi | 27 February 1985 | 1 | (Italy) Italian |
| Charlie Magri | 30 October 1985 | 0 | (United Kingdom) British |
| Duke McKenzie | 20 May 1986 | 2 | (United Kingdom) British |
| Eyüp Can | 16 February 1989 | 1 | (Turkey) Turkish |
| Pat Clinton | 3 August 1990 | 0 | (United Kingdom) British |
| Salvatore Fanni | 23 February 1991 | 4 | (Italy) Italian |
| Robbie Regan | 14 November 1992 | 1 | (United Kingdom) British |
| Luigi Camputaro | 22 September 1993 | 2 | (Italy) Italian |
| Robbie Regan | 19 November 1994 | 0 | (United Kingdom) British |
| Luigi Camputaro | 15 September 1995 | 0 | (Italy) Italian |
| Jesper D. Jensen | 31 May 1996 | 3 | (Denmark) Danish |
| David Guerault | 13 June 1997 | 4 | (France) French |
| Alexander Makhmutov | 3 December 1999 | 0 | (Russia) Russian |
| Damaen Kelly | 12 February 2000 | 1 | (United Kingdom) British |
| Alexander Makhmutov | 9 December 2000 | 4 | (Russia) Russian |
| Mimoun Chent | 1 June 2002 | 0 | (France) French |
| Alexander Makhmutov | 19 May 2003 | 0 | (Russia) Russian |
| Brahim Asloum | 14 November 2003 | 3 | (France) French |
| Iván Pozo | 8 July 2005 | 2 | (Spain) Spanish |
| Andrea Sarritzu | 27 July 2006 | 3 | (Italy) Italian |
| Bernard Inom | 3 May 2008 | 0 | (France) French |
| Iván Pozo | 16 January 2009 | 0 | (Spain) Spanish |
| Andrea Sarritzu | 14 November 2009 | 1 | (Italy) Italian |
| Silviu Olteanu | 9 March 2012 | 2 | (Romania) Romanian |
| Valery Yanchy | 26 April 2014 | 0 | (Belarus) Belarusian |
| Kevin Satchell | 25 October 2014 | 0 | (United Kingdom) British |
| Thomas Masson | 12 September 2015 | 1 | (France) French |
| Vincent Legrand | 12 November 2016 | 0 | (France) French |
| Thomas Masson | 19 May 2017 | 0 | (France) French |
| Vincent Legrand | 28 April 2018 | 0 | (France) French |
| Jay Harris | 1 June 2019 | 0 | (United Kingdom) British |
| Jairo Noriega | 20 May 2022 | 0 | (Spain) Spanish |
| Connor Butler | 9 June 2023 | 0 | (United Kingdom) British |
| Jay Harris | 24 February 2024 | 0 | (United Kingdom) British |
| Jairo Noriega | 28 June 2025 | 0 | (Spain) Spanish |
| Conner Kelsall | 2 May 2026 | 0 | (United Kingdom) British |

== See also ==
- European Boxing Union
- List of European Boxing Union female champions
