= Valery Yanchy =

Belarusian boxer (born 1977)

Valery Yanchy (born 23 June 1977), also spelled Yanchi, is a Belarusian boxer.

Yanchy is the former European Boxing Union flyweight champion.

He also fought for the European Boxing Union bantamweight title, but lost.

== Professional boxing record ==
32 fights	25 wins	5 losses
By knockout	7	2
By decision	18	3
Draws	2	

No.	Result	Record	Opponent	Type	Round, Time	Date	Location	Notes
32	Loss	25–5–2	(France) Vincent Legrand	UD	12	12 Nov 2016	Salle Damremon, Boulogne-sur-Mer, France	For vacant European flyweight title
31	Win	25–4–2	(Spain) Javier Diaz	PTS	6	4 Dec 2015	Fronton de Riazor, La Coruña, Spain	
30	Win	24–4–2	(Nicaragua) Edwin Tellez	PTS	6	1 May 2015	Fronton de Riazor, La Coruña, Spain	
29	Loss	23–4–2	(England) Kevin Satchell	MD	12	25 Oct 2014	Echo Arena, Liverpool, England	Lost European flyweight title
28	Win	23–3–2	(Italy) Andrea Sarritzu	UD	12	26 Apr 2014	Molinello Play Village, Mazzo di Rho, Italy	Won vacant European flyweight title
27	Draw	22–3–2	(Italy) Andrea Sarritzu	SD	12	26 Oct 2013	Palasport ITC, Tortolì, Italy	For vacant European flyweight title
26	Win	22–3–1	(Romania) Cosmin Paun	TKO	4 (6)	12 Jul 2013	Fronton de Riazor, La Coruña, Spain	
25	Win	21–3–1	(Venezuela) Jose de Jesus Lopez	PTS	6	12 Oct 2012	Fronton de Riazor, La Coruña, Spain	
24	Loss	20–3–1	(Romania) Silviu Olteanu	SD	12	9 Mar 2012	Palacio de los Deportes de Riazor, La Coruña, Spain	For vacant European flyweight title
23	Draw	20–2–1	(Romania) Silviu Olteanu	MD	12	7 Oct 2011	Palacio de los Deportes de Riazor, La Coruña, Spain	For vacant European flyweight title
22	Win	20–2	(Romania) Andrei George Moldoveanu	PTS	6	15 Apr 2011	Fronton de Riazor, La Coruña, Spain	
21	Win	19–2	(Romania) Laurent Ucristinel Balmau	KO	3 (6)	11 Feb 2011	La Coruña, Galicia, Spain	
20	Win	18–2	(Romania) Benone Marcu	PTS	6	6 Aug 2010	La Coruña, Galicia, Spain	
19	Win	17–2	(Romania) Cristian Vulpe	PTS	6	5 Mar 2010	La Coruña, Galicia, Spain	
18	Win	16–2	(Romania) Bogdan Condurache	TKO	3 (6)	6 Nov 2009	Fronton de Riazor, La Coruña, Spain	
17	Win	15–2	(Ukraine) Oleg Mustafini	TKO	3 (8)	2 Oct 2009	Fronton de Riazor, La Coruña, Spain	
16	Win	14–2	(Romania) Daniel Enache	PTS	4	3 Apr 2009	Fronton de Riazor, La Coruña, Spain	
15	Win	13–2	(Romania) Cristian Niculae	UD	8	29 Aug 2008	Villalba, Galicia, Spain	
14	Win	12–2	(Spain) Julio Vargas	UD	8	16 Aug 2008	Arona, Islas Canarias, Spain	
13	Loss	11–2	(Belgium) Carmelo Ballone	TKO	10 (12)	23 May 2008	La Louvière, Hainaut, Belgium	For EBU (European) bantamweight title
12	Win	11–1	(Romania) Bogdan Condurache	PTS	6	29 Aug 2007	Villalba, Galicia, Spain	
11	Win	10–1	(Spain) Julio Vargas	PTS	6	20 Jul 2007	Ordizia, País Vasco, Spain	
10	Win	9–1	(Belarus) Aliaksandr Kavalenia	TKO	4 (10), 2:08	10 May 2007	Olympic Sport Complex, Minsk, Belarus	Won vacant Belarusian super bantamweight title
9	Win	8–1	(Romania) Florin Alin	TKO	3 (6)	17 Mar 2007	Narón, Galicia, Spain	
8	Loss	7–1	(Norway) Reidar Walstad	RTD	7 (8), 0:01	6 Oct 2006	Hartwall Arena, Helsinki, Finland	Yanchy is stopped owing to broken nose at the beginning of the round 8
7	Win	7–0	(Romania) Constantin Stan	PTS	6	22 Jul 2006	Viveiro, Galicia, Spain	
6	Win	6–0	(Romania) Bogdan Condurache	PTS	6	11 Mar 2006	Narón, Galicia, Spain	
5	Win	5–0	(Portugal) Nelson Lau Fu	UD	6	12 Aug 2005	Lugo, Galicia, Spain	
4	Win	4–0	(Romania) Silviu Olteanu	PTS	4	12 Mar 2005	Narón, Galicia, Spain	
3	Win	3–0	(Romania) Silviu Olteanu	PTS	6	7 Jan 2005	Pabellon Municipal, Lugo, Spain	
2	Win	2–0	(Portugal) Manuel Fatima Dias	TKO	4 (4)	25 Jun 2004	La Coruña, Galicia, Spain	
1	Win	1–0	(Spain) Angel Guillen	PTS	4	21 May 2004	Castelldefels, Cataluña, Spain	
