= Gerhard Hecht =

German boxer

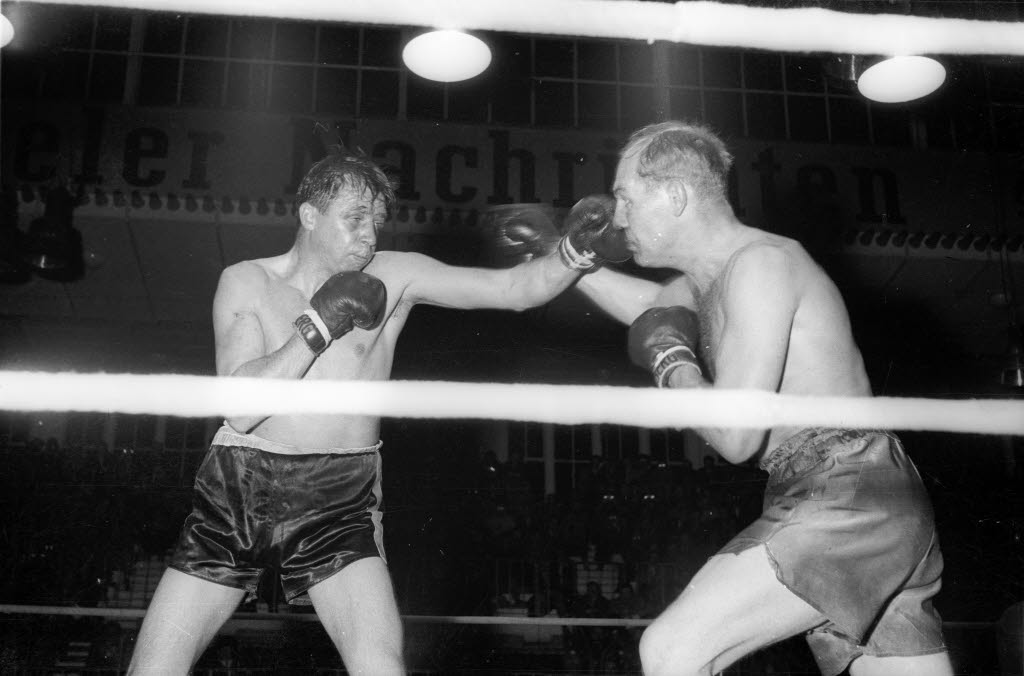
Boxkampf Gerhard Hecht gegen Willi Schagen im Schwergewicht

Gerhard Hecht (March 16, 1923 – February 21, 2005) was a German boxer. Hecht fought against Sugar Ray Robinson in 1951. The fight ended when Robinson hit Hecht in the kidney, and Hecht could not continue. The fight was originally ruled a disqualification victory for Hecht, but later changed to a no-contest.

== Professional boxing record ==
53 Wins (23 knockouts, 30 decisions), 13 Losses (9 knockouts, 4 decisions), 6 Draws, 2 No Contests
Result	Record	Opponent	Type	Round	Date	Location	Notes
Loss	13-5-1	(Germany) Albert Westphal	TKO	6	21/11/1958	(Germany) Ernst Merck Halle, Hamburg	Germany BDB Heavyweight Title.
Loss	22-9-1	(Belgium) Alain Cherville	KO	4	08/03/1958	(Germany) Killesbergpark, Stuttgart, Baden-Württemberg	
Loss	47-8-3	(Germany) Willi Hoepner	PTS	12	20/09/1957	(Germany) Ernst Merck Halle, Hamburg	Germany BDB Light Heavyweight Title.
Loss	30-6-4	(Italy) Artenio Calzavara	PTS	15	12/07/1957	(Italy) Milan, Lombardy	EBU Light Heavyweight Title.
Win	24-12-4	(Netherlands) Willy Schagen	PTS	10	03/05/1957	(Germany) Ostseehalle, Kiel, Schleswig-Holstein	
Win	76-26-1	(United Kingdom) Alex Buxton	PTS	10	26/04/1957	(Germany) Sportpalast, Schoeneberg, Berlin	
Loss	31-3-3	(Trinidad and Tobago) Yolande Pompey	KO	2	25/01/1957	(Germany) Sportpalast, Schoeneberg, Berlin	
Loss	36-6-6	(Germany) Heinz Neuhaus	PTS	12	17/11/1956	(Germany) Westfalenhallen, Dortmund, North Rhine-Westphalia	Germany BDB Heavyweight Title.
Loss	20-5-1	(United Kingdom) Peter Bates	KO	5	04/05/1956	(Germany) Sportpalast, Schoeneberg, Berlin	
Win	38-3-3	(France) Charles Colin	RTD	13	26/02/1956	(France) Saint Nazaire Stadium, Saint-Nazaire, Loire-Atlantique	EBU Light Heavyweight Title.
Win	34-3-6	(Germany) Heinz Neuhaus	PTS	12	06/11/1955	(Germany) Westfalenhallen, Dortmund, North Rhine-Westphalia	Germany BDB Heavyweight Title.
Win	57-21-7	(United States) Henry Hall	PTS	10	16/09/1955	(Germany) Ernst Merck Halle, Hamburg	
Win	44-4-1	(Germany) Willi Hoepner	KO	13	12/06/1955	(Germany) Westfalenhallen, Dortmund, North Rhine-Westphalia	EBU/Germany BDB Light Heavyweight Titles.
Loss	42-4-1	(Germany) Willi Hoepner	TKO	3	11/03/1955	(Germany) Ernst Merck Halle, Hamburg	EBU/Germany BDB Light Heavyweight Titles.
Win	54-9-1	(Canada) Yvon Durelle	UD	10	12/11/1954	(Germany) Sportpalast, Schoeneberg, Berlin	
Win	23-4-1	(Netherlands) Wim Snoek	PTS	15	23/09/1954	(Germany) Ernst Merck Halle, Hamburg	EBU Light Heavyweight Title.
Win	16-26-1	(United States) Art Henri	PTS	8	27/08/1954	(Germany) Sportpalast, Schoeneberg, Berlin	
Win	33-4-3	(France) Jacques Hairabedian	PTS	15	09/04/1954	(Germany) Ernst Merck Halle, Hamburg	EBU Light Heavyweight Title.
Win	14-7-10	(Germany) Guenter Balzer	PTS	8	12/03/1954	(Germany) Stadthalle, Hannover, Lower Saxony	
Loss	53-7-3	(Wales) Johnny Williams	KO	2	22/01/1954	(Germany) Sportpalast, Schoeneberg, Berlin	
Draw	114-14-9	(Belgium) Karel Sys	PTS	10	02/10/1953	(Germany) Sportpalast, Schoeneberg, Berlin	
Win	27-20-2	(United Kingdom) Johnny Barton	PTS	10	07/08/1953	(Germany) Ernst Merck Halle, Hamburg	
Win	59-13-6	(Italy) Fernando Jannilli	PTS	8	05/07/1953	(Germany) Waldbühne, Westend, Berlin	
Win	51-5-5	(Germany) Hans Stretz	KO	10	16/05/1953	(Germany) Sportpalast, Schoeneberg, Berlin	Germany BDB Light Heavyweight Title.
Win	59-12-4	(United Kingdom) Albert Finch	TKO	9	20/03/1953	(Germany) Funkturm Berlin, Westend, Berlin	
Win	3-16-1	(Italy) Gino Menozzi	KO	3	23/01/1953	(Germany) Zeltarena, Hamburg	
Win	25-11-4	(Italy) Renato Tontini	KO	6	16/01/1953	(Germany) Funkturm Berlin, Westend, Berlin	
Win	24-3	(Germany) Willi Hoepner	PTS	12	21/11/1952	(Germany) Funkturm Berlin, Westend, Berlin	Germany BDB Light Heavyweight Title.
Win	22-16-3	(France) Stephane Olek	PTS	8	07/09/1952	(Germany) Waldbühne, Westend, Berlin	
Win	20-6-10	(Germany) Paul Schirrmann	PTS	8	26/07/1952	(Germany) Sportpalast, Schoeneberg, Berlin	
Win	0-7-1	(Belgium) Emile DeGreef	PTS	10	04/07/1952	(Germany) Sportpalast, Schoeneberg, Berlin	
Win	16-5-1	(Germany) Herbert Kleinwachter	PTS	10	11/05/1952	(Germany) Waldbühne, Westend, Berlin	
Win	6-2	(Belgium) Victor d'Haes	PTS	10	04/04/1952	(Germany) Ernst Merck Halle, Hamburg	
Win	58-9-10	(Germany) Hans Strelecki	PTS	8	09/03/1952	(Germany) Westfalenhallen, Dortmund, North Rhine-Westphalia	
Win	7-3-1	(Italy) Giuliano Pancani	PTS	8	23/02/1952	(Germany) Funkturm Berlin, Westend, Berlin	
Loss	19-2	(Germany) Willi Hoepner	PTS	12	02/11/1951	(Germany) Ernst Merck Halle, Hamburg	Germany BDB Light Heavyweight Titles.
Win	3-2	(Belgium) Rik Van Kuyck	KO	1	10/09/1951	(Germany) Ernst Merck Halle, Hamburg	
No Contest	127-1-2	(United States) Sugar Ray Robinson	NC	2	24/06/1951	(Germany) Waldbühne, Westend, Berlin	
Win	30-2	(France) Albert Yvel	TKO	4	29/04/1951	(Germany) Waldbühne, Westend, Berlin	
Win	38-20-2	(Nigeria) Sammy Wilde	PTS	6	16/03/1951	(Germany) Funkturm Berlin, Westend, Berlin	
Win	0-5-1	(Belgium) Eli Elandon	PTS	8	24/02/1951	(Germany) Funkturm Berlin, Westend, Berlin	
Win	13-2-1	(Germany) Herbert Kleinwachter	KO	6	09/02/1951	(Germany) Ernst Merck Halle, Hamburg	
Win	53-25-12	(United States) Don Lee	PTS	8	19/01/1951	(Germany) Messehalle 6 Messegelaende, Westend, Berlin	
No Contest	3-1	(Luxembourg) Jean Serres	NC	6	09/12/1950	(Germany) Funkturm Berlin, Westend, Berlin	
Win	4-1-1	(France) Rene Hauenstein	TKO	2	08/10/1950	(Germany) Waldbühne, Westend, Berlin	
Win	0-1	(France) Marcel Begeot	TKO	6	20/08/1950	(Germany) Waldbühne, Westend, Berlin	
Draw	12-1	(Germany) Herbert Kleinwachter	PTS	12	14/05/1950	(Germany) Waldbühne, Westend, Berlin	Germany BDB Light Heavyweight Title.
Draw	28-0-4	(Germany) Hans Stretz	PTS	12	01/04/1950	(Germany) Funkturm Berlin, Westend, Berlin	Germany BDB Middleweight Title.
Win	23-8-10	(Germany) Willi Fanzlau	PTS	6	25/02/1950	(Germany) Funkturm Berlin, Westend, Berlin	
Draw	30-3-11	(Germany) Heinz Sanger	PTS	6	04/02/1950	(Germany) Funkturm Berlin, Westend, Berlin	
Win	6-19-5	(Germany) Hans Kupsch	PTS	6	19/11/1949	(Germany) Funkturm Berlin, Westend, Berlin	
Win	10-16-6	(Germany) Hermann Vermeulen	PTS	6	17/09/1949	(Germany) Waldbühne, Westend, Berlin	
Win	6-9-18	(Germany) Willy Schier	PTS	8	03/09/1949	(Germany) Mungersdorfer Stadion, Cologne, North Rhine-Westphalia	
Draw	34-12-13	(Germany) Hans Baumann	PTS	6	14/08/1949	(Germany) Waldbühne, Westend, Berlin	
Win	32-2-2	(Germany) Carl Schmidt	KO	3	05/08/1949	(Germany) Planten un Blomen, Hamburg	
Draw	31-2-1	(Germany) Carl Schmidt	PTS	8	03/07/1949	(Germany) Waldbühne, Westend, Berlin	
Win	7-2-1	(Germany) Heinz Titze	KO	4	08/05/1949	(Germany) Waldbühne, Westend, Berlin	
Win	8-5-6	(Germany) Hans Motzelt	PTS	8	29/04/1949	(Germany) Zelt des Zirkus Blumenfeld, Berlin	
Win	17-10-15	(Germany) Richard Zabel	KO	2	09/04/1949	(Germany) Funkturm Berlin, Westend, Berlin	
Win	5-1-2	(Germany) Siegfried Kleimenhagen	TKO	5	05/03/1949	(Germany) Ausstellungshalle, Berlin	
Win	10-4-1	(Germany) Rudolf Oremek	PTS	6	19/02/1949	(Germany) Ausstellungshalle, Berlin	
Win	20-3-5	(Germany) Erich Puhlmann	KO	2	05/02/1949	(Germany) Austellungshalle, Berlin	
Loss	16-0-2	(Germany) Hans Stretz	KO	2	26/12/1948	(Germany) Messehalle, Leipzig, Saxony	
Win	5-5-4	(Germany) Erich Campe	PTS	6	17/10/1948	(Germany) Waldbühne, Westend, Berlin	
Win	2-7-5	(Germany) Heinz Rohde	KO	2	02/10/1948	(Germany) Waldstadion Friedrichshafen, Berlin	
Win	2-5-3	(Germany) Werner Dietrich	KO	1	01/09/1948	(Germany) Messehalle, Leipzig, Saxony	
Win	4-1-4	(Germany) Franz Schmidt	KO	6	01/08/1948	(Germany) Waldbühne, Westend, Berlin	
Loss	3-0	(Germany) Guenter Balzer	KO	1	20/06/1948	(Germany) Olympiastadium, Westend, Berlin	
Win	12-9-5	(Germany) Willi Domagala	KO	2	13/06/1948	(Germany) Messehalle, Leipzig, Saxony	
Loss	4-1	(Germany) Rudolf Oremek	KO	2	08/05/1948	(Germany) Eisstadion, Cologne, North Rhine-Westphalia	
Win	2-1-2	(Germany) Karl Hohne	KO	2	14/03/1948	(Germany) Friedrichstadt Palast, Mitte, Berlin	
Win	10-4-1	(Germany) Willi Franke	KO	1	28/12/1947	(Germany) Thueringenhalle, Erfurt, Thuringia	
Win	--	(Germany) Horst Raspe	TKO	4	14/12/1947	(Germany) Gesellschaftshaus, Sonneberg, Thuringia	
Win	0-1-2	(Germany) Harry Kohler	PTS	4	12/09/1947	(Germany) Reichshallen Garten, Erfurt, Thuringia	
