= Salvatore Burruni =

Italian boxer (1933–2004)

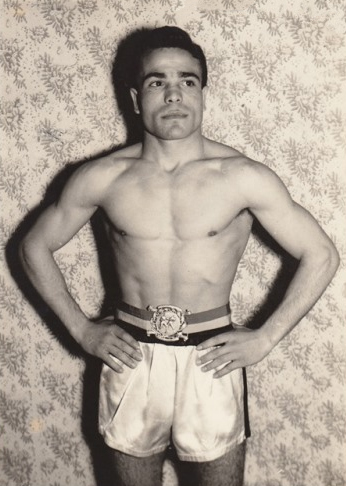

Personal information
- Nationality: Italian
- Born: 11 April 1933 Alghero, Italy
- Died: 30 March 2004 (aged 70) Alghero, Italy
- Height: 1.55 m (5 ft 1 in)
- Weight: Flyweight

Boxing career

Boxing record
- Total fights: 109
- Wins: 99
- Win by KO: 33
- Losses: 9
- Draws: 1
Medal record
Representing Italy
Mediterranean Games
Gold medal – first place	1955 Barcelona	-51 kg

Salvatore Burruni (11 April 1933 – 30 March 2004) was an Italian flyweight and bantamweight boxer who fought between 1957 and 1969. He captured the Undisputed Flyweight Championship in 1965.

== Amateur career ==
Burruni was Italian flyweight champion in 1954 and 1956 and won the World Military Championships in 1955 and 1956 as well as the Mediterranean Games in 1955. At the 1956 Melbourne Olympics he progressed to the second round when he lost to Vladimir Stolnikov.

== Professional career ==
Burruni turned professional in 1958. After successfully campaigning for seven years, during which he won the European Flyweight title, Burruni was given a title shot by WBA, WBC against Lineal flyweight champion Pone Kingpetch from Thailand. On 23 April 1965, Burruni made the most of his opportunity and won a unanimous 15-round decision.

However, in November 1965, WBA & WBC stripped him of the title following his refusal to meet themandatory challenger, Hiroyuki Ebihara.

On 2 December 1965, Burruni successfully defended his lineal crown by knocking out Australian Rocky Gattellari.
On 14 June 1966, he lost to Walter McGowan, whom he had defeated previously.

Unable to make the weight any longer, Burruni moved up to the bantamweight division. He won the European Bantamweight title by taking a 15-round decision from champion Mimoun Ben Ali in 1968. His campaign to secure a World Bantamweight title ended when he was knocked out by Rubén Olivares in 1968. Burruni's final fight took place in 1969, when he defeated Pierre Vetroff by KO.

== Professional boxing record ==
109 fights	99 wins	9 losses
By knockout	33	2
By decision	66	7
Draws	1	

No.	Result	Record	Opponent	Type	Round	Date	Location	Notes
109	Win	99–9–1	Pierre Vetroff	KO	9 (15)	Apr 9, 1969	Reggio Calabria, Calabria, Italy	Retained EBU bantamweight title
108	Win	98–9–1	Wellington Villela	PTS	10	Feb 4, 1969	Taranto, Puglia, Italy	
107	Win	97–9–1	Gerard Macrez	PTS	10	Oct 5, 1968	Oristano, Sardegna, Italy	
106	Win	96–9–1	Franco Zurlo	PTS	15	Jul 31, 1968	San Benedetto del Tronto, Marche, Italy	Retained EBU bantamweight title
105	Win	95–9–1	Billy Brown	PTS	10	Jun 27, 1968	Sassari, Sardegna, Italy	
104	Loss	94–9–1	Rubén Olivares	TKO	3 (10)	Mar 31, 1968	El Toreo de Cuatro Caminos, Mexico City, Distrito Federal, Mexico	
103	Win	94–8–1	Manolin Alvarez	PTS	10	Mar 10, 1968	Padua, Veneto, Italy	
102	Win	93–8–1	Mimoun Ben Ali	PTS	15	Jan 10, 1968	Napoli, Campania, Italy	Won EBU bantamweight title
101	Win	92–8–1	Marc Van Domme	PTS	10	Nov 28, 1967	Sassari, Sardegna, Italy	
100	Win	91–8–1	Felix Alonso	KO	2 (10)	Aug 27, 1967	San Antioco, Sardegna, Italy	
99	Win	90–8–1	Jose Arranz	PTS	10	Jul 29, 1967	Cagliari, Sardegna, Italy	
98	Win	89–8–1	Wellington Villela	PTS	10	Apr 28, 1967	Genoa, Liguria, Italy	
97	Loss	88–8–1	Pierre Vetroff	TKO	6 (10)	Feb 24, 1967	Torino, Piemonte, Italy	
96	Win	88–7–1	Toni Lopez	PTS	8	Feb 11, 1967	Cagliari, Sardegna, Italy	
95	Win	87–7–1	Carl Taylor	KO	5 (10)	Dec 23, 1966	Roma, Lazio, Italy	
94	Win	86–7–1	Spider McNortey	PTS	10	Oct 27, 1966	Sassari, Sardegna, Italy	
93	Win	85–7–1	Felix Alonso	TKO	4 (10)	Sep 25, 1966	Viterbo, Lazio, Italy	
92	Win	84–7–1	Wellington Villela	PTS	10	Aug 16, 1966	Portoscuso, Sardegna, Italy	
91	Loss	83–7–1	Walter McGowan	PTS	15	Jun 14, 1966	Empire Pool, Wembley, London, England, U.K.	Lost The Ring flyweight title
90	Loss	83–6–1	Chartchai Chionoi	UD	10	Feb 8, 1966	Bangkok, Thailand	
89	Win	83–5–1	Ray Jutras	KO	4 (10)	Jan 26, 1966	Palasport, Torino, Piemonte, Italy	
88	Win	82–5–1	Rocky Gattellari	KO	13 (15)	Dec 2, 1965	Sydney Showgrounds, Sydney, New South Wales, Australia	Retained The Ring flyweight title
87	Loss	81–5–1	Katsuyoshi Takayama	UD	10	Oct 7, 1965	Kokugikan, Tokyo, Japan	
86	Loss	81–4–1	Horacio Accavallo	UD	10	Aug 7, 1965	Estadio Luna Park, Buenos Aires, Distrito Federal, Argentina	
85	Win	81–3–1	Michel Lamora	PTS	10	Jul 7, 1965	Rimini, Emilia Romagna, Italy	
84	Win	80–3–1	Jerry Stokes	PTS	10	Jun 28, 1965	Palazzetto dello Sport, Napoli, Campania, Italy	
83	Win	79–3–1	Demetrio Carbajal	TKO	7 (10)	Jun 11, 1965	Roma, Lazio, Italy	
82	Win	78–3–1	Francisco Berdonce	TKO	8 (10)	May 29, 1965	Frosinone, Lazio, Italy	
81	Win	77–3–1	Pone Kingpetch	UD	15	Apr 23, 1965	Palazzetto dello Sport, Roma, Lazio, Italy	Won WBA, WBC, and The Ring flyweight titles
80	Win	76–3–1	Jo Horny	RTD	5 (10)	Mar 18, 1965	Palazzo dello Sport (Pad. 3 Fiera), Milan, Lombardia, Italy	
79	Win	75–3–1	Jose Robledo	PTS	10	Dec 26, 1964	Genoa, Liguria, Italy	
78	Win	74–3–1	Jose Robledo	PTS	10	Dec 12, 1964	Treviso, Veneto, Italy	
77	Win	73–3–1	Antonio Lazaro	RTD	7 (10)	Nov 25, 1964	Palazzetto dello Sport, Bologna, Emilia Romagna, Italy	
76	Win	72–3–1	Francisco Berdonce	PTS	10	Nov 12, 1964	Milan, Lombardia, Italy	
75	Win	71–3–1	Antonio Lazaro	PTS	10	Sep 30, 1964	Terracina, Lazio, Italy	
74	Win	70–3–1	Baby John	PTS	10	Sep 12, 1964	Roma, Lazio, Italy	
73	Win	69–3–1	Rafael Fernández Bernal	PTS	10	Aug 8, 1964	Rimini, Emilia Romagna, Italy	
72	Win	68–3–1	Rafael Fernández Bernal	PTS	10	Jul 19, 1964	Falconara, Marche, Italy	
71	Win	67–3–1	Angel Chinea	KO	3 (10)	Jul 4, 1964	Ceccano, Lazio, Italy	
70	Win	66–3–1	Natalio Jimenez	PTS	10	Jun 26, 1964	Torino, Piemonte, Italy	
69	Win	65–3–1	Antonio Lazaro	PTS	10	Jun 14, 1964	Sassari, Sardegna, Italy	
68	Win	64–3–1	Walter McGowan	PTS	15	Apr 24, 1964	Stadio Olimpico, Roma, Lazio, Italy	Retained EBU flyweight title
67	Win	63–3–1	Brian Cartwright	PTS	10	Feb 21, 1964	Roma, Lazio, Italy	
66	Win	62–3–1	Jean Claude Leroy	TKO	6 (10)	Jan 24, 1964	Napoli, Campania, Italy	
65	Win	61–3–1	Francisco Carreno	PTS	10	Jan 17, 1964	Padua, Veneto, Italy	
64	Win	60–3–1	Alex O'Neill	TKO	5 (10)	Dec 23, 1963	Sassari, Sardegna, Italy	
63	Win	59–3–1	Chilango Gomez	TKO	4 (10)	Dec 13, 1963	Palazzetto dello Sport, Roma, Lazio, Italy	
62	Win	58–3–1	Koli Mustafa	KO	4 (10)	Nov 15, 1963	Sassari, Sardegna, Italy	
61	Win	57–3–1	Luis Rodriguez	TKO	8 (10)	Oct 19, 1963	Torino, Piemonte, Italy	
60	Win	56–3–1	Mick Hussey	TKO	6 (10)	Oct 8, 1963	Palazzetto dello Sport, Roma, Lazio, Italy	
59	Win	55–3–1	Felix Alonso	PTS	10	Sep 14, 1963	Canelli, Piemonte, Italy	
58	Win	54–3–1	Jose Luis Martinez	TKO	6 (10)	Sep 1, 1963	Alghero, Sardegna, Italy	
57	Win	53–3–1	Jacques Jacob	TKO	9 (10)	Aug 18, 1963	Piazza Columbo, San Remo, Liguria, Italy	
56	Win	52–3–1	Baby John	TKO	6 (10)	Aug 3, 1963	Stadio Amsicora, Cagliari, Sardegna, Italy	
55	Win	51–3–1	René Libeer	PTS	15	Jul 5, 1963	Alessandria, Piemonte, Italy	Retained EBU flyweight title
54	Win	50–3–1	Jose Luis Martinez	TKO	7 (10)	Jun 8, 1963	Alessandria, Piemonte, Italy	
53	Win	49–3–1	Jean Leroux	TKO	5 (10)	May 11, 1963	Alghero, Sardegna, Italy	
52	Win	48–3–1	Jose Neves Martins	TKO	9 (10)	Apr 5, 1963	Palazzo Dello Sport, Torino, Piemonte, Italy	
51	Win	47–3–1	Luis Rodriguez	TKO	8 (10)	Mar 21, 1963	Jesolo, Veneto, Italy	
50	Win	46–3–1	Jean Claude Leroy	PTS	10	Feb 22, 1963	Alessandria, Piemonte, Italy	
49	Win	45–3–1	Rafael Fernández Bernal	PTS	10	Jan 26, 1963	Alghero, Sardegna, Italy	
48	Win	44–3–1	Carlos Zayas	PTS	10	Jan 11, 1963	Milan, Lombardia, Italy	
47	Win	43–3–1	Manolin Alvarez	KO	6 (10)	Nov 27, 1962	Torino, Piemonte, Italy	
46	Win	42–3–1	Pierre Rossi	PTS	15	Sep 14, 1962	Velodromo Vigorelli, Milan, Lombardia, Italy	Retained EBU flyweight title
45	Win	41–3–1	Ramon Casal	PTS	10	Aug 4, 1962	Genoa, Liguria, Italy	
44	Win	40–3–1	Rafael Fernández Bernal	PTS	10	Jul 23, 1962	Piscine municipale Felice Scandone, Napoli, Campania, Italy	
43	Win	39–3–1	Mimoun Ben Ali	PTS	15	Jun 30, 1962	Saint-Vincent, Valle d'Aosta, Italy	Retained EBU flyweight title
42	Win	38–3–1	Bernard Jubert	PTS	10	Apr 29, 1962	Velodromo Vigorelli, Milan, Lombardia, Italy	
41	Win	37–3–1	Jean Claude Leroy	PTS	10	Apr 7, 1962	Genoa, Liguria, Italy	
40	Win	36–3–1	Henri Schmid	TKO	5 (10)	Mar 7, 1962	Milan, Lombardia, Italy	
39	Win	35–3–1	Christian Marchand	PTS	10	Dec 20, 1961	Palazzetto dello Sport, Roma, Lazio, Italy	
38	Win	34–3–1	Michel Lamora	PTS	8	Oct 27, 1961	Palazzetto dello Sport, Roma, Lazio, Italy	
37	Win	33–3–1	Albert Younsi	KO	7 (8)	Oct 21, 1961	Palazzo dello Sport (Pad. 3 Fiera), Milan, Lombardia, Italy	
36	Win	32–3–1	Henri Schmid	PTS	10	Sep 30, 1961	Cagliari, Sardegna, Italy	
35	Win	31–3–1	Francisco Carreno	PTS	10	Sep 20, 1961	Roma, Lazio, Italy	
34	Win	30–3–1	Lazaro ben Layachi	TKO	8 (10)	Sep 2, 1961	Cagliari, Sardegna, Italy	
33	Win	29–3–1	Derek Lloyd	TKO	6 (15)	Aug 13, 1961	San Remo, Liguria, Italy	Retained EBU flyweight title
32	Win	28–3–1	Risto Luukkonen	PTS	15	Jun 29, 1961	Alghero, Sardegna, Italy	Won EBU flyweight title
31	Win	27–3–1	Jacques Jacob	PTS	10	Jun 4, 1961	Alghero, Sardegna, Italy	
30	Win	26–3–1	Kamara Diop	PTS	10	Apr 2, 1961	Alghero, Sardegna, Italy	
29	Win	25–3–1	Albert Younsi	PTS	10	Feb 25, 1961	Alghero, Sardegna, Italy	
28	Win	24–3–1	Salvatore Manca	PTS	12	Oct 30, 1960	Cagliari, Sardegna, Italy	Retained Italy flyweight title
27	Win	23–3–1	Edgar Basel	PTS	10	Aug 14, 1960	Sassari, Sardegna, Italy	
26	Win	22–3–1	Pancho Bhattachaji	PTS	8	Aug 6, 1960	Stadio Amsicora, Cagliari, Sardegna, Italy	
25	Win	21–3–1	Angelo Rampin	PTS	12	Jul 10, 1960	Alghero, Sardegna, Italy	
24	Win	20–3–1	Henri Schmid	PTS	10	May 19, 1960	Sassari, Sardegna, Italy	
23	Loss	19–3–1	Albert Younsi	PTS	10	Mar 16, 1960	Teatro Nazionale, Milan, Lombardia, Italy	
22	Win	19–2–1	Giacomo Spano	PTS	12	Dec 23, 1959	Alghero, Sardegna, Italy	Retained Italy flyweight title
21	Win	18–2–1	Jose Sauret	TKO	9 (10)	Sep 26, 1959	Alghero, Sardegna, Italy	
20	Win	17–2–1	Santos Seoane	PTS	10	Aug 29, 1959	Alghero, Sardegna, Italy	
19	Win	16–2–1	Horacio Accavallo	PTS	10	Aug 1, 1959	Sassari, Sardegna, Italy	
18	Win	15–2–1	Salvatore Manca	PTS	12	May 27, 1959	Milan, Lombardia, Italy	Retained Italy flyweight title
17	Win	14–2–1	Francisco Osuna	PTS	10	Apr 18, 1959	Alghero, Sardegna, Italy	
16	Win	13–2–1	Valentino Campagni	PTS	8	Feb 28, 1959	Milan, Lombardia, Italy	
15	Win	12–2–1	Giancarlo Montanari	PTS	6	Jan 31, 1959	Palazzo dello Sport (Pad. 3 Fiera), Milan, Lombardia, Italy	
14	Loss	11–2–1	Horacio Accavallo	PTS	8	Oct 12, 1958	Stadio Amsicora, Cagliari, Sardegna, Italy	
13	Win	11–1–1	Giacomo Spano	PTS	12	Sep 27, 1958	Alghero, Sardegna, Italy	Won vacant Italy flyweight title
12	Win	10–1–1	Stefano Urbani	TKO	8 (8)	Aug 27, 1958	Sassari, Sardegna, Italy	
11	Win	9–1–1	Salvatore Petrangeli	TKO	6 (8)	Jul 5, 1958	Alghero, Sardegna, Italy	
10	Win	8–1–1	Pompeo Cicognani	PTS	6	Apr 27, 1958	Milan, Lombardia, Italy	
9	Win	7–1–1	Giacomo Spano	PTS	8	Mar 1, 1958	Palazzo dello Sport (Pad. 3 Fiera), Milan, Lombardia, Italy	
8	Loss	6–1–1	Aristide Pozzali	PTS	8	Feb 15, 1958	Palazzo dello Sport (Pad. 3 Fiera), Milan, Lombardia, Italy	
7	Win	6–0–1	Elio De Witt	PTS	6	Dec 14, 1957	Alghero, Sardegna, Italy	
6	Win	5–0–1	Angelo Rampin	PTS	6	Oct 10, 1957	Alghero, Sardegna, Italy	
5	Win	4–0–1	Giacomo Spano	PTS	8	Jul 20, 1957	Alghero, Sardegna, Italy	
4	Draw	3–0–1	Giacomo Spano	PTS	6	Jun 26, 1957	Velodromo Vigorelli, Milan, Lombardia, Italy	
3	Win	3–0	Salvatore Petrangeli	PTS	6	May 29, 1957	Velodromo Vigorelli, Milan, Lombardia, Italy	
2	Win	2–0	Luigi Sguaita	PTS	6	Apr 27, 1957	Milan, Lombardia, Italy	
1	Win	1–0	Maurice Sevelle	TKO	4 (6)	Apr 3, 1957	Milan, Lombardia, Italy	

== Titles in boxing ==
=== Major world titles ===
- WBA flyweight champion (112 lbs)
- WBC flyweight champion (112 lbs)

=== The Ring magazine titles ===
- The Ring flyweight champion (112 lbs)

=== Regional/International titles ===
- Italy flyweight champion (112 lbs)
- European flyweight champion (112 lbs)
- European bantamweight champion (118 lbs)

=== Undisputed titles ===
- Undisputed flyweight champion

== See also ==
- List of flyweight boxing champions
- List of WBA world champions
- List of WBC world champions
- List of The Ring world champions
- List of undisputed boxing champions

Sporting positions
World boxing titles
Preceded by Pone Kingpetch	WBA flyweight champion 23 April 1965 – 1 November 1965; Stripped	Vacant Title next held by Horacio Accavallo
Preceded by Pone Kingpetch	WBC flyweight champion 23 April 1965 – 19 November 1965; Stripped	Vacant Title next held by Horacio Accavallo
Preceded by Pone Kingpetch	The Ring flyweight champion 23 April 1965 – 14 June 1966	Succeeded by Walter McGowan
Preceded by Pone Kingpetch	Undisputed flyweight champion 23 April 1965 – 14 June 1966	Vacant Title next held by Horacio Accavallo
