= Armando Santos =

Mexican boxer

Personal information
- Nickname: Cobra
- Born: Armando Santos Marcelo; 25 May 1988 (age 38) Mexico City, Mexico
- Height: 1.65 m (5 ft 5 in)
- Weight: Flyweight

Boxing career
- Reach: 165 cm (65 in)
- Stance: Orthodox

Boxing record
- Total fights: 22
- Wins: 15
- Win by KO: 8
- Losses: 5
- Draws: 1
- No contests: 0

Armando Santos Marcelo (born 25 May 1988) is a Mexican professional boxer who won the NABF flyweight title in 2013.

== Professional career ==
Santos rose to prominence with an initial 7–1 record, mostly fighting in his hometown Mexico City. He then traveled to Tokyo, where he lost by unanimous decision to future WBC and The Ring flyweight champion Toshiyuki Igarashi on 6 November 2010.

His next tough loss came on 17 June 2011, where he lost by UD against Carlos Cuadras, coincidentally a future WBC super flyweight champion himself.

Santos won his next two fights, and subsequently received his first title shot. He knocked Herald Molina out in the second round on 25 May 2013, in León, Guanajuato for the vacant NABF flyweight championship.

He won the minor WBC–USNBC flyweight title three months later in Toluca, when he defeated Roilo Golez by UD.

Santos also captured the IBF International flyweight title in February 2014, after beating the EBU flyweight champion, Silviu Olteanu by majority decision in Mexico City.

== Professional boxing record ==
14 Wins (8 knockouts, 6 decisions), 5 Losses (2 knockouts, 3 decisions), 1 Draws
Res.	Record	Opponent	Type	Rd., Time	Date	Location	Notes
Loss	14–5–1	(Mexico) Cesar Javier Gandara	UD	8	2015-08-21	Plaza 28 de Julio, Playa del Carmen, Mexico	
Loss	14–4–1	(Philippines) Johnriel Casimero	TKO	2 (12)	2014-12-13	Salón Las Palmas, Pesquería, Mexico	
Draw	14–3–1	(Mexico) Javier Franco	PTS	10	2014-08-30	Oasis Hotel Complex, Cancún, Mexico	
Win	14–3	(Romania) Silviu Olteanu	MD	12	2014-02-01	Foro Polanco, Mexico City, Mexico	For vacant IBF International flyweight title
Win	13–3	(Mexico) Juan Jiménez	TKO	2 (8), 2:42	2013-11-30	Deportivo Agustín Ramos Millan, Toluca, Mexico	
Win	12–3	(Philippines) Roilo Golez	UD	12	2013-08-24	Lienzo Charro "Los Tamaulipecos", Reynosa, Mexico	For vacant WBC–USNBC flyweight title
Win	11–3	(Nicaragua) Herald Molina	KO	2 (12), 1:20	2013-05-25	Domo de la Feria, León, Mexico	Won vacant WBC–NABF flyweight title
Win	10–3	(Mexico) Edgar Gonzalez	TKO	3 (8), 2:31	2013-04-06	Unidad Deportiva El Chamizal, Zamora, Mexico	
Win	9–3	(Mexico) Omar Lina	SD	10	2011-11-26	Campo Futbol Colosio, Playa del Carmen, Mexico	
Loss	8–3	(Mexico) Carlos Cuadras	UD	10	2011-06-17	Salón Amapola, Mexico City, Mexico	
Win	8–2	(Mexico) Miguel Angel Chi	UD	8	2011-04-02	Playa Mamita's, Playa del Carmen, Mexico	
Loss	7–2	(Japan) Toshiyuki Igarashi	UD	8	2010-11-06	Korakuen Hall, Tokyo, Japan	
Win	7–1	(Mexico) Miguel Garcia	UD	8	2010-09-17	Centro de Cancún, Cancún, Mexico	
Win	6–1	(Mexico) Angel Aguilar	SD	8	2010-07-10	Auditorio Plaza Condesa, Mexico City, Mexico	
Win	5–1	(Mexico) Jesús Periban	KO	6 (8)	2010-02-10	Auditorio Plaza Condesa, Mexico City, Mexico	
Win	4–1	(Mexico) Felipe Jimenez	TKO	3 (4)	2009-11-04	Auditorio Plaza Condesa, Mexico City, Mexico	
Win	3–1	(Mexico) Geovani Vargas	TKO	1 (4), 0:56	2009-06-27	Arena Texcoco Lecheria, Texcoco, Mexico	
Win	2–1	(Mexico) Cesar Rojas	TKO	2 (4)	2008-04-10	Roots Magic Club, Mexico City, Mexico	
Loss	1–1	(Mexico) Arturo Zamora	TKO	4 (4), 0:39	2007-04-12	Salon 21, Mexico City, Mexico	
Win	1–0	(Mexico) Alan Barron	TKO	2 (4)	2007-03-08	Salon 21, Mexico City, Mexico	
