= Mimoun Ben Ali =

Spanish boxer (1935-2001)

Mimoun Ben Ali (7 July 1935 – 2001) was a Spanish boxer who was three-time European champion belonging to the Bantamweight division and opponent of various Italian boxers, including world and European champions Mario D'Agata, Salvatore Burruni, Piero Rollo, Tommaso Galli, and Franco Zurlo.

== Career ==
He was left-handed and was born in Farkhana and had Spanish citizenship having been born in a territory that, until 1956, was the Spanish Morocco. He fought only thirteen matches as an amateur, obtaining eleven victories and only two defeats.

After his professional debut in Melilla, in 1955, he moved to Barcelona. In 1957 he earned a draw at the home of Aristide Pozzali, who was the former Italian Champion and challenger for the European title in the flyweight class. On 13 September 1958, in Cagliari, he fought against Mario D'Agata, the European Champion in charge and former World Champion of cockweights in a match without the title at stake. D'Agata prevailed on points in ten rounds. He dominated the Spanish rings for several years, winning the national bantamweight title twice, starting in 1960, and defending it four times.

On 30 June 1962, Mimoun Ben Ali moved down a division to face the European flyweight champion Salvatore Burruni. He lost on points in fifteen rounds in the ring in Saint-Vincent. Meanwhile, the bantamweight title had ended up in the hands of Piero Rollo, who, on 19 July 1963, put it up for grabs against Ben Ali. In the Plaza de Toros in Madrid, Mimoun Ben Ali won the European title for the first time on points. The subsequent draw he imposed on his opponent in Sanremo allowed him to keep the European title. Ben Ali lost his title against the Finnish Risto Luukkonen but then regained it on 4 February 1965 against Frenchman Pierre Vetroff, in Barcelona, on points.

On 19 August 1965 at the Teatro Ariston of Sanremo, he lost to the undefeated Tommaso Galli on points, forcing him to give up the European champion title; however, on 17 June 1966, in the Plaza de Toros in Barcelona, Ben Ali inflicted Galli's first defeat and won the European title for the third time. He twice defended his European title, against his compatriot José Arranz and the Briton Alan Rudkin, winning in both cases on points. He then went to Bangkok to face the World Flyweight Champion Chartchai Chionoi, without a title at stake. Chionoi delivered a KO on the fourth shot.

On 10 January 1968, in Naples, he clashed again with the former European and world flyweight champion Salvatore Burruni, who also moved to the higher category. For Ben Ali, there was nothing he could do and, despite his commendable efforts, he lost on points in fifteen rounds. On 17 December 1969, he again tried to win the European Bantumweight title, which had become vacant due to Burruni's retirement from boxing. In the Taurianova ring, he was defeated on points in 15 rounds by Franco Zurlo. After this defeat, he retired from boxing, at the age of 34.
