= Karel Sys =

Belgian boxer

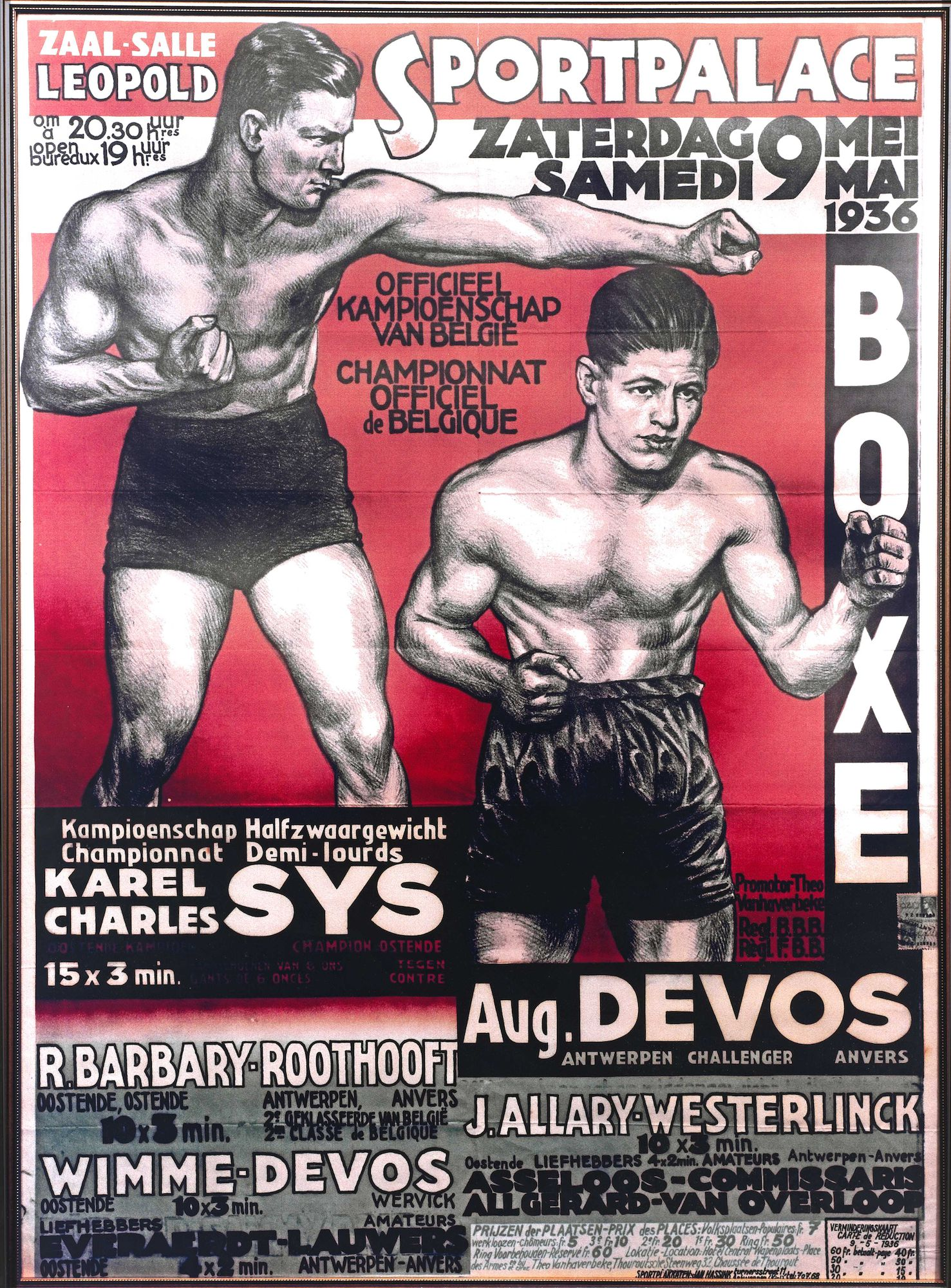
- Poster for a fight of Sys in 9 May 1936

Personal information
- Nationality: Belgian
- Born: 14 February 1914 Ostend, Belgium
- Died: 19 June 1990 (aged 76)
- Height: 1.80 m (5 ft 11 in)
- Weight: Welterweight, middleweight, light heavyweight, Heavyweight

Boxing career
- Stance: Orthodox

Boxing record
- Total fights: 143
- Wins: 117
- Win by KO: 58
- Losses: 15
- Draws: 10

Karel Sys (14 February 1914 – 19 June 1990) was a Belgian boxer who having started his professional career at welterweight went on to become heavyweight champion of Europe on two occasions, winning the title in both 1943 and 1952.

== Career ==
Sys made his professional debut on 1 August 1932 with a points win over Emile Ballister. In January 1933 he beat Ward Meulebrouck to win the East & West Flanders welterweight title. In his first 32 fights he was beaten only twice, by Len Baetens in March 1933 and by Adrien Anneet in March 1935.

In April 1935 he challenged Gustave Roth for the Belgian middleweight title, losing the fight on points.

=== Up in weight ===
He moved up in weight again, and in February 1936 beat Jean Berlemont on a majority decision to become the Belgian light heavyweight champion. He successfully defended the title in May 1936 against Auguste Devos, and in May 1937 against Berlemont. Between the two defences he also recorded wins over Adolf Heuser, Adolf Witt, and Devos.

In December 1937 he faced Roth in Brussels with the latter's IBU European and world light heavyweight titles at stake; The fight ended in a draw, with Roth retaining both titles.

In his first fight of 1938, Sys was beaten by Heuser, but a run of six wins, during which he had moved up again in weight class, led to a challenge in January 1939 for Heinz Lazek's European heavyweight title; Lazek won the fight on points.

=== Regional titles ===
In March 1941, Sys beat Pierre Van Deuren to win the Belgian heavyweight title. He defended it successfully against Roth in July, but lost it to Roth on points in May 1942.

After beating Luigi Musina in an eliminator in February 1943, he faced Olle Tandberg at the end of May with the vacant European heavyweight title at stake; Sys lost by unanimous decision, but six months later beat Tandberg to become European heavyweight champion.

Sys had continued to fight during the German occupation of Belgium during World War II and in 1945 he was arrested on charges of collaboration and felony. He was stripped of his titles and asked to leave the country.

On his release he moved to Spain, where he hoped to revive his career, but after failing to get a Spanish licence turned to professional wrestling, using the name Van Will. In June 1949 he travelled to Argentina, where he obtained a licence and fought for two years, winning twelve of fourteen fights, the other two drawn, one of these a fight against Archie Moore.

He returned to Belgium and was able to resume his career in his home country, winning seven fights before taking on Hein ten Hoff at the Palais des Sports in January 1952 in an attempt to regain his European title. Sys took a points decision to become European champion for a second time at the age of 37. He lost the title two months later to Heinz Neuhaus. In August 1953 he tried to regain the title from Neuhaus, but again lost to the German.

Sys was unbeaten in his next five fights, but in May 1954 he retired in the fourth round by Niño Valdés, in what proved to be Sys' final fight. He was subsequently fined by the Belgian Boxing Federation "for seriously harming the sport of boxing". He ended his career with a record of 117 wins from 143 fights.

After facing tax demands from the Belgian government relating to his boxing winnings dating back to the pre-war period, he returned to live in Argentina.
