= Silviu Olteanu =

Romanian boxer

Personal information
- Nationality: (Romania) Romanian
- Born: Silviu Marius Olteanu; January 20, 1978 (age 48) Romania
- Height: 5 ft 2 in (157 cm)
- Weight: Flyweight

Boxing career
- Reach: 62 in (157 cm)
- Stance: Orthodox

Boxing record
- Total fights: 29
- Wins: 16
- Win by KO: 6
- Losses: 12
- Draws: 1
- No contests: 0

Silviu Olteanu (born January 20, 1978) is a Romanian professional boxer living and fighting out of Madrid, Spain. He is a former EBU (European) Flyweight champion until he vacated the title in July 2013.

== Professional career ==
Olteanu fought for the WBA World Flyweight title in December 2010 in Japan, losing in a split decision (113-115, 112-116, 118-110) against the champion Daiki Kameda.

== Professional boxing record ==
16 Wins (7 knockouts, 9 decisions), 12 Losses, 1 Draw
Res.	Record	Opponent	Type	Rd., Time	Date	Location	Notes
Loss	16-12-1	(Republic of Ireland) Paddy Barnes	MD	10	2017-06-17	(United Kingdom) Waterfront Hall, Belfast	For vacant WBO European flyweight title
Loss	16-11-1	(Italy) Mohammed Obbadi	MD	12	2016-11-19	(Italy) Palasport, Manzano	For vacant EBU-EU (European Union) flyweight title
Loss	16-10-1	(Ukraine) Artem Dalakian	TKO	8 (12)	2016-05-14	(Ukraine) Parkovy Convention Centre, Kyiv	For WBA Continental flyweight title
Win	16-9-1	(Romania) Ricardo Tanase	KO	1 (4)	2016-04-23	(Spain) Gimnasio del Rayo Vallecano, Madrid	
Loss	15-9-1	(United Kingdom) Paul Butler	TKO	6 (10)	2015-12-19	(United Kingdom) Manchester Arena (formerly M.E.N Arena), Manchester	
Loss	15-8-1	(France) Thomas Masson	UD	12	2015-09-12	(France) Pas-de-Calais	For vacant EBU Flyweight title.
Win	15-7-1	(Italy) Giuseppe Lagana	UD	6	2015-03-07	(Spain) Community of Madrid	
Loss	14-7-1	(Mexico) Armando Santos	MD	12	2014-02-01	Mexico City	For vacant IBF International Flyweight title.
Win	14-6-1	(Italy) Andrea Sarritzu	SD	12	2012-10-20	(Italy) Santa Teresa Gallura	Retained EBU Flyweight title.
Win	13-6-1	(Italy) Giuseppe Lagana	TKO	5 (12)	2012-05-25	(Italy) Montefiascone	Retained EBU Flyweight title.
Win	12-6-1	(Belarus) Valery Yanchy	SD	12	2012-03-09	(Spain) A Coruña	Won vacant EBU Flyweight title.
Draw	11-6-1	(Belarus) Valery Yanchy	MD	12	2011-10-07	(Spain) A Coruña	For vacant EBU Flyweight title.
Loss	11-6	(Spain) Xavi Urpi	PTS	8	2011-05-27	(Spain) Castellbisbal	
Loss	11-5	(Mexico) Wilbert Uicab	MD	12	2011-04-02	(Mexico) Playa del Carmen	For WBC Silver Flyweight title.
Loss	11-4	(Japan) Daiki Kameda	SD	12	2010-12-26	(Japan) Saitama	For WBA World Flyweight title.
Win	11-3	(France) Bernard Inom	UD	12	2010-05-15	(Spain) Leganés	Retained EBU-EU Flyweight title.
Win	10-3	(France) Alain Bonnel	UD	12	2009-12-19	(Spain) Madrid	Won vacant EBU-EU Flyweight title.
Win	9-3	(Bulgaria) Janko Janev	TKO	2 (6)	2009-04-04	(Spain) Leganés	
Win	8-3	(Chile) Julio Vargas	UD	6	2008-12-12	(Spain) Castellbisbal	
Win	7-3	(Bulgaria) Dimitar Alipiev	TKO	3 (6)	2008-05-17	(Spain) Fuenlabrada	
Win	6-3	(Romania) Christian Ferchi	TKO	1 (6)	2008-04-04	(Spain) San Sebastián de los Reyes	
Win	5-3	(Spain) Jordi Gallart	PTS	6	2007-11-24	(Spain) Madrid	
Win	4-3	(Spain) Joan Josep Gallart	TKO	2 (4)	2007-05-19	(Spain) Madrid	
Win	3-3	(Romania) Bogdan Condurache	RTD	5 (6)	2006-09-09	(Spain) La Muela	
Win	2-3	(Spain) Jordi Gallart	PTS	4	2006-08-20	(Spain) El Prat de Llobregat	
Win	1-3	(Spain) Carlos Ruiz	UD	4	2006-03-11	(Spain) Móstoles	
Loss	0-3	(Belarus) Valeri Yanchi	PTS	4	2005-03-12	(Spain) Narón	
Loss	0-2	(Colombia) Giovanni Jaramillo	PTS	4	2005-02-04	(Spain) Alcalá de Henares	
Loss	0-1	(Belarus) Valeri Yanchi	PTS	6	2005-01-07	(Spain) Lugo	Professional debut.
