= Thomas Lansing Masson =

American anthropologist, editor and author

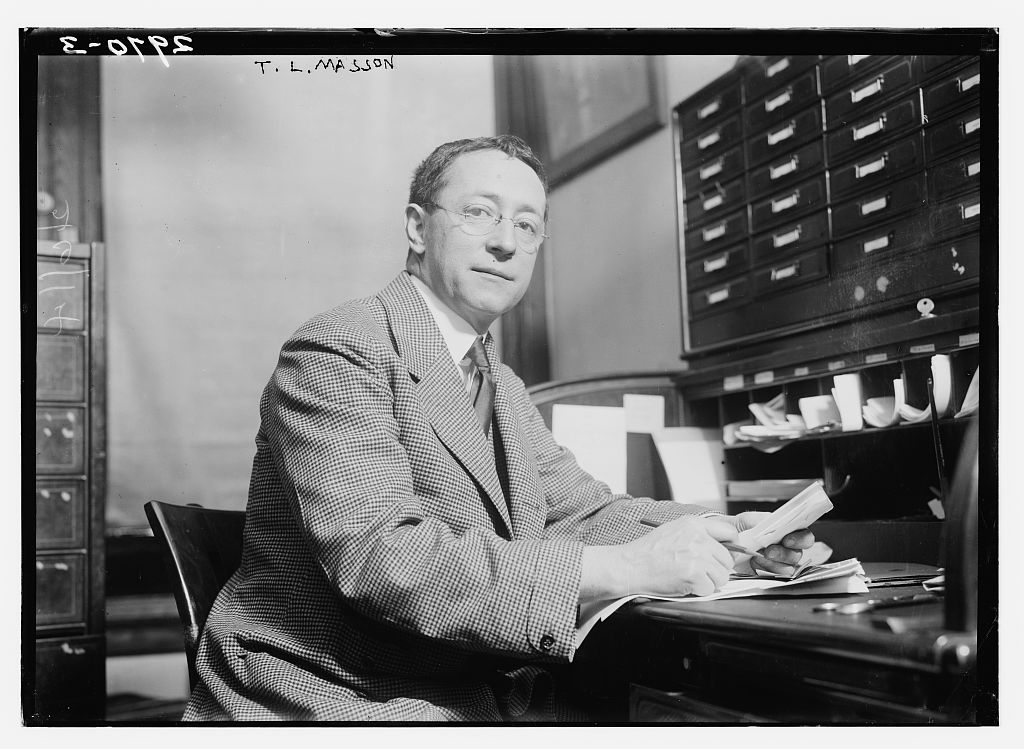
Thomas Lansing Masson

Thomas Lansing Masson (1866–1934) was an American anthropologist, editor and author.

== Biography ==
He was born at Essex, Connecticut, and educated in the public schools of New Haven. He became literary editor of Life in 1893 and a regular contributor of humorous articles to various magazines. As an editor, he was responsible for the poems listed: Humorous Masterpieces of American Literature (1904); The Humor of Love in Verse and Prose (1906); The Best Stories in the World (1914).

== Publications ==
- (1898). The Yankee Navy.
- (1904). In Marry Measure.
- (1905). A Corner in Women and Other Follies.
- (1905). Mary's Little Lamb.
- (1906). The Von Blumers.
- (1907). A Bachelor's Baby and Some Grown-Ups.
- (1908). The New Plato.
- (1913). Mr. Rum.
- (1921). Well, Why Not?.
- (1922). Listen to These.
- (1923). That Silver Lining.
- (1925). Why I Am a Spiritual Vagabond.
- (1927). The City of Perfection.
- (1932). Within.

=== Selected articles ===
- (1922). "Shall we be Wrecked by Realism," The World's Work 43, pp. 435–439.
- (1922). "Teaching Children to Teach Themselves," The World's Work 44, pp. 410–414.
