= Gustave Roth =

Belgian boxer

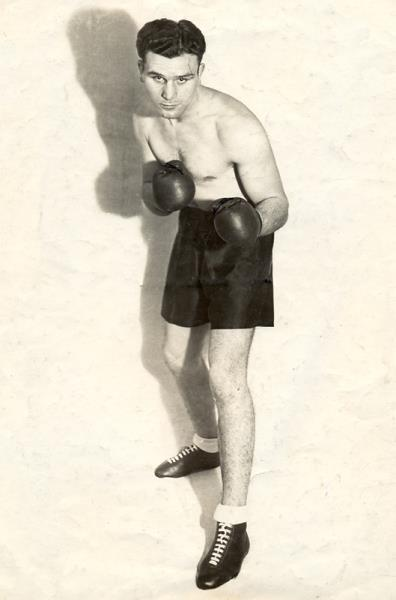

Personal information
- Nationality: Belgian
- Born: Gustave Scillie; 12 March 1909 Antwerp, Belgium
- Died: 14 September 1982 (aged 73)
- Height: 5 ft 8 in (173 cm)

Boxing career

Boxing record
- Total fights: 135
- Wins: 111
- Win by KO: 24
- Losses: 11
- Draws: 12
Medal record
Men's amateur boxing
Representing Belgium
European Amateur Championships
Silver medal – second place	1927 Berlin	Welterweight

Gustave Roth (12 March 1909 – 14 September 1982) was a Belgian professional boxer. He held the European title in two weight divisions and was also recognised as a world champion by the International Boxing Union (IBU).

== Career ==
Roth turned professional at the age of 18. He made his debut in Brussels against fellow Belgian Georges Covent, winning on points after six rounds. Early in his career he fought as a lightweight and welterweight, weighing under 70 kg. After a run of victories, he defeated German lightweight champion Fritz Ensel by knockout in the fourth round in 1929. Wins over Belgian contenders Eduard Baudry and Leo Darton earned him a shot at the European welterweight title against Alf Genon in Charleroi on 9 September 1929. Roth won on points after 15 rounds, becoming European champion at the age of 20.

He went on to defend the title successfully twelve times. Notable victories included points decisions over German champion Gustav Eder in Frankfurt (3 February 1930) and Berlin (30 August 1931), as well as a win over Dutch fighter Hub Huizenaar in Brussels (18 November 1931). In Prague on 16 March 1931, he fought Czech boxer Franta Kekolny to a disputed draw.

His thirteenth defence ended in controversy. On 26 October 1932 in Brussels, Roth was disqualified in the sixth round against fellow Belgian Adrien Anneet for a head-butt. The following year, having moved up to middleweight, he defeated German contenders Hein Domgörgen (25 February 1933, Brussels) and Johann “Gypsy” Trollmann (16 May 1933, Antwerp) on points. On 24 June 1933 in Bucharest, he regained the European middleweight title with a points victory over Romanian Gheorghe Axioti.

Roth defended the belt on 17 March 1934 in Brussels with a 15-round points win over Germany's Erich Seelig. On 3 May 1934 he met French champion Marcel Thil in Paris. At stake were the European titles in middleweight and light heavyweight, as well as the IBU world middleweight title. The IBU, founded in 1913 by European federations, was created as a rival to the American-dominated world governing bodies, but its world titles were not widely recognised in the United States. Thil won on points after 15 rounds.

On 24 April 1935 in Ostend, Roth captured the Belgian middleweight title by defeating the young Karel Sys. He later moved up again and, on 1 September 1936 in Vienna, defeated Austrian light heavyweight champion Heinz Lazek on points. On 29 October 1936 in Berlin, Roth fought Adolf Witt for the vacant European and IBU world light heavyweight titles, winning both on points after 15 rounds.

He defended these belts four times: against Italian Preciso Merlo (24 March 1937, Brussels, points), Sweden's John Andersson (1 May 1937, Antwerp, points), Karel Sys (1 December 1937, Brussels, draw), and German Jupp Besselmann (21 January 1938, Berlin, draw). On 25 March 1938 in Berlin, he lost both titles to knockout puncher Adolf Heuser, retiring in the seventh round.

Roth continued boxing until 1945 but never again fought for an international championship. He did, however, face Karel Sys twice more: losing to him on 2 July 1941 in Brussels for the Belgian heavyweight title, before regaining the national championship by defeating Sys on points in Antwerp on 25 May 1942. His final bout took place on 7 February 1945 in Brussels against Belgian light heavyweight champion Pol Goffaux, ending in a draw.

After retiring, Roth taught boxing to physical education students at the University of Louvain. In 137 professional contests, he suffered only eleven defeats, a record that ranks him among Europe's most successful boxers of his era. He died in Antwerp on 14 September 1982.
