= Joe Erskine (Welsh boxer) =

British boxer (1934–1990)

Joseph Erskine
Personal information
- Born: 26 January 1934
- Died: 18 February 1990 (aged 56)

Boxing career
- Weight class: heavyweight

Boxing record
- Total fights: 54
- Wins: 45
- Losses: 8
- Draws: 1

Joseph Erskine (26 January 1934 – 18 February 1990) was a professional boxer from the Butetown district of Cardiff, Wales. He was an Amateur Boxing Association Champion, Inter-Services Champion, and British Army Champion in 1953. He began fighting as a professional in 1954 and was trained by Archie Rule and Freddie Elvin. He held the British heavyweight title from August 1956 to June 1958. In all, he won 45 of his 54 professional bouts, losing 8, with one drawn. His best wins were against George Chuvalo, Henry Cooper, Dick Richardson, Uli Ritter, Jack Bodell, Johnny Williams, Joe Bygraves, and Willie Pastrano.

Erskine was a small heavyweight who outmanoeuvered rather than overpowered his opponents. Angelo Dundee who saw his prospect Pastrano defeated by Erskine said he was surprised by his skill – further remarking that if Erskine had been just a bit bigger he could have been a world beater.

== Career ==
On 15 December 1955, Erskine had his first fight against Henry Cooper, at Harringay Arena, in an eliminator for the British heavyweight title, and won the ten-round fight on points.

On 27 August 1956, Erskine won the British heavyweight title, which had been vacated by the retirement of Don Cockell. He beat fellow Welshman, Johnny Williams on points in a fifteen-round fight at the Maindy Stadium, Cardiff.

On 17 September 1957, he added the British Empire (Commonwealth) heavyweight title, when he beat Henry Cooper for the second time. The fight was at Harringay Arena over fifteen rounds, and was won on points.

He successfully defended his British Empire (Commonwealth) against Jamaican-born heavyweight Joe Bygraves on 25 November 1957, again winning over fifteen rounds on points.

On 21 February 1958, he unsuccessfully fought for the European heavyweight title against Ingemar Johansson, in Gothenburg, Sweden, losing on a technical knockout in the thirteenth round.

On 3 June 1958, he defended both his titles against Brian London, of Blackpool in a bout at the White City Stadium, London. Erskine was knocked out in the eighth round.

On 24 February 1959, Erskine fought and defeated the talented American boxer Willie Pastrano, who was later (in 1964) to become World light-heavyweight champion. The fight was at the Wembley Stadium over ten rounds and Erskine won on points.

On 24 June 1959, he fought another Welsh boxer, Dick Richardson in a ten-round bout at Coney Beach Arena, Porthcawl, Wales, and won on points.

In the meantime Henry Cooper had defeated Brian London to take the British and Commonwealth titles from him. On 17 November 1959, Erskine fought Cooper for both titles, having beaten him on their two previous meetings. The bout was held at the Earls Court Arena, London. Cooper won the fight on a technical knockout. Cooper, who was renowned for the power of his left hook, floored Erskine twice with terrific left hooks and Erskine was hanging almost unconscious over the lower rope when the referee stopped the bout.

On 21 March 1961, Erskine fought Cooper again for the two titles, this time at the Empire Pool, Wembley, and again lost on a technical knockout, this time in the fifth round.

Erskine went to Toronto, Ontario, Canada to fight George Chuvalo, who was hoping to show that he had the talent to fight for the world title against Floyd Patterson. Unfortunately for Chuvalo the fight, on 2 October 1961, was stopped in the fifth round and Chuvalo was disqualified for persistent head butting. Erskine claimed that he was butted eight times during the five rounds, while Chuvalo claimed he was retaliating for getting thumbed in the eye by Joe.

On 2 April 1962, he fought Cooper for the fifth and last time, this time at the Ice Rink, Nottingham. Cooper retained his titles by winning on a technical knockout in the ninth round.

On 13 October 1963, he fought the famous German southpaw, Karl Mildenberger, in Dortmund, Germany, and lost the ten-round bout on points.

On 3 March 1964, Erskine fought Jack Bodell, a British champion of the future, and defeated him on points over ten rounds.

His last fight was against Billy Walker on 27 October 1964 at the Empire Pool, Wembley. He lost the ten-round bout on points.

In his 54 professional bouts, he won 45 (13 on knock-outs), and lost 8 (6 on knock-outs). One of his bouts was drawn.

== Professional boxing record ==
45 Wins (13 knockouts, 32 decisions), 8 Losses (6 knockouts, 2 decisions), 1 Draw
Result	Record	Opponent	Type	Round	Date	Location	Notes
Loss	12–3–1	(United Kingdom) Billy Walker	PTS	10	27 October 1964	(United Kingdom) Empire Pool, Wembley, London	
Win	24–3–2	(United Kingdom) Johnny Prescott	PTS	10	21 April 1964	(United Kingdom) Embassy Sportsdrome, Birmingham, West Midlands	
Win	15–3	(United Kingdom) Jack Bodell	PTS	10	3 March 1964	(United Kingdom) Granby Halls, Leicester, Leicestershire	
Loss	37–2–1	(Germany) Karl Mildenberger	PTS	10	13 October 1963	(Germany) Westfalenhallen, Dortmund, North Rhine-Westphalia	
Win	19–15–2	(United States) Freddie Mack	PTS	10	10 August 1963	(Wales) Pavilion, Newtown, Powys	
Win	3–3	(Luxembourg) Ray Cillien	TKO	4	29 July 1963	(Wales) Cardiff Drill Hall, Cardiff	
Win	10–11	(Nigeria) Alex Barrow	KO	7	12 December 1962	(United Kingdom) Tower Circus, Blackpool, Lancashire	
Win	18–18–4	(Spain) Jose Mariano Moracia Ibanes	PTS	10	20 November 1962	(United Kingdom) Leicester, Leicestershire	
Loss	25–8–1	(United Kingdom) Henry Cooper	TKO	9	2 April 1962	(United Kingdom) Nottingham Ice Stadium, Nottingham, Nottinghamshire	Commonwealth/BBBofC Heavyweight Titles.
Win	20–6–1	(Canada) George Chuvalo	DQ	5	2 October 1961	(Canada) Toronto, Ontario	Chuvalo disqualified at 1:27 of the fifth round for headbutting.
Loss	22–7–1	(United Kingdom) Henry Cooper	TKO	5	21 March 1961	(United Kingdom) Empire Pool, Wembley, London	Commonwealth/BBBofC Heavyweight Titles.
Win	20–4–6	(Germany) Ulli Ritter	PTS	10	24 January 1961	(United Kingdom) Granby Halls, Leicester, Leicestershire	
Win	30–21–6	(Spain) José González Sales	TKO	5	22 September 1960	(Wales) Sophia Gardens, Cardiff	
Loss	19–7–1	(United Kingdom) Henry Cooper	TKO	12	17 November 1959	(United Kingdom) Earls Court Arena, Kensington, London	BBBofC/Commonwealth Heavyweight Titles.
Win	24–1–1	(Italy) Bruno Scarabellin	PTS	10	26 August 1959	(Wales) Coney Beach Pleasure Park, Porthcawl	
Win	27–8–2	(Wales) Dick Richardson	PTS	10	24 June 1959	(Wales) Coney Beach Pleasure Park, Porthcawl	
Win	47–6–5	(United States) Willie Pastrano	PTS	10	24 February 1959	(United Kingdom) Empire Exhibition Stadium, Wembley, London	
Win	9–3–1	(France) Max Brianto	PTS	10	12 November 1958	(Wales) Maindy Stadium, Cardiff	
Loss	20–3	(United Kingdom) Brian London	KO	8	3 June 1958	(United Kingdom) White City Stadium, White City, London	BBBofC/Commonwealth Heavyweight Titles.
Loss	18–0	(Sweden) Ingemar Johansson	TKO	13	21 February 1958	(Sweden) , Gothenburg	EBU Heavyweight Title.
Win	36–10–1	(Jamaica) Joe Bygraves	PTS	15	25 November 1957	(United Kingdom) Granby Halls, Leicester, Leicestershire	Commonwealth Heavyweight Title.
Win	14–5	(United Kingdom) Henry Cooper	PTS	15	17 September 1957	(United Kingdom) Harringay Arena, Harringay, London	Commonwealth/BBBofC Heavyweight Titles.
Win	23–7–1	(United Kingdom) Peter Bates	PTS	12	28 May 1957	(United Kingdom) Doncaster Racecourse, Doncaster, Yorkshire	
Loss	37–14–3	(Cuba) Nino Valdes	KO	1	19 February 1957	(United Kingdom) Earls Court Arena, Kensington, London	Erskine knocked out at 2:03 of the first round.
Win	60–9–4	(Wales) Johnny Williams	PTS	15	27 August 1956	(Wales) Maindy Stadium, Cardiff	BBBofC Heavyweight Title.
Win	17–2–1	(Wales) Dick Richardson	PTS	10	7 May 1956	(Wales) Maindy Stadium, Cardiff	
Win	17–13–8	(Germany) Guenter Nurnberg	PTS	10	19 March 1956	(Wales) Carmarthen Market Hall, Carmarthen	
Win	33–7–1	(Belgium) Marcel Limage	PTS	10	16 January 1956	(Wales) Maindy Stadium, Cardiff	
Win	11–1	(United Kingdom) Henry Cooper	PTS	10	15 November 1955	(United Kingdom) Harringay Arena, Harringay, London	BBBofC Heavyweight Title Eliminator.
Win	8–11–2	(Belgium) Bernard Verdoolaeghe	TKO	2	10 October 1955	(Wales) Sophia Gardens, Cardiff	
Win	9–1	(Italy) Antonio Crosia	KO	8	13 September 1955	(United Kingdom) White City Stadium, White City, London	
Win	17–9–6	(Italy) Uber Bacilieri	PTS	10	29 August 1955	(Wales) Maindy Stadium, Cardiff	
Win	10–3	(Netherlands) Henk de Voogd	KO	1	18 July 1955	(Wales) Maindy Stadium, Cardiff	
Win	16–19–2	(Trinidad and Tobago) Ansell Adams	PTS	10	9 May 1955	(United Kingdom) Granby Halls, Leicester, Leicestershire	
Win	21–22–3	(Jamaica) Simon Templar	TKO	8	26 April 1955	(United Kingdom) Harringay Arena, Harringay, London	
Win	16–2	(United Kingdom) Peter Bates	PTS	10	15 March 1955	(United Kingdom) Embassy Rink, Birmingham, West Midlands	
Win	8–7	(United Kingdom) Joe Crickmar	PTS	8	28 February 1955	(United Kingdom) Granby Halls, Leicester, Leicestershire	
Win	14–11–1	(United Kingdom) Cliff Purnell	PTS	8	15 February 1955	(United Kingdom) Embassy Sportsdrome, Birmingham, West Midlands	
Win	4–14–3	(Scotland) Hugh McDonald	TKO	6	1 February 1955	(United Kingdom) Willenhall Drill Hall, Willenhall, West Midlands	
Win	13–8–1	(United Kingdom) Cliff Purnell	PTS	8	7 December 1954	(United Kingdom) Town Hall, Walsall, West Midlands	
Win	1–2	(United Kingdom) Jack Walker	KO	1	8 November 1954	(United Kingdom) Granby Halls, Leicester, Leicestershire	
Win	12–9	(United Kingdom) Morrie Bush	PTS	8	11 October 1954	(Wales) Haverfordwest Market Hall, Haverfordwest	
Win	4–7	(United Kingdom) Dennis Lockton	PTS	6	28 September 1954	(United Kingdom) Olympia Skating Rink, Hanley, Staffordshire	
Win	18–4	(United Kingdom) Jimmy Moran	PTS	6	14 September 1954	(United Kingdom) Sheffield, Yorkshire	
Win	3–2	(United Kingdom) Denny Ball	PTS	6	19 July 1954	(Wales) Ninian Park, Cardiff	
Win	--	Joe Farley	KO	2	1 June 1954	(United Kingdom) White City Stadium, White City, London	Novice Tournament.
Win	1–0	(United Kingdom) Eddie Keith	KO	2	1 June 1954	(United Kingdom) White City Stadium, White City, London	Novice Tournament.
Win	2–1	(United Kingdom) Denny Ball	PTS	3	1 June 1954	(United Kingdom) White City Stadium, White City, London	Novice Tournament.
Win	3–3	(United Kingdom) Mick Cowan	PTS	6	11 May 1954	(United Kingdom) Earls Court Arena, Kensington, London	
Win	7–6–4	(United Kingdom) Frank Walshaw	PTS	6	1 May 1954	(Wales) Newtown Drill Hall, Newtown, Powys	
Draw	5–12–1	(United Kingdom) Dinny Powell	PTS	6	12 April 1954	(United Kingdom) Maindy Stadium, Cardiff	
Win	5–5	(United Kingdom) Frank Walker	DQ	5	22 March 1954	(United Kingdom) Embassy Sportsdrome, Birmingham, West Midlands	
Win	1–0	(Northern Ireland) Tommy Rogers	KO	2	16 March 1954	(United Kingdom) Willenhall Drill Hall, Willenhall, West Midlands	
Win	15–8–1	(United Kingdom) Alf Price	KO	2	9 March 1954	(United Kingdom) Olympia Skating Rink, Hanley, Staffordshire	

== Genealogical and personal information ==
Joe Erskine was the cousin of the rugby union, and rugby league footballer of the 1950s and 1960s for Cardiff IAC (RU), Wales (RL), and Halifax; Johnny Freeman. Joe later lived in Newport and frequently visited the Riverview club in Pillgwenlly. Joe stayed involved in boxing, and was a big fan of David Pearce.

He was one of many signatories in a letter to The Times on 17 July 1958 opposing 'the policy of apartheid' in international sport and defending 'the principle of racial equality which is embodied in the Declaration of the Olympic Games'.

== See also ==
- List of British heavyweight boxing champions
