= Johnny Williams (boxer) =

Welsh boxer

Personal information
- Nationality: Welsh
- Born: 25 December 1926 Barmouth, Wales
- Died: 28 January 2007 (aged 80)
- Weight: Heavyweight

Boxing career

Boxing record
- Total fights: 75
- Wins: 60
- Win by KO: 38
- Losses: 11
- Draws: 4
- No contests: 0

Johnny Williams (25 December 1926 – 28 January 2007) was a British former professional boxer in the 1940s and 1950s and was at one time both the British and Empire heavyweight champion.

== Life and career ==
Born in Barmouth, Wales, Williams grew up in Rugby, England, his family having moved there when he was a toddler. He started to box from the age of 10. He turned professional in 1946 and was known for his scientific approach in the ring, with one of his greatest fights being a bout with Jack Gardner on 17 July 1950 in Leicester. It was a Commonwealth title eliminator fight and he lost on points, and according to the BBC it was rated as one of the most grueling bouts ever staged in Britain and left both boxers requiring a night in hospital.

Two years later on 11 March 1952, Williams had his finest hour, when in a rematch with Gardner, he won the 15 round fight, claiming both the British and Empire Heavyweight titles. However the following year he lost these titles to Don Cockell.

Williams made an attempt at winning back the titles in 1955, but was defeated in a fifth-round knockout by Gardner.

Williams retired in 1956 with 60 wins, 38 by knockout, 11 losses and 4 draws, and began a career as a farmer at Newton near Rugby.

He died on 28 January 2007 survived by his wife and daughter.

== Professional boxing record ==
60 Wins (38 knockouts, 22 decisions), 11 Losses (6 knockouts, 5 decisions), 4 Draws
Result	Record	Opponent	Type	Round	Date	Location	Notes
Loss	33-9	(Jamaica) Joe Bygraves	TKO	6	1956-11-16	(United Kingdom) Belle Vue Zoological Gardens, Belle Vue, Manchester	
Loss	28-0-1	(Wales) Joe Erskine	PTS	15	1956-08-27	(Wales) Maindy Stadium, Cardiff	BBBofC Heavyweight Title.
Loss	26-4-1	(United States) Tommy "Hurricane" Jackson	TKO	4	1956-04-13	(United States) Uline Arena, Washington, D.C.	Referee stopped the bout at 2:49 of the fourth round.
Draw	45-5-1	(Germany) Willi Hoepner	PTS	10	1956-02-04	(Germany) Festhalle Frankfurt, Frankfurt, Hesse	
Win	23-3-2	(Tonga) Kitione Lave	TKO	1	1955-07-26	(United Kingdom) Embassy Sportsdrome, Birmingham, West Midlands	
Loss	26-5	(United Kingdom) Jack Gardner	KO	5	1955-06-06	(United Kingdom) Nottingham Ice Stadium, Nottingham, Nottinghamshire	BBBofC/Commonwealth Heavyweight Title Eliminators.
Win	7-4-1	(France) Lucien Touzard	TKO	3	1955-04-18	(Wales) Maindy Stadium, Cardiff	
Win	13-2-1	(Netherlands) Hennie Quentemeijer	KO	2	1955-03-05	(Wales) Newtown, Powys	
Win	12-3-1	(France) Roger Francis Coeuret	TKO	4	1954-12-10	(United Kingdom) Belle Vue Zoological Gardens, Belle Vue, Manchester	
Win	15-2	(United Kingdom) "Miracle" Jack Hobbs	TKO	7	1954-09-14	(United Kingdom) Harringay Arena, London	
Win	14-3-10	(Germany) Hugo Salfeld	PTS	10	1954-04-04	(Germany) Stadion Rote Erde, Dortmund, North Rhine-Westphalia	
Win	42-4-6	(Germany) Gerhard Hecht	KO	2	1954-01-22	(Germany) Sportpalast, Schoeneberg, Berlin	
Win	4-4-1	(Belgium) Bernard Verdoolaeghe	PTS	10	1953-11-10	(United Kingdom) Empress Hall, Earl's Court, London	
Win	28-7	(United Kingdom) Fred Powell	KO	2	1953-10-05	(United Kingdom) Granby Halls, Leicester, Leicestershire	
Loss	59-11-1	(United Kingdom) Don Cockell	PTS	15	1953-05-12	(United Kingdom) Harringay Arena, London	BBBofC/Commonwealth Heavyweight Titles.
Win	15-11-1	(Trinidad and Tobago) Ansell Adams	PTS	10	1953-04-13	(United Kingdom) Granby Halls, Leicester, Leicestershire	
Loss	25-1-4	(Germany) Heinz Neuhaus	KO	9	1953-02-15	(Germany) Westfalenhallen, Dortmund, North Rhine-Westphalia	
Win	23-2-4	(Luxembourg) Werner Wiegand	KO	5	1952-12-10	(United Kingdom) Harringay Arena, London	
Win	20-2	(South Africa) John Duncan Arthur	TKO	7	1952-10-13	(United Kingdom) Granby Halls, Leicester, Leicestershire	Commonwealth Heavyweight Title.
Win	13-13-7	(United States) Jimmy Rouse	TKO	7	1952-07-22	(United States) Meadowbrook Bowl, Newark, New Jersey	
Win	22-4	(United Kingdom) Jack Gardner	PTS	15	1952-03-11	(United Kingdom) Empress Hall, Earl's Court, London	BBBofC/Commonwealth Heavyweight Titles.
Win	46-15	(Cuba) Omelio Agramonte	PTS	10	1951-12-04	(United Kingdom) Harringay Arena, London	
Draw	21-0-3	(Germany) Heinz Neuhaus	PTS	10	1951-10-14	(Germany) Stadion Rote Erde, Dortmund, North Rhine-Westphalia	
Win	28-8-1	(Austria) Jo Weidin	TKO	6	1951-06-05	(United Kingdom) White City Stadium, London	
Win	17-3	(United States) Aaron Wilson	PTS	8	1951-03-27	(United Kingdom) Empress Hall, Earl's Court, London	
Win	29-5-4	(United Kingdom) Reg Andrews	KO	2	1951-03-19	(United Kingdom) Granby Halls, Leicester, Leicestershire	
Loss	42-21-5	(United States) Bill Weinberg	TKO	6	1950-12-12	(United Kingdom) Harringay Arena, London	
Win	19-2	(United States) George Kaplan	TKO	7	1950-11-14	(United Kingdom) Earls Court Arena, London	
Loss	19-2	(United Kingdom) Jack Gardner	PTS	12	1950-07-17	(United Kingdom) Granby Halls, Leicester, Leicestershire	
Loss	72-11-2	(United States) Pat Comiskey	TKO	6	1950-06-06	(United Kingdom) White City Stadium, London	
Win	23-11	(Canada) Vern Escoe	PTS	10	1950-02-28	(United Kingdom) Harringay Arena, London	
Win	18-8	(Jamaica) Lloyd Barnett	PTS	10	1950-02-20	(United Kingdom) Embassy Sportsdrome, Birmingham, West Midlands	
Win	18-10	(Belgium) Piet Wilde	KO	4	1950-01-24	(United Kingdom) Empress Hall, Earl's Court, London	
Win	19-8-1	(France) Stephane Olek	PTS	8	1949-09-06	(United Kingdom) Harringay Arena, London	
Win	17-8	(Belgium) Piet Wilde	PTS	10	1949-08-17	(Wales) Coney Beach Pleasure Park, Porthcawl	
Win	11-4	(Northern Ireland) Paddy Slavin	TKO	3	1949-06-20	(United Kingdom) St Andrew's, Birmingham, West Midlands	
Win	10-5-1	(Sweden) Nils Andersson	PTS	8	1949-06-02	(United Kingdom) White City Stadium, London	
Win	23-8-4	(Scotland) Ken Shaw	TKO	8	1949-04-19	(United Kingdom) Royal Albert Hall, London	
Win	14-6-2	(South Africa) Nick Wolmarans	TKO	4	1949-01-29	(South Africa) Wembley Stadium, Johannesburg, Gauteng	
Win	3-3-1	(South Africa) Billy Wood	KO	4	1948-12-16	(South Africa) City Hall, Durban, Kwa-Zulu Natal	
Win	10-6	(South Africa) Fred Vorster	PTS	8	1948-11-06	(South Africa) Wembley Stadium, Johannesburg, Gauteng	
Win	17-9-3	(United Kingdom) Jock Frederick Taylor	PTS	6	1948-09-21	(United Kingdom) Harringay Arena, London	
Win	22-13-7	(United Kingdom) Reg Spring	TKO	6	1948-09-02	(United Kingdom) Exeter Civic Hall, Exeter, Devon	
Win	32-4-1	(United Kingdom) Don Cockell	TKO	2	1948-07-27	(United Kingdom) Embassy Rink, Birmingham, West Midlands	
Win	7-12	(Canada) Gene "KO" Fowler	KO	3	1948-06-22	(United Kingdom) St James Park, Exeter, Devon	
Loss	28-4-1	(United Kingdom) Don Cockell	PTS	8	1948-05-18	(United Kingdom) Highfield Road, Coventry, West Midlands	
Win	6-0	(Scotland) Bobby Ogg	PTS	6	1948-04-20	(United Kingdom) Harringay Arena, London	
Win	1-0	(United Kingdom) Sid Falconer	RTD	3	1948-03-11	(United Kingdom) Smethwick, Sandwell, West Midlands	
Win	1-0	(Wales) Billy Phillips	TKO	3	1948-02-17	(United Kingdom) Harringay Arena, London	
Win	21-3	(United Kingdom) Allan Cooke	TKO	1	1948-02-12	(United Kingdom) Hull Arena, Hull, Yorkshire	
Win	12-12-3	(Northern Ireland) Matt Locke	KO	1	1948-01-26	(United Kingdom) Coventry Drill Hall, Coventry, West Midlands	
Win	13-13-1	(Wales) Des Jones	PTS	8	1948-01-15	(United Kingdom) Rink Market, Smethwick, Sandwell, West Midlands	
Loss	14-10-6	(United Kingdom) Reg Spring	PTS	8	1947-12-02	(United Kingdom) Co-op Hall, Rugby, Warwickshire	
Win	4-1	(Wales) Doug Richards	PTS	8	1947-11-24	(United Kingdom) Cheltenham Town Hall, Cheltenham, Gloucestershire	
Win	7-7	(United Kingdom) George Barratt	TKO	3	1947-11-10	(United Kingdom) Coventry, West Midlands	
Win	9-7-1	(United Kingdom) Jimmy Carroll	KO	5	1947-11-03	(United Kingdom) Granby Halls, Leicester, Leicestershire	
Win	27-27-7	(Wales) Trevor Burt	KO	2	1947-09-16	(United Kingdom) Battery Drill Hall, Rugby, Warwickshire	
Win	7-6	(United Kingdom) Jimmy Carroll	TKO	5	1947-08-12	(United Kingdom) Wembley Town Hall, London	
Win	--	(United Kingdom) Bernard O'Neill	TKO	2	1947-07-07	(United Kingdom) Wembley Town Hall, London	
Draw	26-7-5	(Wales) Johnny Houlston	PTS	8	1947-06-16	(Wales) Corporation Bus Depot, Newport	
Win	41-59-5	(Republic of Ireland) Paddy Roche	TKO	7	1947-04-03	(United Kingdom) Leamington, Warwickshire	
Win	2-1	(Republic of Ireland) Jock Kerry	TKO	5	1947-03-24	(United Kingdom) Birmingham, West Midlands	
Win	2-2	(United Kingdom) Wally With	PTS	8	1947-03-19	(United Kingdom) Caledonian Road Baths, London	
Win	2-3	(United Kingdom) Art Owen	TKO	6	1947-02-24	(United Kingdom) Kettering, Northamptonshire	
Win	19-42-6	(United Kingdom) Ted Barter	KO	3	1947-02-10	(United Kingdom) Oxford Town Hall, Oxford, Oxfordshire	
Win	2-2-2	(United Kingdom) Tommy Bostock	TKO	4	1946-12-09	(United Kingdom) Assembly Rooms, Market Harborough, Leicestershire	
Win	0-1	(United Kingdom) Joe Burt	PTS	8	1946-11-04	(United Kingdom) Birmingham, West Midlands	
Draw	12-3-4	(United Kingdom) Jim Greaves	PTS	8	1946-10-21	(United Kingdom) Granby Halls, Leicester, Leicestershire	
Win	7-2-1	(United Kingdom) Jim Hollis	PTS	6	1946-09-24	(United Kingdom) Embassy Rink, Birmingham, West Midlands	
Win	12-17-2	(United Kingdom) Harry O'Grady	KO	4	1946-06-04	(United Kingdom) Battery Drill Hall, Rugby, Warwickshire	
Win	--	(United Kingdom) Joe Williams	PTS	8	1946-04-15	(United Kingdom) Birmingham, West Midlands	
Win	5-4	(United Kingdom) "Seaman" Tom Smith	TKO	5	1946-04-01	(United Kingdom) Birmingham, West Midlands	
Win	--	Michael Guerin	KO	1	1946-02-26	(United Kingdom) Co-op Hall, Rugby, Warwickshire	Guerin knocked out at 1:40 of the first round.
Win	2-3	(United Kingdom) "Seaman" Tom Smith	PTS	6	1946-02-15	(United Kingdom) Crossington Street Baths, Leicester, Leicestershire	
Win	1-0	(United Kingdom) Billy Rhodes	PTS	6	1946-02-12	(United Kingdom) Crossington Street Baths, Leicester, Leicestershire	

== See also ==
- List of British heavyweight boxing champions
- List of Commonwealth Boxing Council champions
