= Joe Bygraves =

Jamaican-British boxer (1931–2012)

Personal information
- Nationality: British
- Born: 25 May 1931 Kingston, Jamaica
- Died: 16 January 2012 (aged 80)
- Height: 185 cm (6 ft 1 in)
- Weight: Heavyweight

Boxing career
- Stance: Orthodox

Boxing record
- Total fights: 72
- Wins: 42
- Win by KO: 22
- Losses: 28
- Draws: 2
- No contests: 0

Joe Bygraves (26 May 1931 – 16 January 2012) was a Jamaican heavyweight boxer. Bygraves turned professional in 1953, and after an impressive early career he successfully challenged Kitione Lave for the vacant Commonwealth Heavyweight belt in 1956. Bygraves defended the title on three occasions, knocking-out Henry Cooper and holding Dick Richardson to a draw before losing the championship to Joe Erskine. Bygraves immigrated to Britain as a youth but did not take British citizenship until the end of his fighting career in 1967.

== Boxing career ==
Bygraves was born into a large family of 11 siblings, in Kingston, Jamaica in 1931. He immigrated to Britain at the age of 15 and settled in Liverpool. He began his amateur career at the age of 17 for The Provincial Amateur boxing club in Birkenhead run by Johnny Campbell. First as a light heavyweight and then moving up to the heavyweight division. He was successful at both weights, winning amateur county titles.

Bygraves turned professional in 1953, managed by Johnny Campbell, his first paid encounter was against Don Maxwell on 12 February. The fight lasted just 65 seconds, Bygraves winning by knockout. Bygraves won the next five fights, six and eight round encounters, mainly on points decisions, but he was stopped for the first time in his professional career by Joe Crickmar in a novice heavyweight competition. Despite the loss Bygraves' career continued to impress and by the end of 1954 he had accumulated 24 wins to only 4 losses. His final fight of 1954 was a loss by points decision to Polly Smith, a fighter he had beaten just two months prior.

Bygraves began 1955 in the same way he ended 1954, with a loss. After several months away from the ring, Bygraves returned to face rising British fighter Henry Cooper. The eight round scheduled fight went the distance, with Cooper given the decision. Bygraves followed this with a string of four wins, including a victory over Tongan Kitione Lave, and his first fight outside the United Kingdom, a technical knockout of Hugo Salfeld in Germany. Bygraves then travelled to Italy, for a string of three fights. He lost the first to European Boxing Champion Franco Cavicchi when he was disqualified in the eighth round, but then took two victories when he beat Aldo Pellegrini in Milan and Uber Bacilieri in Bologna.

On 24 February 1956, Bygraves travelled to Sweden to face the then unbeaten Ingemar Johansson. The eight round contest ended in a points decision for Johansson. Two months later, Bygraves was back in a British ring, facing ex-British heavyweight champion Jack Gardner, whom he stopped in the second round. A second successive win, this time against Marcel Limage in Cardiff, gave Bygraves a shot at the vacant Commonwealth Heavyweight title. Despite living in Britain for near ten years, Bygraves was not allowed to fight for the British titles as he was not born there. His opponent for the title fight was Kitione Lave, who he had beaten the previous year. Held at the Empire Pool in London on 26 June 1956, the match was scheduled for 15 rounds, the first time Bygraves had contested a fight of this length. The bout went the distance, with the judges declaring Bygraves the victor, and new Commonwealth champion.

Bygraves lost his next fight to American Wayne Bethea, and this was followed by a win over another ex-British Heavyweight champion, Johnny Williams. His first title defence was on 19 February 1957, against Henry Cooper. The fight is regarded as one of Bygraves best of his career, stopping Cooper via technical knockout in the ninth round. Just three months later, Bygraves defended the Commonwealth belt again, on this occasion the challenger was Welshman Dick Richardson. The fight ended in a draw, and as holder Bygraves retained his title. His third and final defence of his Commonwealth title again came from Wales, this time against Joe Erskine. As with the Richardson fight, the bout went the full fifteen rounds, but on this occasion the decision went to Erskine, stripping Bygraves of his title.

After the Erskine fight, Bygraves struggled for success, and in more and more fights he ended as the loser. He still faced some notable fighters included losses to Americans Willie Pastrano and Zora Folley, and another failed attempt at Ingemar Johansson. One of his last wins was over Olympic gold medalist Franco De Piccoli in 1963, and in 1965 he failed to beat Canadian heavyweight champion George Chuvalo at the Albert Hall in London. His last recorded professional bout was against Hector Eduardo Corletti on 20 March 1967.

== Professional boxing record ==
42 Wins (22 knockouts, 20 decisions), 28 Losses (7 knockouts, 21 decisions), 2 Draws Archived 29 May 2013 at the Wayback Machine
Result	Record	Opponent	Type	Round	Date	Location	Notes
Loss	17-2-5	(Argentina) Hector Eduardo Corletti	PTS	10	20 Mar 1967	(United Kingdom) London Hilton on Park Lane Hotel, Mayfair, London	48.5–49.75.
Loss	33-10-2	(Canada) George Chuvalo	PTS	10	7 Dec 1965	(United Kingdom) Royal Albert Hall, Kensington, London	
Loss	29-3-1	(Germany) Gerhard Zech	PTS	10	6 Mar 1965	(Germany) Neue Sporthalle, Hannover, Lower Saxony	
Win	36-11-5	(Germany) Albert Westphal	KO	1	13 Feb 1965	(Germany) Ernst Merck Halle, Hamburg	Westphal knocked out at 1:00 of the first round.
Loss	10-2-1	(United Kingdom) Billy Walker	DQ	6	28 Jan 1964	(United Kingdom) The Olympia, Kensington, London	Bygraves disqualified for a low blow.
Loss	25-1-1	(Germany) Gerhard Zech	TKO	9	8 Nov 1963	(Germany) Sportpalast, Schoeneberg, Berlin	
Loss	45-4-3	(Italy) Santo Amonti	PTS	10	13 Sep 1963	(Italy) Palazzetto dello Sport, Rome, Lazio	
Loss	15-10-2	(United Kingdom) Ray Shiel	DQ	5	22 Aug 1963	(United Kingdom) Liverpool Stadium, Liverpool, Merseyside	Bygraves disqualified for headbutting.
Win	25-1	(Italy) Franco De Piccoli	KO	5	7 Jun 1963	(Italy) Palazzetto dello Sport, Rome, Lazio	
Loss	18-2-1	(United States) Bill Nielsen	TKO	6	21 Apr 1963	(Sweden) Johanneshovs Isstadion, Stockholm	
Draw	43-20-5	(Netherlands) Wim Snoek	PTS	10	8 Apr 1963	(Netherlands) Rotterdam	
Loss	33-2	(Germany) Karl Mildenberger	PTS	3	30 Nov 1962	(Germany) Festhalle Frankfurt, Frankfurt, Hesse	
Loss	24-17-2	(United States) Wayne Bethea	UD	10	22 Sep 1962	The National Stadium, Kingston, Jamaica	91-92, 95-98, 95–97.
Loss	22-2	(Sweden) Ingemar Johansson	TKO	7	9 Feb 1962	(Sweden) Maesshallen Sports Hall, Gothenburg	Referee stopped the bout at 2:08 of the seventh round.
Win	9-8	(Nigeria) Alex Barrow	KO	2	4 Dec 1961	(United Kingdom) Granby Halls, Leicester, Leicestershire	
Win	16-0	(Germany) Gerhard Zech	TKO	4	3 Nov 1961	(Germany) Ernst Merck Halle, Hamburg	
Loss	62-9-3	(Italy) Franco Cavicchi	PTS	10	27 Jun 1960	(Italy) Bologna, Emilia-Romagna	
Loss	16-1	(United States) Joe Hemphill	PTS	8	18 May 1960	(United States) Chicago Stadium, Chicago, Illinois	
Loss	26-1	(United States) Roy Harris	UD	10	25 Aug 1959	(United States) Sam Houston Coliseum, Houston, Texas	
Loss	23-0	(Italy) Giacomo Bozzano	PTS	10	19 Apr 1959	(Italy) Velodromo Vigorelli, Milan, Lombardy	
Win	5-2	(Tonga) Feleti Fred Kaho	TKO	7	2 Mar 1959	(United Kingdom) Farrer Street Stadium, Middlesbrough, Yorkshire	
Loss	41-3-2	(United States) Zora Folley	TKO	9	24 Nov 1958	(United Kingdom) Granby Halls, Leicester, Leicestershire	Referee stopped the bout at 2:59 of the ninth round.
Loss	44-5-5	(United States) Willie Pastrano	PTS	10	21 Apr 1958	(United Kingdom) Granby Halls, Leicester, Leicestershire	
Win	8-1	(Ghana) Joey Armstrong	TKO	3	10 Feb 1958	(United Kingdom) Leeds, Yorkshire	
Loss	31-1-1	(United Kingdom) Joe Erskine	PTS	15	25 Nov 1957	(United Kingdom) Granby Halls, Leicester, Leicestershire	Commonwealth Heavyweight Title.
Win	31-8-2	(Tonga) Kitione Lave	PTS	10	18 Sep 1957	(United Kingdom) Pontypridd	
Loss	39-6-6	(Germany) Heinz Neuhaus	DQ	6	15 Jun 1957	(Germany) Westfalenhallen, Dortmund, North Rhine-Westphalia	
Draw	21-4-1	(United Kingdom) Dick Richardson	PTS	15	27 May 1957	(United Kingdom) Maindy Stadium, Cardiff	Commonwealth Heavyweight Title.
Win	14-3	(United Kingdom) Henry Cooper	KO	9	19 Feb 1957	(United Kingdom) Earls Court Arena, Kensington, London	Commonwealth Heavyweight Title.
Win	60-10-4	(United Kingdom) Johnny Williams	TKO	6	16 Nov 1956	(United Kingdom) Belle Vue Zoological Gardens, Belle Vue, Manchester	
Loss	11-4-2	(United States) Wayne Bethea	TKO	5	24 Sep 1956	(United States) St. Nicholas Arena, New York City	Bygraves did not come out for the sixth round.
Win	29-6-2	(Tonga) Kitione Lave	PTS	15	26 Jun 1956	(United Kingdom) Empire Pool, Wembley, London	Commonwealth Heavyweight Title.
Win	34-9-1	(Belgium) Marcel Limage	RTD	8	7 May 1956	(United Kingdom) Maindy Stadium, Cardiff	
Win	28-5	(United Kingdom) Jack Gardner	TKO	2	24 Apr 1956	(United Kingdom) Earls Court Arena, Kensington, London	
Loss	12-0	(Sweden) Ingemar Johansson	PTS	8	24 Feb 1956	(Sweden) Masshallen, Gothenburg	
Win	17-11-6	(Italy) Uber Bacilieri	PTS	10	23 Jan 1956	(Italy) Bologna, Emilia-Romagna	
Win	19-5	(Italy) Aldo Pellegrini	KO	1	17 Dec 1955	(Italy) Palasport di San Siro, Milan, Lombardy	
Loss	38-2-2	(Italy) Franco Cavicchi	DQ	8	31 Oct 1955	(Italy) Palazzo dello Sport, Bologna, Emilia-Romagna	
Win	25-4-2	(Tonga) Kitione Lave	PTS	8	19 Sep 1955	(United Kingdom) Perry Barr Stadium, Birmingham, West Midlands	
Win	15-6-10	(Germany) Hugo Salfeld	TKO	5	4 Sep 1955	(Germany) Westfalenhallen, Dortmund, North Rhine-Westphalia	
Win	17-3-1	(United Kingdom) Peter Bates	PTS	8	6 Jun 1955	(United Kingdom) Nottingham Ice Stadium, Nottingham, Nottinghamshire	
Win	12-3	(United Kingdom) Eddie Hearn	KO	4	5 May 1955	(United Kingdom) Liverpool Stadium, Liverpool, Merseyside	
Loss	8-0	(United Kingdom) Henry Cooper	PTS	8	18 Apr 1955	(United Kingdom) Manor Place Baths, Walworth, London	
Loss	14-12-3	(Bermuda) Ed "Polly" Smith	PTS	8	4 Nov 1954	(United Kingdom) Liverpool Stadium, Liverpool, Merseyside	
Win	30-10	(United Kingdom) Fred Powell	PTS	8	25 Oct 1954	(United Kingdom) Carmarthen Market hall, Carmarthen	
Win	14-11-3	(Bermuda) Ed "Polly" Smith	PTS	8	12 Oct 1954	(United Kingdom) Royal Albert Hall, Kensington, London	
Win	20-21-1	(Republic of Ireland) Paddy Slavin	PTS	8	2 Oct 1954	(United Kingdom) King's Hall, Belfast	
Win	3-5	(Trinidad and Tobago) Clair Redmond	KO	3	19 Aug 1954	(United Kingdom) Liverpool Stadium, Liverpool, Merseyside	
Win	6-1	(United Kingdom) Peter Bates	PTS	8	2 Jul 1954	(United Kingdom) Belle Vue Zoological Gardens, Belle Vue, Manchester	
Win	17-10-1	(United Kingdom) Frank Bell	PTS	8	30 Apr 1954	(United Kingdom) Belle Vue Zoological Gardens, Belle Vue, Manchester	
Win	20-19-1	(Republic of Ireland) Paddy Slavin	PTS	8	14 Apr 1954	(United Kingdom) Liverpool Stadium, Liverpool, Merseyside	
Win	6-22-2	(United Kingdom) Terry O'Connor	TKO	3	30 Mar 1954	(United Kingdom) Earls Court Arena, Kensington, London	
Win	7-4	(United Kingdom) Joe Crickmar	PTS	8	18 Mar 1954	(United Kingdom) Liverpool Stadium, Liverpool, Merseyside	
Win	23-4	(United Kingdom) Terry McDonald	KO	1	12 Mar 1954	(United Kingdom) Belle Vue Zoological Gardens, Belle Vue, Manchester	
Loss	63-15-5	(United Kingdom) Albert Finch	PTS	8	23 Feb 1954	(United Kingdom) Royal Albert Hall, Kensington, London	
Win	20-18-1	(Republic of Ireland) Paddy Slavin	PTS	8	11 Feb 1954	(United Kingdom) Liverpool Stadium, Liverpool, Merseyside	
Win	15-16-3	(Jamaica) Simon Templar	PTS	8	18 Dec 1953	(United Kingdom) Tower Circus, Blackpool, Lancashire	
Win	28-8	(United Kingdom) Fred Powell	TKO	7	10 Nov 1953	(United Kingdom) Empress Hall, Earl's Court, Kensington, London	
Win	10-3-1	(United Kingdom) Cliff Purnell	KO	2	29 Oct 1953	(United Kingdom) Liverpool Stadium, Liverpool, Merseyside	
Win	5-0	(United Kingdom) Peter Toch	TKO	3	20 Oct 1953	(United Kingdom) Streatham Ice Arena, Streatham, London, England	
Win	18-7	(United Kingdom) George Stern	DQ	3	8 Oct 1953	(United Kingdom) Liverpool Stadium, Liverpool, Merseyside	
Loss	9-3-1	(United Kingdom) Cliff Purnell	PTS	6	17 Sep 1953	(United Kingdom) Liverpool Stadium, Liverpool, Merseyside	
Win	10-3	(United Kingdom) Hugh Ferns	PTS	6	3 Sep 1953	(United Kingdom) Liverpool Stadium, Liverpool, Merseyside	
Win	2-6	(United Kingdom) Alex Roman	TKO	1	13 Aug 1953	(United Kingdom) Liverpool Stadium, Liverpool, Merseyside	
Loss	5-3	(United Kingdom) Joe Crickmar	TKO	5	16 Jul 1953	(United Kingdom) Liverpool Stadium, Liverpool, Merseyside	
Loss	4-2	(United Kingdom) Joe Crickmar	KO	2	9 Jun 1953	(United Kingdom) White City Stadium, White City, London	Novice Tournament.
Win	7-15	(United Kingdom) Peter McMann	TKO	1	14 May 1953	(United Kingdom) Liverpool Stadium, Liverpool, Merseyside	
Win	12-13-1	(United Kingdom) Wally Curtis	PTS	8	23 Apr 1953	(United Kingdom) Liverpool Stadium, Liverpool, Merseyside	
Win	16-6	(United Kingdom) Ken Wyatt	PTS	6	9 Apr 1953	(United Kingdom) Liverpool Stadium, Liverpool, Merseyside	
Win	4-15-4	(Jamaica) Les Johnson	PTS	6	26 Mar 1953	(United Kingdom) Liverpool Stadium, Liverpool, Merseyside	
Win	8-1	(United Kingdom) Hugh Ferns	PTS	6	12 Mar 1953	(United Kingdom) Liverpool Stadium, Liverpool, Merseyside	
Win	1-1	(United Kingdom) Don Maxwell	KO	1	12 Feb 1953	(United Kingdom) Liverpool Stadium, Liverpool, Merseyside	
