= Jo Weidin =

Austrian boxer

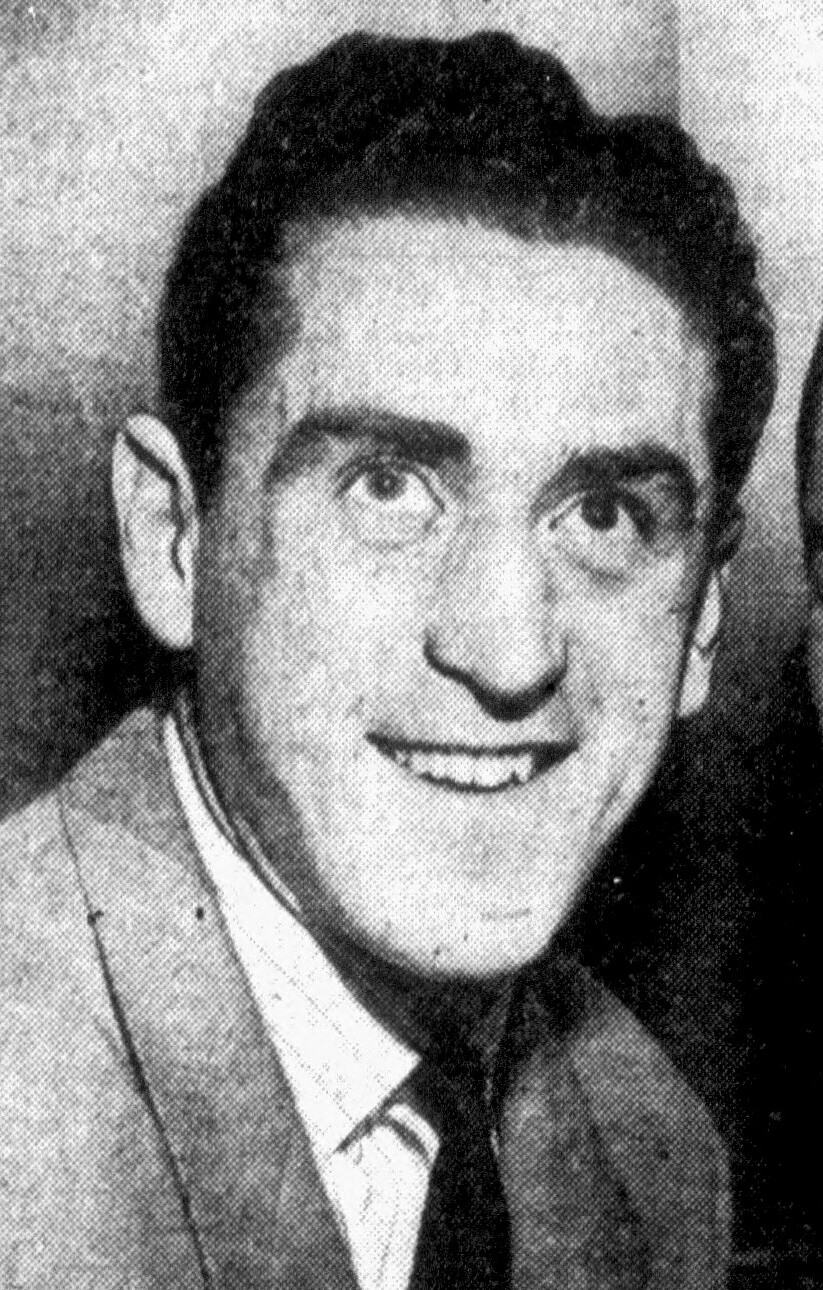
- Weidin, circa 1949

Personal information
- Nationality: Austrian
- Born: Josef Weidinger; 5 April 1923 Vienna, Austria
- Died: 26 June 2002 (aged 79)
- Height: 6 ft 3 1/2 in
- Weight: Heavyweight

Boxing career

Boxing record
- Total fights: 46
- Wins: 31
- Win by KO: 24
- Losses: 14
- Draws: 1

Josef "Joschi" Weidinger (25 April 1923 – 26 June 2002), better known as Jo Weidin, was an Austrian boxer who won the European Boxing Union heavyweight title in 1950.

== Career ==
Born in Vienna, Weidin made his professional debut in December 1945 with a third-round knockout of Stefan Schmidt. In 1947 he beat Jan Declercq, Enrico Bertola, Stephane Olek, and Robert Eugene to win a European heavyweight tournament (with no title at stake).

In 1948 he travelled to the United States, where he was described as "Jack Dempsey's protege" and "the post-war Jewish hope for heavyweight honors" (despite not actually being Jewish), and recorded four wins and four losses, two of his defeats at the hands of Freddie Beshore and Lee Oma.

Back in Austria he won his next three fights, including a second-round stoppage of Heinz Lazek in September 1949. He lost on points to Olek in Paris in January 1950, with no title at stake, but when the two met again in Vienna in June for the vacant EBU European heavyweight title, Wiedin was victorious, becoming the new European champion. Weidin lost the title in his first defence, losing on points to Jack Gardner in March 1951.

Weidin had nine further fights, beating future South African champion Johnny Arthur in December 1951, but suffering defeats to Johnny Williams, Karel Sys, Hein ten Hoff, and Tommy Farr. His final fight, against Hugo Salfeld in November 1952, also ended in defeat.

Weidin retired with a record of 31 wins from 46 fights.

He went on to act as president of the local professional boxing association and as a board member of SK Rapid Wien.

Weidin died on 26 June 2002, at the age of 79, after a long illness.
