= Willie Pastrano =

American boxer (1935–1997)

Personal information
- Born: Wilfred Raleigh Pastrano; November 27, 1935 New Orleans, Louisiana, U.S.
- Died: December 6, 1997 (aged 62) New Orleans, Louisiana, U.S.
- Height: 5 ft 10 in (178 cm)
- Weight: Light heavyweight

Boxing career
- Reach: 72 in (183 cm)
- Stance: Orthodox

Boxing record
- Total fights: 83
- Wins: 62
- Win by KO: 14
- Losses: 13
- Draws: 8

Wilfred Raleigh Pastrano (November 27, 1935 – December 6, 1997) was an American professional boxer who competed from 1951 to 1965. He held the undisputed WBA, WBC, and The Ring light heavyweight titles between 1963 and 1965.

== Early life ==
Pastrano was born in New Orleans. Pastrano's best friend, Ralph Dupas started training in boxing at a local gym. Pastrano, who weighed over 250 pounds, decided to start working out with his friend.

As Willie lost weight, he realized two things. First, he loved boxing. Second, he hated getting hit. So, Pastrano developed a style of boxing in which he hardly got hit, and in return, tried not to hurt his opponent as well.

Pastrano was already married as a teenager, and by 1962, he and his wife Faye had five children: John (born 1955), Donna (1957), Frank (1959), Nicholas (1960), and Angelo (1962).

== Pro career ==
Pastrano began his career at the age of 16. He fought many heavyweights and outpointed heavyweight contenders Rex Layne, Brian London, and Tom McNeeley.

Pastrano won the world light heavyweight championship when he outpointed the great Harold Johnson on a close 15-round decision. He successfully defended his crown by stopping Gregorio Peralta of Argentina on a TKO, and by coming back from a certain defeat on points to KO English challenger Terry Downes in 11 rounds in Manchester, England. Pastrano lost his crown when he was TKOed by José Torres in 10 rounds (the same fight where the ringside doctor asked if he knew where he was, leading to Pastrano's legendary line of "You're damn right I know where I am! I'm in Madison Square Garden getting the shit kicked out of me!"). In the Torres fight, Pastrano was knocked down for the only time in his career by a powerful left hook to the liver. Pastrano retired after that match and never fought again.

Managed by the legendary Angelo Dundee, Pastrano was a smooth, quick boxer with a great left hand. He was a stablemate of Cassius Clay and often sparred with the future champion early in Clay's career. His talent was dissipated by his aversion to training and a fondness for partying and carousing. His success was also limited by his lack of punching power, hence his record of only 14 knockout wins in his 84 fights. Nevertheless, he defeated most of the light heavyweight challengers of his generation. He also outpointed former light heavyweight champion Joey Maxim, and boxed a draw with the legendary Archie Moore. He retired with a record of 63 wins (14 by KO), 13 losses and 8 draws.

Perhaps in the high point of his career, Pastrano appeared on the cover of March 22, 1965, issue of Sports Illustrated with the caption reading "Light Heavyweight Willie Pastrano Ready to Defend His Title".

== Life after boxing ==
After he retired from boxing, Pastrano became a spokesman for a local Miami, Florida milk company. On August 30, 1966, in the Milwaukee Sentinel, it was reported that Pastrano had been secretly training for a comeback, but an auto injury had sidelined it.

In 1967, Pastrano became the official host of the Presidential Steak House in Miami Beach, Florida.

However, urged on by his good friend, singer Steve Alaimo, Pastrano embarked on a film career which spanned from 1967 to 1971.

In 1964, Pastrano appeared on the Jackie Gleason Show.

Pastrano's best regarded acting role was in the "B" motorcycle gang film, The Wild Rebels, which starred Steve Alaimo.

Pastrano said in a 1980 interview he was a heroin addict from 1966 to 1969. In the same interview, he claimed to have robbed to support his drug addiction.

He became a drifter. Owen Thomas helped him out in his time of need. He worked as a host in a restaurant in Reno, Nevada; a chip runner in Las Vegas, and a bouncer in a strip-club in Miami

His well-documented party life-style led to health problems, and Pastrano's film career ended. While living in Las Vegas in the early 1970s, he claimed to be training for a comeback when interviewed for the book, In This Corner.

Pastrano was reported to be boxing in Puerto Rico in 1972, but a fighter was using a name similar to the former champion, Willie Pastrana. Pastrano never made a comeback.

In 1980, Pastrano was the manager for pro-boxer, Chubby Johnson in New Orleans.

After many years of failing health, Pastrano died of liver cancer on December 6, 1997, at the age of 62.

== Professional boxing record ==
83 fights	62 wins	13 losses
By knockout	14	2
By decision	48	11
Draws	8	

No.	Result	Record	Opponent	Type	Round, time	Date	Location	Notes
83	Loss	62–13–8	José Torres	TKO	9 (15); 3:00	Mar 30, 1965	Madison Square Garden, New York City, New York, U.S.	Lost WBA, WBC, and The Ring light heavyweight titles
82	Win	62–12–8	Terry Downes	TKO	11 (15), 1:17	Nov 30, 1964	Kings Hall, Manchester, North West England, England	Retained WBA, WBC, and The Ring light heavyweight titles
81	Win	61–12–8	Gregorio Peralta	TKO	5 (15), 3:00	Apr 10, 1964	Municipal Auditorium, New Orleans, Louisiana, U.S.	Retained WBA, WBC, and The Ring light heavyweight titles
80	Win	60–12–8	Mike Holt	PTS	10	Nov 30, 1963	Rand Stadium, Johannesburg, Gauteng, South Africa	
79	Loss	59–12–8	Gregorio Peralta	UD	10	Sep 20, 1963	Miami Beach Auditorium, Miami Beach, Florida, U.S.	
78	Win	59–11–8	Ollie Wilson	UD	10	Aug 31, 1963	Jacksonville Coliseum, Jacksonville, Florida, U.S.	
77	Win	58–11–8	Harold Johnson	SD	15	Jun 1, 1963	Las Vegas Convention Center, Paradise, Nevada, U.S.	Won WBA, WBC, and The Ring light heavyweight titles
76	Win	57–11–8	Wayne Thornton	MD	10	May 4, 1963	Las Vegas Convention Center, Paradise, Nevada, U.S.	
75	Draw	56–11–8	Wayne Thornton	MD	10	Mar 23, 1963	Madison Square Garden, New York City, New York, U.S.	
74	Loss	56–11–7	Wayne Thornton	UD	10	Feb 9, 1963	Madison Square Garden, New York City, New York, U.S.	
73	Win	56–10–7	Rodolfo Diaz	SD	10	Sep 8, 1962	Miami Beach Auditorium, Miami Beach, Florida, U.S.	
72	Win	55–10–7	Billy Ryan	UD	10	Jun 25, 1962	Municipal Auditorium, New Orleans, Louisiana, U.S.	
71	Draw	54–10–7	Archie Moore	MD	10	May 28, 1962	Los Angeles Sports Arena, Los Angeles, California, U.S.	
70	Win	54–10–6	Tom McNeeley	UD	10	May 1, 1962	Boston Arena, Boston, Massachusetts, U.S.	
69	Draw	53–10–6	Lennart Risberg	PTS	12	Aug 6, 1961	Stockholm Olympic Stadium, Stockholm, Södermanland, Sweden	
68	Loss	53–10–5	Jesse Bowdry	UD	10	Dec 27, 1960	Miami Beach Auditorium, Miami Beach, Florida, U.S.	
67	Loss	53–9–5	Chic Calderwood	PTS	10	Sep 16, 1960	Kelvin Hall, Glasgow, Scotland	
66	Win	53–8–5	Sonny Ray	UD	10	Jun 1, 1960	Chicago Stadium, Chicago, Illinois, U.S.	
65	Win	52–8–5	Alonzo Johnson	UD	10	May 6, 1960	Fairgrounds Coliseum, Louisville, Kentucky, U.S.	
64	Win	51–8–5	George Kartalian	RTD	6 (10)	Apr 9, 1960	Bell Auditorium, Augusta, Georgia, U.S.	
63	Win	50–8–5	Jerry Luedee	UD	10	Jan 20, 1960	Miami Beach Auditorium, Miami Beach, Florida, U.S.	
62	Win	49–8–5	Charley Pavlis	UD	10	Dec 7, 1959	Fort Homer W. Hesterly Armory, Tampa, Florida, U.S.	
61	Win	48–8–5	Tom Davis	TKO	3 (10)	Aug 20, 1959	Chilhowee Park, Knoxville, Tennessee, U.S.	
60	Loss	47–8–5	Alonzo Johnson	UD	10	Jul 24, 1959	Freedom Hall State Fairground, Louisville, Kentucky, U.S.	
59	Loss	47–7–5	Joe Erskine	PTS	10	Feb 24, 1959	Wembley Stadium, London, England	
58	Loss	47–6–5	Brian London	TKO	5 (10)	Sep 30, 1958	Harringay Arena, London, England	
57	Win	47–5–5	Tommy Thompson	KO	4 (10), 2:31	Aug 25, 1958	City Auditorium, Columbus, Georgia, U.S.	
56	Win	46–5–5	Franco Cavicchi	PTS	10	Jun 15, 1958	Sports Palace, Bologna, Emilia-Romagna, Italy	
55	Win	45–5–5	Joe Bygraves	PTS	10	Apr 21, 1958	Granby Halls, Leicester, England	
54	Win	44–5–5	Brian London	PTS	10	Feb 25, 1958	Harringay Arena, London, England	
53	Win	43–5–5	Willi Besmanoff	UD	10	Nov 27, 1957	Miami Beach Auditorium, Miami Beach, Florida, U.S.	
52	Win	42–5–5	Dick Richardson	PTS	10	Oct 22, 1957	Harringay Arena, London, England	
51	Win	41–5–5	George Peyton	TKO	8 (10)	Sep 10, 1957	Miami Beach Auditorium, Miami Beach, Florida, U.S.	
50	Loss	40–5–5	Roy Harris	UD	10}	Jun 11, 1957	Sam Houston Coliseum, Houston, Texas, U.S.	
49	Win	40–4–5	Neal Welch	UD	10	May 14, 1957	Miami Beach Auditorium, Miami Beach, Florida, U.S.	
48	Win	39–4–5	John Holman	UD	10	Feb 20, 1957	State Fairgrounds, Louisville, Kentucky, U.S.	
47	Win	38–4–5	Charley Norkus	UD	10	Dec 26, 1956	Miami Beach Auditorium, Miami Beach, Florida, U.S.	
46	Win	37–4–5	Pat McMurtry	UD	10	Aug 24, 1956	Lincoln Bowl, Tacoma, Washington, U.S.	
45	Win	36–4–5	Chuck Spieser	SD	10	May 30, 1956	Municipal Auditorium, New Orleans, Louisiana, U.S.	
44	Win	35–4–5	Johnny Arthur	UD	10	Apr 4, 1956	Municipal Auditorium, New Orleans, Louisiana, U.S.	
43	Draw	34–4–5	Chuck Spieser	PTS	10	Jan 27, 1956	Miami Beach Auditorium, Miami Beach, Florida, U.S.	
42	Win	34–4–4	Rex Layne	UD	10	Dec 19, 1955	Municipal Auditorium, New Orleans, Louisiana, U.S.	
41	Win	33–4–4	Joey Rowan	UD	10	Nov 18, 1955	Madison Square Garden, New York City, New York, U.S.	
40	Win	32–4–4	Paddy Young	UD	10	Oct 3, 1955	Municipal Auditorium, New Orleans, Louisiana, U.S.	
39	Win	31–4–4	Chuck Spieser	UD	10	Jul 27, 1955	Chicago Stadium, Chicago, Illinois, U.S.	
38	Win	30–4–4	Joey Maxim	UD	10	Jun 28, 1955	Municipal Auditorium, New Orleans, Louisiana, U.S.	
37	Draw	29–4–4	Willie Troy	PTS	10	Apr 22, 1955	Chicago Stadium, Chicago, Illinois, U.S.	
36	Win	29–4–3	Al Andrews	UD	10	Mar 23, 1955	Chicago Stadium, Chicago, Illinois, U.S.	
35	Win	28–4–3	Tony Johnson	UD	10	Mar 1, 1955	Miami Beach Auditorium, Miami Beach, Florida, U.S.	
34	Win	27–4–3	Bobby Dykes	UD	10	Nov 23, 1954	Miami Beach Auditorium, Miami Beach, Florida, U.S.	
33	Win	26–4–3	Jackie LaBua	SD	10	Sep 14, 1954	Miami Beach Auditorium, Miami Beach, Florida, U.S.	
32	Win	25–4–3	Jimmy Martinez	PTS	10	Aug 24, 1954	Miami Beach Auditorium, Miami Beach, Florida, U.S.	
31	Win	24–4–3	Tommy Bazzano	TKO	8 (10)	Aug 9, 1954	Coliseum Arena, New Orleans, Louisiana, U.S.	
30	Win	23–4–3	Tommy Hatcher	KO	1 (10)	Jun 18, 1954	Abba Temple Auditorium, Mobile, Alabama, U.S.	
29	Win	22–4–3	Jacques Royer-Crecy	UD	10	Apr 12, 1954	Coliseum Arena, New Orleans, Louisiana, U.S.	
28	Win	21–4–3	Jimmy Martinez	UD	10	Mar 29, 1954	Coliseum Arena, New Orleans, Louisiana, U.S.	
27	Loss	20–4–3	Italo Scortichini	SD	10	Nov 30, 1953	Coliseum Arena, New Orleans, Louisiana, U.S.	
26	Win	20–3–3	Elmer Beltz	MD	8	Oct 5, 1953	Coliseum Arena, New Orleans, Louisiana, U.S.	
25	Draw	19–3–3	Elmer Beltz	PTS	10	Sep 22, 1953	Miami Beach Auditorium, Miami Beach, Florida, U.S.	
24	Loss	19–3–2	Del Flanagan	SD	8	Jul 14, 1953	Miami Beach Auditorium, Miami Beach, Florida, U.S.	
23	Loss	19–2–2	Johnny Cesario	MD	8	May 25, 1953	Coliseum Arena, New Orleans, Louisiana, U.S.	
22	Win	19–1–2	Chato Hernandez	UD	8	Apr 6, 1953	Coliseum Arena, New Orleans, Louisiana, U.S.	
21	Win	18–1–2	Roger Trevino	UD	8	Mar 16, 1953	Coliseum Arena, New Orleans, Louisiana, U.S.	
20	Win	17–1–2	Chick Boucher	TKO	3 (10), 1:08	Mar 3, 1953	Miami Beach Auditorium, Miami Beach, Florida, U.S.	
19	Win	16–1–2	Emerson Butcher	UD	8	Feb 24, 1953	Coliseum Arena, New Orleans, Louisiana, U.S.	
18	Win	15–1–2	Alfredo LaGrutta	UD	8	Jan 26, 1953	Coliseum Arena, New Orleans, Louisiana, U.S.	
17	Draw	14–1–2	Alvin Pellegrini	MD	8	Dec 15, 1952	Coliseum Arena, New Orleans, Louisiana, U.S.	
16	Win	14–1–1	Alvin Boudreaux	TKO	2 (6), 1:59	Nov 24, 1952	Coliseum Arena, New Orleans, Louisiana, U.S.	
15	Win	13–1–1	Alvin Pellegrini	UD	6	Nov 17, 1952	Coliseum Arena, New Orleans, Louisiana, U.S.	
14	Win	12–1–1	Lonnie Rylant	KO	3 (6), 1:44	Oct 14, 1952	Coliseum Arena, New Orleans, Louisiana, U.S.	
13	Loss	11–1–1	Alvin Pellegrini	PTS	6	Oct 6, 1952	Coliseum Arena, New Orleans, Louisiana, U.S.	
12	Win	11–0–1	Johnny Capitano	PTS	6	Sep 8, 1952	Coliseum Arena, New Orleans, Louisiana, U.S.	
11	Win	10–0–1	Sonny Luciano	PTS	8	Aug 19, 1952	Miami Beach Auditorium, Miami Beach, Florida, U.S.	
10	Win	9–0–1	Sonny Luciano	PTS	8	Aug 5, 1952	Miami Beach Auditorium, Miami Beach, Florida, U.S.	
9	Win	8–0–1	Jimmy Carter	KO	4 (6), 1:00	Jul 28, 1952	Sports Palace, Pensacola, Florida, U.S.	
8	Win	7–0–1	Al McCoy	KO	2 (6)	Jul 22, 1952	Miami Beach Auditorium, Miami Beach, Florida, U.S.	
7	Win	6–0–1	John Chaney	PTS	6	Jul 8, 1952	Miami Beach Auditorium, Miami Beach, Florida, U.S.	
6	Win	5–0–1	Buzz Brown	KO	2 (4), 2:56	Jul 1, 1952	Miami Beach Auditorium, Miami Beach, Florida, U.S.	
5	Draw	4–0–1	Alvin Pellegrini	PTS	4	Apr 21, 1952	Coliseum Arena, New Orleans, Louisiana, U.S.	
4	Win	4–0	Alvin Boudreaux	PTS	4	Apr 1, 1952	Coliseum Arena, New Orleans, Louisiana, U.S.	
3	Win	3–0	Jimmy Conino	PTS	4	Oct 1, 1951	Coliseum Arena, New Orleans, Louisiana, U.S.	
2	Win	2–0	Frankie Speed	PTS	4	Sep 17, 1951	Municipal Auditorium, New Orleans, Louisiana, U.S.	
1	Win	1–0	Domingo Rivera	PTS	4	Sep 10, 1951	Municipal Auditorium, New Orleans, Louisiana, U.S.	

== Titles in boxing ==
=== Major world titles ===
- WBA light heavyweight champion (175 lbs)
- WBC light heavyweight champion (175 lbs)

=== The Ring magazine titles ===
- The Ring light heavyweight champion (175 lbs)

=== Undisputed titles ===
- Undisputed light heavyweight champion

== See also ==
- List of light-heavyweight boxing champions

Sporting positions
World boxing titles
Preceded by Harold Johnson	WBA light heavyweight champion June 1, 1963 – March 30, 1965	Succeeded by José Torres
Preceded by Harold Johnson	WBC light heavyweight champion June 1, 1963 – March 30, 1965	Succeeded by José Torres
Preceded by Harold Johnson	The Ring light heavyweight champion June 1, 1963 – March 30, 1965	Succeeded by José Torres
Preceded by Harold Johnson	Undisputed light heavyweight champion June 1, 1963 – March 30, 1965	Succeeded by José Torres
