= Walter Neusel =

German boxer

Personal information
- Nickname: Der Blonde Tiger
- Nationality: German
- Born: Walter Neusel; 25 November 1907 Bochum, German Empire
- Died: 3 October 1964 (aged 56) West Berlin, West Germany
- Height: 1.87 m (6 ft 1 1/2 in)
- Weight: Heavyweight

Boxing career
- Stance: Orthodox

Boxing record
- Total fights: 90
- Wins: 68
- Win by KO: 36
- Losses: 13
- Draws: 9

Walter Neusel (25 November 1907 – 3 October 1964) was a German heavyweight boxer. During his career he held the distinction of being recognized as German Heavyweight Champion. Statistical boxing website BoxRec rates Neusel as the sixth best German boxer ever across all weight divisions.

== Professional career ==
Neusel turned professional in 1930, racking up a 32–0–2 record before experiencing his first lost against Belgian pugilist Pierre Charles via points decision. During this period, Neusel scored wins over top European heavyweight contenders Gipsy Daniels (twice) and Larry Gains. In 1933, Neusel followed his contemporary Max Schmeling to America, where he became popular due to his aggressive style. In 1934, he defeated King Levinsky and the future Hall of Famer Tommy Loughran. These accomplishments earned him a ranking as one of the Ring Magazine's Top 10 heavyweights, setting up a bout with Schmeling for European supremacy.

=== First bout with Schmeling ===
On 26 August 1934 in Hamburg came a very important match for European boxing, Neusel against Schmeling. The venue was the dirt track facility in the immediate vicinity of Hagenbeck Zoo, which boxing promoter Walter Rothenburg had rebuilt within a few weeks in a rushed manner. Though the audience figures vary from 90,000–102,000 it was unquestionably the largest number of spectators in German history. Neusel lost the match via ninth round technical knockout, putting up a valiant effort but ultimately being outclassed by Schmeling.

=== European contender ===
After the Schmeling fight, Neusel held another future Hall of Famer in Len Harvey to a 12 round draw. Following up with back-to-back victories over Welsh contender Jack Petersen. In 1935, Neusel returned to America to face former Heavyweight World Title holder Primo Carnera; losing the bout via fourth round knockout. He then returned to Europe and beat South African challenger Ben Foord twice, with both wins sandwiched around a loss to Tommy Farr.

=== World War II era & later career ===
In 1940, Neusel won the German Heavyweight title against Arno Kölblin in Berlin. He lost the title to Heinz Lazek in the latter part of 1940, but regained it against Adolf Heuser in 1942. He lost it for the last time against Hein ten Hoff in 1946. In 1948, Neusel had a rematch with arch-rival Schmeling, 14 years after the initial encounter. This time Neusel prevailed with a points decision victory over 12 rounds. Neusel retired after a knockout loss to Conny Rux in 1950. and died from a heart attack in 1964.

== Notable bouts ==
Result	Opponent	Type	Rd., Time	Date	Location	Notes
Loss	(West Germany) Conny Rux	KO	5 (10)	1950-03-18	(West Germany) Funkturmhalle, Westend, West Berlin	
Draw	(West Germany) Hein ten Hoff	PTS	12	1949-09-18	(West Germany) Reiterstadion, Düsseldorf, Nordrhein-Westfalen	
Win	(Allied-occupied Germany) Max Schmeling	PTS	10	1948-05-23	(Allied-occupied Germany) Sportplatz, Altona, Hamburg	
Loss	(Allied-occupied Germany) Hein ten Hoff	KO	7 (12)	1947-10-15	(Allied-occupied Germany) HSV Platz, Hamburg	For German BDB Heavyweight Title
Loss	(Allied-occupied Germany) Hein ten Hoff	PTS	12	1946-08-03	(Allied-occupied Germany) HSV Sportplatz Rothenbaum, Hamburg	Lost German BDB Heavyweight Title
Win	(Nazi Germany) Adolf Heuser	TKO	9 (12)	1942-09-06	(Nazi Germany) Deutschlandhalle, Charlottenburg, Hamburg	Won German BDB Heavyweight Title
Draw	(Nazi Germany) Adolf Heuser	PTS	12	1942-06-27	(Nazi Germany) Union Sportplatz, Hamburg	For German BDB Heavyweight Title
Loss	(Nazi Germany) Heinz Lazek	PTS	12	1941-10-26	(Nazi Germany) Deutschlandhalle, Charlottenburg, Hamburg	For German BDB Heavyweight Title
Win	(Nazi Germany) Arno Kölblin	PTS	10	1941-04-27	(Nazi Germany) Deutschlandhalle, Charlottenburg, Hamburg	
Win	(Nazi Germany) Adolf Heuser	TKO	9 (10)	1941-01-26	(Nazi Germany) Deutschlandhalle, Charlottenburg, Hamburg	
Loss	(Nazi Germany) Heinz Lazek	PTS	12	1940-11-03	(Nazi Germany) Sportpalast, Schoeneberg, Berlin	Lost German BDB Heavyweight Title
Win	(Nazi Germany) Arno Kölblin	PTS	12	1940-06-22	(Nazi Germany) Eisstadion, Friedrichshain, Berlin	Retained German BDB Heavyweight Title
Win	(Nazi Germany) Arno Kölblin	PTS	12	1938-11-11	(Nazi Germany) Deutschlandhalle, Charlottenburg, Hamburg	Won German BDB Heavyweight Title
Loss	(Nazi Germany) Heinz Lazek	PTS	15	1938-09-16	(Nazi Germany) Ice Rink, Vienna	For EBU Heavyweight Title
Win	(Nazi Germany) Heinz Lazek	PTS	12	1938-07-16	(Nazi Germany) Schwebenhalle, Stuttgart, Baden-Württemberg	
Win	(South Africa) Ben Foord	DQ	8 (12)	1938-04-16	(Nazi Germany) Hanseatenhalle, Hamburg	
Loss	(Wales) Tommy Farr	KO	3 (12)	1937-06-15	(United Kingdom) Harringay Arena, Harringay, London	
Win	(Wales) Jack Petersen	TKO	10 (12)	1937-02-01	(United Kingdom) Harringay Arena, Harringay, London	
Win	(South Africa) Ben Foord	PTS	15	1936-11-18	(United Kingdom) Harringay Arena, Harringay, London	
Loss	(Italy) Primo Carnera	TKO	4 (10))	1935-11-01	(United States) Madison Square Garden, New York, New York	
Win	(Wales) Jack Petersen	TKO	12 (12)	1935-06-25	(United Kingdom) Wembley Stadium, Wembley, London	
Win	(Wales) Jack Petersen	TKO	11 (15)	1935-02-04	(United Kingdom) Empire Pool, Wembley, London	
Draw	(United Kingdom) Len Harvey	PTS	12	1934-11-26	(United Kingdom) Empire Pool, Wembley, London	
Loss	(Germany) Max Schmeling	KO	9 (15)	1934-08-26	(Germany) Sandbahn Lokstedt, Hamburg	
Win	(United States) Tommy Loughran	SD	10	1934-05-04	(United States) Madison Square Garden, New York, New York	
Win	(United States) King Levinsky	PTS	10	1934-03-09	(United States) Madison Square Garden, New York, New York	
Win	(Wales) Gipsy Daniels	PTS	10	1932-11-26	(Germany) Festhalle, Frankfurt, Hessen	
Win	(Canada) Larry Gains	UD	10	1932-10-17	(France) Salle Wagram, Paris	
Win	(Wales) Gipsy Daniels	PTS	10	1931-07-31	(Germany) Sportplatz Allee Altona, Altona, Hamburg	

== Bibliography ==
- Schmeling, Max (1977). Erinnerungen. Frankfurt/Berlin: Ullstein. ISBN 978-3-5482-7508-6.

Awards and achievements
Preceded by Arno Kölblin	German BDB Heavyweight Champion; 11 November 1938 – 3 November 1940	Succeeded by Heinz Lazek
Preceded by Adolf Heuser	German BDB Heavyweight Champion; 27 June 1942 – 3 August 1946	Succeeded by Hein ten Hoff
