= Arno Kölblin =

German boxer

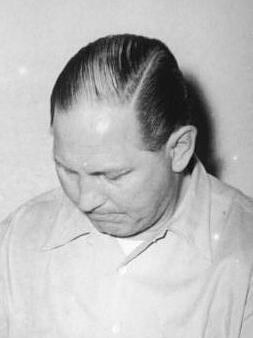
- Kölblin in 1955

Personal information
- Nationality: German
- Born: 9 October 1911 Berlin, Germany
- Died: 19 December 1998 (aged 87)
- Weight: Heavyweight

Boxing career

Boxing record
- Total fights: 78
- Wins: 50
- Win by KO: 20
- Losses: 20
- Draws: 8

Arno Kölblin (9 October 1911 – 19 December 1988) was a German boxer who was the heavyweight champion of Germany and Europe in the 1930s.

== Career ==
Born in Berlin the son of businessman Otto Kölblin and Hedwig Kölblin (née Richter), Kölblin turned professional shortly after leaving school. He made his debut on 12 March 1931 with a points win over Hans Bischoff. In July that year he stopped former German heavyweight champion Ludwig Haymann in the seventh round. These were the only two wins from his first seven fights. The mixed results continued into 1934, Kölblin suffering losses to Vincenz Hower, Motzi Spakow, but three straight wins between June and October that year, including a win over Hans Schönrath led to a German heavyweight title fight against Hower, the defending champion winning comfortably on points.

After a run of eight fights in which he only lost once (to Adolf Heuser), he challenged Hower in August 1936 for the German heavyweight title; Kölblin knocked Hower out in the tenth round to become German champion. He successfully defended the title against Werner Selle and Erwin Klein, and in March 1937 challenged Pierre Charles for the IBU European heavyweight title at the Deutschlandhalle, Charlottenburg. Kölblin won on points to add the European title to his German title.

He successfully defended his German title against Hower in May 1937, but after losing to Eddie Phillips in a non-title fight in November 1937, lost the European title in March 1938 to Heinz Lazek after being disqualified in the second round at the Sportpalast in Schoeneberg for repeated low blows. In November 1938, he also lost the German title, losing on points to Walter Neusel. In August 1939 he was set to fight Tommy Farr in Wales, but with tensions growing between the UK and Germany, the Welsh branch of the British Boxing Board of Control refused to recommend that the Ministry of Labour give him a permit to fight, prompting criticism from the German press, who saw it as a political decision. He beat Lazek in November 1939, and June 1940 challenged Neusel in an attempt to regain the German title, but Neusel again won on points.

Kölblin was out of the ring after November 1942 due to World War II, but returned to boxing after the war, winning eight of his ten post-war fights, but losing two, including an unsuccessful challenge for Hein ten Hoff's German title. His final fight was a fourth-round knockout of Heinz Klose in May 1950. He retired with a record of 50 wins from 78 fights, with 20 losses and 8 draws.

In the early 1950s, Kölblin worked as a coach in the German Democratic Republic. In 1956 he fled to West Germany, where he continued to work as a boxing trainer and later a manager.

Kölblin died on 19 December 1998, at the age of 87.
