= Jack Gardner (boxer) =

English boxer

Personal information
- Nationality: British
- Born: 6 November 1926 Market Harborough, England
- Died: 11 November 1978 (aged 52)
- Height: 6 ft 1 in (185 cm)
- Weight: Heavyweight

Boxing career
- Reach: 78 in (198 cm)
- Stance: Orthodox

Boxing record
- Total fights: 34
- Wins: 28
- Win by KO: 23
- Losses: 6

Poster of champion Jack Gardner

Jack Leonard Gardner (6 November 1926 – 11 November 1978) was a British heavyweight boxer. He was the Heavyweight Champion of Great Britain, the British Empire, and Europe. Gardner was a top ten contender for the Heavyweight Championship of the World and retired with a record of 28 wins, 23 by knockout, and 6 losses, a total of 34 fights.

== Early life ==
Jack Gardner was born on 6 November 1926 at Market Harborough, Leicestershire, England. He served in the Grenadier Guards in the British Army from 1945 to 1951. He earned the rank of Colour Sergeant by the age of 24, becoming one if the youngest Colour Sergeants in the Grenadier Guards to serve Queen Elizabeth II. It was during his time as a guardsman, Gardner began his amateur boxing career.

He won the ABA Heavyweight title, as well as the Army and Imperial Services Heavyweight Titles in 1948, representing Great Britain in the Olympic Games.

Gardner stood 6' 1", had a reach of 78 inches, and weighed anywhere from 200 to 220 pounds during his career.

== Boxing career ==
Gardner began his career as a professional boxer on 12 December 1948, in a novice tournament, winning all of his fights by knockout in the first round. He went 13 - 0 (13 KO's) his first year in the ring. Gardner defeated Johnny Williams after 12 rounds in the Fight of the Year in July 1950, becoming a contender.

On 14 November 1950 Jack Gardner defeated Bruce Woodcock for the Heavyweight Championship of Great Britain and the British Empire by TKO after 11 rounds. Afterwards, he defeated Jo Weidin for the European Heavyweight Championship by decision in March 1951 after 15 rounds. As the British and European Heavyweight Champion, Jack Gardner, had a record of 22 - 2 (19 KO's).

However, he lost his European Heavyweight Title in November 1951 by decision after 15 rounds to Hein ten Hoff, a 6' 5 boxer at Berlin, Germany. And in March 1952, he lost his British Heavyweight Title to Johnny Williams in a rematch by decision after 15 rounds. Afterwards, he retired from boxing with a record of 22 - 5 (19 KO's).

== Comeback, retirement and death ==
Gardner made his comeback in 1953 with five straight victories, knocking out the Italian heavyweight champion Uber Bacilieri and the French heavyweight champion Lucien Touzard. On 6 June 1955 Gardner knocked out Johnny Williams after 5 rounds in a title eliminator for the British Heavyweight Titles.

However, due to an injury, he never was set to face Don Cockell, therefore never getting his title shot. Afterwards, he defeated Kitione Lave after 10 rounds by decision, the only fight in which he was ever knocked down, but lost by TKO in the second round due to cuts to Joe Bygraves. At the age of 29, Jack Gardner retired with a record of 28 wins, 23 by knockout, and 6 losses, 2 by TKO due to cuts.

Gardner retired to his farm in Market Harborough, England, and died at age 52 on 11 November 1978 from a brain tumor.
