= Heinz Lazek =

German boxer

Personal information
- Nationality: (Austria) Austrian (Germany) German
- Born: Heinz Lazek; 17 October 1911 Vienna, Austria
- Died: 26 July 1986 (aged 74)
- Weight: Light heavyweight Heavyweight

Boxing career
- Stance: Orthodox

Boxing record
- Total fights: 64
- Wins: 48
- Win by KO: 21
- Losses: 8
- Draws: 8

Heinz Lazek (17 October 1911 – 26 July 1986) was an Austrian and German professional boxer. He fought 64 times between 1932 and 1950; winning 48 (21 by knockout), losing 8 and drawing 8. During his career Lazek won the EBU title at light heavyweight and heavyweight.

== Professional career ==
Lazek made his professional debut in June 1932, winning a four-round points decision against Sandor Kunstzler. He remained undefeated over the next three years. Although he fought the majority of his early bouts in his hometown of Vienna, he also travelled to Paris and Prague to compete. His undefeated streak was brought to an end in June 1935 when he lost to Adolf Witt over ten rounds.

He won the light heavyweight title in September 1935 after the champion, Merlo Preciso, was disqualified in the thirteenth round. Following two successful defences of his title, against Rienus De Boer and Emilien Ollivon, Lazek was beaten by Gustave Roth via a fifteen rounds points decision in September 1936. All four of his light heavyweight title fights took place in Vienna. Having remained undefeated over his next nine bouts, Lazek was able to challenge the EBU heavyweight champion, Arno Kölblin, in March 1938. The fight, which took place in Berlin, Koelblin's hometown, was awarded to Lazek after the champion was disqualified in the second round. Lazek returned to Vienna to successfully defend his title against Sante De Leo and Walter Neusel, both fifteen round points decisions, before a further defence in Berlin, where he beat Karel Sys over fifteen rounds. In March 1939 Lazek suffered a fifth round knockout loss against Adolf Heuser, bringing his title reign to an end.

Although Lazek never fought for a European championship again, he won the German BDB heavyweight title in November 1940 and successfully defended it once before losing for a second time to Heuser. After a further loss to Gustav Thiess in March 1942, Lazek did not fight again until April 1947. In his first fight after an inactive period of five years he suffered a first-round knockout loss to Olle Tandberg. Lazek fought for a final time in September 1950, losing via a second round technical knockout to Jo Weidin.

== See also ==
- List of European Boxing Union heavyweight champions
- List of European Boxing Union light heavyweight champions
