= Adolf Heuser =

German boxer (1907–1988)

Personal information
- Nicknames: Bulldog of the Rhine, The Bonn Tornado
- Nationality: German
- Born: 3 October 1907 Buschdorf, Bonn, German Empire
- Died: 19 November 1988 (aged 81) Bonn, West Germany
- Height: 173 cm (5 ft 8 in)
- Weight: Light heavyweight, heavyweight

Boxing career

Boxing record
- Total fights: 128
- Wins: 88
- Win by KO: 44
- Losses: 21
- Draws: 17
- No contests: 1

Adolf Heuser (3 October 1907 – 19 November 1988) was a German boxer, who was the champion of Germany and Europe at both light heavyweight and heavyweight, and International Boxing Union (IBU) world champion at light heavyweight.

== Career ==
Born in Bonn to a bricklayer father, Heuser was one of sixteen children. He had thirty amateur fights before making his professional debut on 2 August 1929 at light heavyweight with a points win over former European champion Fernand Delarge. In November 1930 he beat Dutch champion Piet Brand, and in January 1931 challenged for Ernst Pistulla's German light heavyweight title, the fight ending in a draw. After seven straight wins, including victories over former French champion Moise Bouquillon, former Belgian champion Jack Etienne, and reigning Belgian champion Gustave Limousin, he faced Pistulla again in September that year, with both the German and European light heavyweight titles at stake. The fight again ended in a draw.

Heuser travelled to the United States in October 1931 for a series of fights. After being unbeaten in his first twenty fights, he suffered his first defeat in December when he lost a points decision to Patsy Perroni in Cleveland. He won all of his remaining fights on the US trip, before returning to Germany after suffering an ear injury.

In June 1932, Heuser knocked out José Martínez Valero in the first round in Valencia to take the vacant IBU European light heavyweight title.

Later that year he returned to the US for another series of fights, and after five straight victories, including a decision win over NBA world champion George Nichols, in March 1933 he challenged Maxie Rosenbloom for the NYSAC world light heavyweight title at Madison Square Garden; Rosenbloom beat a tired Heuser by unanimous decision, inflicting only the second defeat of Heuser's career. Heuser went on to lose his last three fights of his second spell in the US.

Back in Germany, Heuser won four fights before challenging Adolf Witt in August 1934 for the German (BDB) light heavyweight title, the fight ending in a draw. Over the next three years, Heuser beat Hans Schönrath and Arno Kölblin, his only defeats in this period in over thirty fights coming at the hands of Merlo Preciso and Karel Sys. In August 1937 he again challenged Witt for the German title, this time knocking him out in the eighth round to become German champion. In February 1938 he beat Sys on points, and the following month stopped Gustave Roth in the seventh round to add the IBU world and European titles. He had been due to fight John Henry Lewis for the NYSAC world title, but the fight was cancelled after the NYSAC controversially stripped Lewis of the title. Instead, he made a successful defence of his European title against Preciso in September 1938.

He moved up to heavyweight and in March 1939 beat Heinz Lazek to become European heavyweight champion. Heuser was initially ordered to defend this European title against Italian champion Sante De Leo (who had previously accepted a challenge to face Lazek), which prompted the German authorities to threaten to withdraw from the IBU in protest, but in July 1939 Heuser faced Max Schmeling in front of 70,000 people at the Adolf-Hitler-Kampfbahn, Stuttgart, with the German and European titles at stake; Schmeling knocked him out in the first round. Heuser remained unconscious in the ring for some time, and needed artificial respiration to revive him.

The following month, Heuser fought Preciso in what should have been a defence of his European light heavyweight title, and although he won the fight, he had lost the title at the weigh-in after failing to make the weight.

In March 1940 he challenged Jean Kreitz for the German title; Kreitz was controversially declared the winner, but the fight was declared a no contest the next day. The two fought again for the title in September, this time with Kreitz stopping Heuser in the eighth round.

Heuser moved back up to heavyweight, and after losing to Walter Neusel, a draw with Lazek and a win over Kölblin led to a challenge for Lazek's German heavyweight title in February 1942; Heuser knocked Lazek out in the third round to become German champion once again. He retained the title with a drawn fight against Neusel in June, but in September Neusel stopped him in the ninth round to take the title.

Heuser suffered from depression and was left impoverished by World War II, in which his house was destroyed, and although he never fought for a title again, he continued until February 1949, his final fight a loss to Helmut Janke, having only won one of his last twelve fights, subsequently retiring at the age of 41.

He spent the rest of his life in a psychiatric hospital, spending some time working as a volunteer in a restaurant in Bonn.

Heuser died on 19 November 1988 in the Rheinische Landeskliniken in Bonn, at the age of 81.

A road in Bonn, the Adolf-Heuser-Weg, was named after him in 1997.
