= Edewecht =

- Municipality
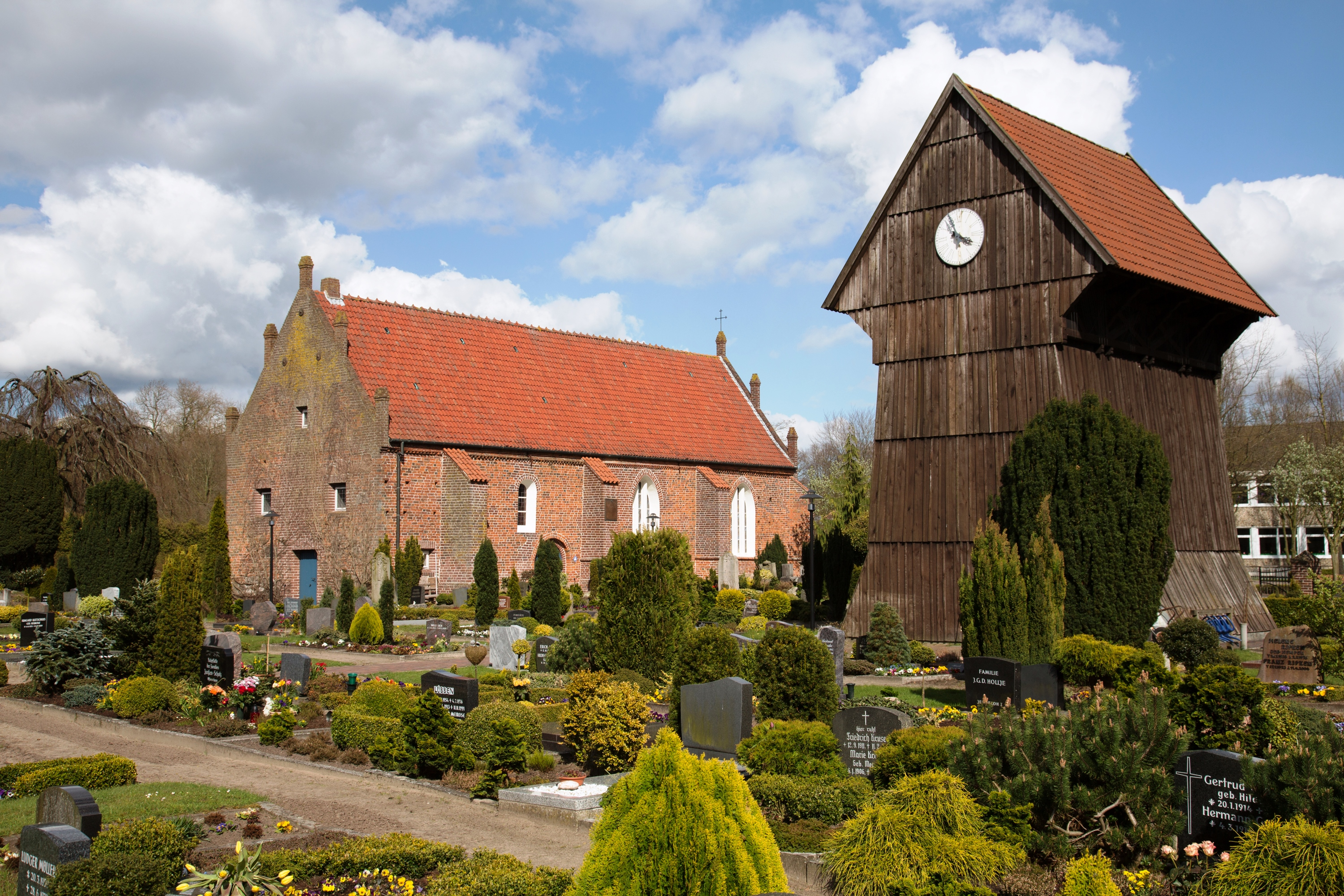
- Church of Saint Nicholas

- Flag Coat of arms

- Location of Edewecht within Ammerland district
- Interactive map of Edewecht
- Location within Germany Location within Lower Saxony
- Coordinates: 53°07′33″N 07°58′57″E
- Country: Germany
- State: Lower Saxony
- District: Ammerland
- Subdivisions: 15 districts

Government
  - Mayor (2021–26): Petra Knetemann (Ind.)

Area
  - Total: 113.85 km^{2} (43.96 sq mi)
- Elevation: 6 m (20 ft)

Population (2025-12-31)
  - Total: 22,389
  - Density: 196.65/km^{2} (509.33/sq mi)
- Time zone: UTC+01:00 (CET)
  - Summer (DST): UTC+02:00 (CEST)
- Postal codes: 26188
- Dialling codes: 04405
- Vehicle registration: WST
- Website: www.edewecht.de

Edewecht (German pronunciation: [ˈeːdəˌvɛçt]; Low German: Erwech) is a municipality in the Ammerland district, in Lower Saxony, Germany. It is situated approximately 15 kilometres (9 miles) west of Oldenburg.

== Villages and populations ==
- Friedrichsfehn Nord 1,747
- Friedrichsfehn Süd 3,185
- Husbäke 1,005 (known for the bog bodies found there; see: List of bog bodies)
- Jeddeloh I 1,101
- Jeddeloh II 1,333
- Kleefeld 439
- Klein Scharrel 1,229
- Nord Edewecht I 2,246
- Nord Edewecht II 2,548
- Osterscheps 1,604
- Portsloge 1,962
- Süddorf 608
- Süd Edewecht 2,256
- Westerscheps 554
- Wildenloh 805
- Wittenberge 386

total: 23,008

- Edewecht only 7,050
- Friedrichsfehn only 4,932

Source: website of the Edewecht Municipality.

Date: June 30, 2020.

The population figures include people who have a second home in Edewecht besides a dwelling elsewhere, and legally residing foreigners.

== History ==
Edewecht was the scene of severe fights during the last weeks of the Second World War. Coming from Friesoythe in the south, on April 17, 1945, Canadian troops had to conquer Edewecht in fierce house-by-house fighting against fanatic German paratroopers and other soldiers. The famous German artist Joseph Beuys, who was a young man in those days, was one of the Wehrmacht paratroopers defending Edewecht, and got injured on April 27 during battle.

This battle was the fifth time that Edewecht was destroyed in a war. The first four times were in the 15th and 16th centuries. Edewecht had been a border watch location between Eastern Frisia and the County of Oldenburg for many centuries.

== Twin towns ==
Edewecht is twinned with:

- Krosno, Poland
- Sátoraljaújhely, Hungary
- Wusterhausen/Dosse, Brandenburg, Germany

== Notable people ==
- Hein ten Hoff (1919–2003), German boxer
