= Don Cockell =

English boxer

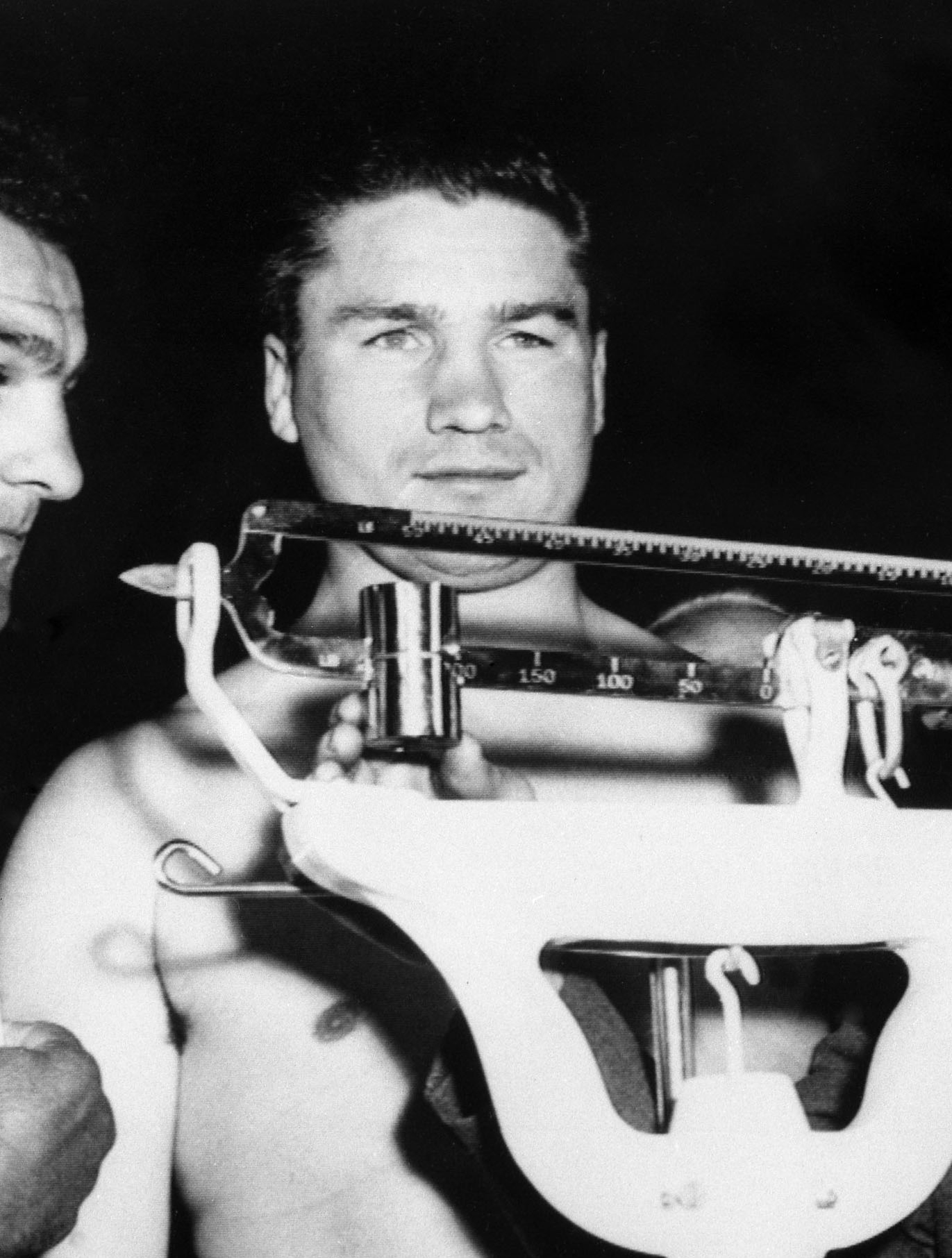
- Cockell in 1955, at the weigh in for his match against Rocky Marciano

Personal information
- Nationality: British
- Born: Donald John Cockell; 22 September 1928 Balham, London, England
- Died: 18 July 1983 (aged 54) Tooting, London, England
- Height: 180 cm (5 ft 11 in)
- Weight: Light heavyweight Heavyweight

Boxing career
- Reach: 180 cm (71 in)
- Stance: Orthodox

Boxing record
- Total fights: 81
- Wins: 66
- Win by KO: 38
- Losses: 14
- Draws: 1
- No contests: 0

Donald John Cockell (22 September 1928 – 18 July 1983) was an English boxer who competed from 1946 to 1956. One of the most well known boxers from the UK during the era, Cockell held the British and European light heavyweight titles, and later moved up in weight to become the British and Commonwealth heavyweight champion. He is most famous for fighting Rocky Marciano for the world heavyweight championship.

Over the course of Cockell's career he defeated a number of the top heavyweights of the time, including Roland La Starza, Harry Matthews (three times), Tommy Farr, Freddie Beshore, Johnny Arthur, Johnny Williams and Uber Bacilieri. In his earlier incarnation as a Light Heavyweight he defeated top contenders such as Nick Barone, Albert Yvel, Lloyd Marshall and Albert Finch, holding regional titles in both weight incarnations.

== Early life ==
His full name was Donald John Cockell and he was born on 22 September 1928 in Balham, London, the son of Mary Cockell, a domestic servant from Battersea. He never knew his father. He was a blacksmith by trade, and as a result developed a strong physique. He began boxing in fairground booths and soon rose through the amateur ranks until he was ready to turn professional in 1946.

== Professional career ==
=== Light-heavywight ===
Cockell had his first professional fight on 26 June 1946 against Trevor Lowder and won it by a knockout in the fifth round. He won 24 of his first 26 fights (suffering his first two losses to Jock Taylor). From there continued to build up an impressive fighting record marred by the occasional defeat.

In 1950 Cockell entered a brief tournament to crown a new British light-heavyweight champion, recently vacated due to the retirement of Freddie Mills. Cockell defeated Jimmy Carroll in an eliminator match (avenging a previous loss to him in the process) before facing Mark Hart on 17 October at Harringay Arena. Cockell won the BBBofC title after scoring a knockout in the fourteenth round.

Cockell fought and won two more fights against future Hall of Famer Lloyd Marshal, before challenging the Frenchman Albert Yvel for his European light-heavyweight title. The bout took place on 27 March 1951 at Earls Court, London, and Cockell won the title by scoring a technical knockout in the sixth round.

Cockell had two more wins before defending his British and European titles against Albert Finch, who had previously been British welterweight champion. The bout was held on 16 October 1951, at Harringay Arena, and Cockell won by a knockout in the seventh round.

Cockell decisively lost his next fight against the American heavyweight Jimmy Slade. Fighting at Harringay Arena, Cockell was knocked down twice in the first round, once in the second, and twice more in the fourth. The referee then stopped the fight. Cockell followed this defeat with a points win against Italian light-heavyweight Renato Tontini, despite being knocked down twice in the second round.

Cockell then fought against Randolph Turpin, who the year before, had become one of the few to defeat Sugar Ray Robinson, becoming world middleweight champion as a result before losing his title in the rematch. Cockell was defending his British title, and both fighters were contesting the vacant Commonwealth light-heavyweight title. The bout was at the White City Stadium on 10 June 1952. Cockell was knocked down three times during the fight and lost on a technical knockout in the eleventh round. One of the reasons for the defeat was the difficulty that Cockell had in making the weight for light-heavyweight fights. He therefore decided to fight subsequently as a heavyweight.

=== Heavyweight ===
Cockell found success at heavyweight, and in his next three heavyweight fights, all were won by technical knockouts. The third one was against the Welshman, Tommy Farr, who had been an excellent heavyweight, fighting against the great Joe Louis, but who was now at the end of his career, and although experienced, had aged quite a bit.

The fight against Farr was a final eliminator for the British heavyweight title, and so put Cockell in line for a title challenge against the holder Johnny Williams. The bout for the British and Commonwealth titles was held at Harringay Arena on 12 May 1953, and Cockell won on points over fifteen rounds.

Cockell then had two more wins before defending his Commonwealth title against Johnny Arthur in Johannesburg, South Africa. He won the fight on points after fifteen rounds.

In 1954, Cockell moved rapidly up the heavyweight rankings by scoring four wins against top rated American fighters. He first defeated heavyweight challenger Roland La Starza on points at Earls Court Arena, then won three close successive victories over the highly rated Harry (Kid) Matthews, the second fight was held at the White City Stadium, and the first and third at Sicks' Stadium, Seattle.

These victories put him in line for a title fight against undefeated heavyweight world champion Rocky Marciano. This was the first British world title bid since Tommy Farr had fought Joe Louis in 1937.

=== World heavyweight title fight ===
On 16 May 1955, Cockell fought Marciano for the world heavyweight title at Kezar Stadium in San Francisco, CA. Cockell was a 10–1 underdog and weighed 14 st 9 lbs against Marciano's 13 st 7 lbs, coming into the fight weighing 205 pounds to Rocky's 189. For the first three rounds the fight was fairly even, but as it progressed further Cockell began to take more and more punishment, without being able to hurt Marciano much. Cockell ended the eighth round hanging through the ropes after withstanding a huge beating. Marciano won the fight by TKO 54 seconds into round nine after Cockell had been knocked down twice, for counts of eight and seven. After the fight, Marciano stated, "He's got a lot of guts. I don't think I ever hit anyone else any more often or harder."

Many boxing fans in Britain felt that Marciano employed unfair tactics, such as hitting after the bell and low punches, but although the British Boxing Board of Control protested, Cockell himself made no complaints.

In covering the fight for Sports Illustrated, Budd Schulberg wrote in the 30 May 1955 edition, "Except for the technicality of wearing eight-ounce gloves, Don Cockell's stand against Rocky Marciano in the fading daylight hours of a cool San Francisco sunlit day was a glorious—or appalling—throwback to this pre-Marquess of Queensberry condition. This was a bare-knuckle brawl with gloves—and not a pleasant sight either—as an uncouth, merciless, uncontrolled and truly vicious fighter (the unbeaten Champion Marciano) wore down an ox-legged, resolute fat man who came into the ring with the honor of the British Empire weighing heavily—and consciously—on his massive, blubbery shoulders. He had promised his Union Jack supporters that he would not let them down, and the first words he mumbled through swollen lips after his fearful beating in nine rounds were an apology to his fellow countrymen for not having done better."

Jack Gallagher of the Oakland Tribune praised Cockell's brave effort, writing, "The fight was all Rocky's from the beginning. The Englishman showed amazing capacity for soaking up punishment."

=== Aftermath ===
The title fight had taken much out of Cockell, and he lost his subsequent two fights. In September 1955 he lost to the Cuban contender Nino Valdes at the White City Stadium by a technical knockout in the third round. He weighed 15 st 6 lbs for the fight. In April 1956 he was knocked out in the second round by Kitione Lave, known as the "Tongan Terror". That was his final fight. In May 1956 he was stripped of his Commonwealth title and in July he surrendered his British title and declared his retirement.

Cockell sued the Daily Mail after the newspaper had described him as being 'overweight and flabby' for his last fight, and not giving his all. He received £7,500 damages with costs.

== Professional boxing record ==
81 fights	66 wins	14 losses
By knockout	38	9
By decision	27	4
By disqualification	1	1
Draws	1	

No.	Result	Record	Opponent	Type	Round, time	Date	Location	Notes
81	Loss	66–14–1	Kitione Lave	KO	2 (10)	24 Apr 1956	Earls Court Arena, London, England	
80	Loss	66–13–1	Niño Valdés	RTD	3 (10)	13 Sep 1955	White City Stadium, London, England	
79	Loss	66–12–1	Rocky Marciano	TKO	9 (15), 0:54	16 May 1955	Kezar Stadium, San Francisco, California, U.S.	For NYSAC, NBA and The Ring heavyweight titles
78	Win	66–11–1	Harry Matthews	RTD	7 (10)	31 Jul 1954	Sick's Stadium, Seattle, Washington, U.S.	
77	Win	65–11–1	Harry Matthews	PTS	10	1 Jun 1954	White City Stadium, London, England	
76	Win	64–11–1	Roland La Starza	PTS	10	30 Mar 1954	Earls Court Arena, London, England	
75	Win	63–11–1	Johnny Arthur	PTS	15	30 Jan 1954	Rand Stadium, Johannesburg, South Africa	Retained Commonwealth British Empire heavyweight title
74	Win	62–11–1	Uber Baccilieri	PTS	10	5 Oct 1953	Granby Halls, Leicester, England	
73	Win	61–11–1	Harry Matthews	SD	10	7 Aug 1953	Sick's Stadium, Seattle, Washington, U.S.	
72	Win	60–11–1	Johnny Williams	PTS	15	12 May 1953	Harringay Arena, London, England	Won British and Commonwealth British Empire heavyweight titles
71	Win	59–11–1	Tommy Farr	TKO	7 (12)	9 Mar 1953	Ice Rink, Nottingham, England	
70	Win	58–11–1	Frank Bell	TKO	8 (10), 2:20	4 Nov 1952	Royal Albert Hall, London, England	
69	Win	57–11–1	Paddy Slavin	TKO	2 (10), 1:29	14 Oct 1952	Streatham Ice Rink, London, England	
68	Loss	56–11–1	Randolph Turpin	TKO	11 (15)	10 Jun 1952	White City Stadium, London, England	Lost British light-heavyweight title; For vacant Commonwealth British Empire light-heavyweight title
67	Win	56–10–1	Renato Tontini	PTS	10	20 May 1952	Harringay Arena, London, England	
66	Loss	55–10–1	Jimmy Slade	TKO	4 (10), 2:39	4 Dec 1951	Harringay Arena, London, England	
65	Win	55–9–1	Albert Finch	KO	7 (15), 0:45	16 Oct 1951	Harringay Arena, London, England	Retained British and European light-heavyweight titles
64	Win	54–9–1	Nick Barone	KO	6 (10)	5 Jun 1951	White City Stadium, London, England	
63	Win	53–9–1	Freddie Beshore	PTS	10	24 Apr 1951	Harringay Arena, London, England	
62	Win	52–9–1	Albert Yvel	TKO	6 (15)	27 Mar 1951	Earls Court Empress Hall, London, England	Won European light-heavyweight title
61	Win	51–9–1	Lloyd Marshall	KO	1 (10), 0:35	27 Feb 1951	Harringay Arena, London, England	
60	Win	50–9–1	Lloyd Marshall	DQ	7 (10), 1:10	14 Nov 1950	Earls Court Arena, London, England	Marshall disqualified for a low blow
59	Win	49–9–1	Mark Hart	KO	14 (15), 2:50	17 Oct 1950	Harringay Arena, London, England	Won vacant British light-heavyweight title
58	Win	48–9–1	Jimmy Carroll	RTD	7 (12)	4 Apr 1950	Royal Albert Hall, London, England	
57	Win	47–9–1	Lloyd Barnett	PTS	8	14 Mar 1950	Royal Albert Hall, London, England	
56	Loss	46–9–1	Aaron Wilson	PTS	8	28 Feb 1950	Harringay Arena, London, England	
55	Win	46–8–1	Georges Rogiers	PTS	8	13 Feb 1950	Granby Halls, Leicester, England	
54	Loss	45–8–1	Aaron Wilson	KO	6 (8)	24 Jan 1950	Earls Court Empress Hall, London, England	
53	Win	45–7–1	André Lefranc	TKO	5 (8)	17 Jan 1950	Streatham Ice Rink, London, England	
52	Win	44–7–1	Charlie Collet	TKO	1 (8), 1:35	20 Dec 1949	Corn Exchange, Reading, England	
51	Win	43–7–1	Don Mogard	PTS	8	31 Oct 1949	Granby Halls, Leicester, England	
50	Win	42–7–1	Gabriel Bigotte	KO	1 (8)	11 Oct 1949	Harringay Arena, London, England	
49	Win	41–7–1	Bert Gilroy	PTS	8	13 Jun 1949	Granby Halls, Leicester, England	
48	Loss	40–7–1	Jimmy Carroll	DQ	5 (8)	11 Apr 1949	Ice Stadium, Nottingham, England	Cockell disqualified for a low blow
47	Win	40–6–1	Paddy Slavin	PTS	8	29 Mar 1949	Earls Court Empress Hall, London, England	
46	Win	39–6–1	Mark Hart	PTS	8	7 Feb 1949	Harringay Arena, London, England	
45	Win	38–6–1	Lloyd Barnett	PTS	8	31 Jan 1949	Granby Halls, Leicester, England	
44	Win	37–6–1	Doug Richards	KO	5 (8)	7 Dec 1948	Corn Exchange, Reading, England	
43	Win	36–6–1	Johnny Barton	PTS	8	29 Nov 1948	Cossington Street Baths, Leicester, England	
42	Win	35–6–1	Gene Fowler	PTS	8	25 Oct 1948	Grand Pier Pavilion, Weston-super-Mare, England	
41	Loss	34–6–1	Johnny Barton	PTS	8	11 Oct 1948	Granby Halls, Leicester, England	
40	Win	34–5–1	Henry Palmer	KO	5 (6)	13 Sep 1948	Corn Exchange, Newbury, England	
39	Win	33–5–1	Gene Fowler	PTS	6	6 Sep 1948	Southampton, Hampshire, England	
38	Loss	32–5–1	Johnny Williams	TKO	2 (8), 3:00	27 Jul 1948	Embassy Rink, Birmingham, England	
37	Win	32–4–1	Trevor Burt	KO	1 (6), 1:47	19 Jul 1948	Southampton, Hampshire, England	
36	Win	31–4–1	Dave Goodwin	TKO	2 (8)	5 Jul 1948	Ice Rink, Nottingham, England	
35	Win	30–4–1	Battling Joe Igo	RTD	4 (8), 3:00	14 Jun 1948	Winter Gardens, Weston-super-Mare, England	
34	Win	29–4–1	Johnny Williams	PTS	8	18 May 1948	Highfield Road, Coventry, England	
33	Win	28–4–1	Koffi Kiteman	TKO	5 (8)	10 May 1948	Ice Rink, Nottingham, England	
32	Win	27–4–1	Paddy Roche	TKO	3 (8)	12 Apr 1948	Corn Exchange, Newbury, England	
31	Win	26–4–1	Gene Fowler	RTD	3 (6), 3:00	8 Mar 1948	Baths Hall, Swindon, England	
30	Win	25–4–1	George Barratt	KO	1 (6)	23 Feb 1948	Corn Exchange, Newbury, England	
29	Win	24–4–1	Jimmy Carroll	KO	4 (8)	17 Feb 1948	Assembly Rooms, Tunbridge Wells, England	
28	Loss	23–4–1	Reg Spring	PTS	8	4 Feb 1948	Caledonian Road Baths, London, England	
27	Draw	23–3–1	Jimmy Carroll	PTS	8	Jan 12, 1948	Town Hall, High Wycombe, England	
26	Win	23–3	Reg Spring	TKO	5 (8)	18 Nov 1947	Town Hall, High Wycombe, England	
25	Loss	22–3	Dave Goodwin	RTD	7 (9), 3:00	11 Aug 1947	Drill Hall, Yeovil, England	Contest was scheduled for 9 rounds as Cockell was under 19 years of age
24	Win	22–2	Reg Spring	PTS	10	4 Aug 1947	Kettering Cricket Ground, Kettering, England	
23	Win	21–2	Trevor Burt	TKO	10 (10)	28 Jul 1947	Corn Exchange, Reading, England	
22	Win	20–2	Paddy Roche	PTS	8	21 Jul 1947	Grand Pier Pavilion, Weston-super-Mare, England	
21	Win	19–2	Arthur Sadd	PTS	6	7 Jul 1947	Corn Exchange, Reading, England	
20	Win	18–2	Matt Hardy	KO	7 (8)	23 Jun 1947	Grand Pier Pavilion, Weston-super-Mare, England	
19	Win	17–2	Ronnie Croad	KO	3 (6)	9 Jun 1947	Wembley Town Hall, London, England	
18	Win	16–2	Harold Anthony	KO	4 (8)	3 May 1947	Corn Exchange, Newbury, England	
17	Win	15–2	Harold Anthony	PTS	10	27 Jan 1946	Kettering Baths Hall, Kettering, England	
16	Win	14–2	Jimmy Carroll	KO	5 (10)	20 Jan 1947	Corn Hall, Cirencester, England	
15	Loss	13–2	Jock Taylor	KO	6 (6)	6 Jan 1947	Town Hall, High Wycombe, England	
14	Win	13–1	Battling Joe Igo	TKO	4 (8)	16 Dec 1946	Kettering, Northamptonshire, England	
13	Win	12–1	Jimmy Carroll	PTS	6	2 Dec 1946	Town Hall, High Wycombe, England	
12	Win	11–1	Reg Spring	PTS	10	25 Nov 1946	Corn Hall, Cirencester, England	
11	Win	10–1	Paddy Roche	PTS	10	23 Nov 1946	Dening's Hangar, Chard, England	
10	Win	9–1	Frank Johnson	KO	2 (8)	4 Nov 1946	Epsom Baths, Epsom, England	
9	Win	8–1	Harry O'Grady	PTS	6	14 Oct 1946	Municipal Baths, Epsom, England	
8	Loss	7–1	Jock Taylor	PTS	8	10 Oct 1946	Watford Town Hall, Watford, England	
7	Win	7–0	Jimmy Sales	KO	2 (8)	7 Oct 1948	Town Hall, High Wycombe, England	
6	Win	6–0	Trevor Lowder	KO	3 (8)	23 Sep 1946	Rugby Co-operative Hall, Rugby, England	
5	Win	5–0	Harry Lawrence	TKO	2 (8)	9 Sep 1946	Town Hall, High Wycombe, England	
4	Win	4–0	Ron Baker	KO	3 (8)	28 Aig 1946	Watford Town Hall, Watford, England	
3	Win	3–0	Frank Baldwin	TKO	2 (8)	31 Jul 1946	Town Hall, High Wycombe, England	
2	Win	2–0	Sid Watts	TKO	1 (8)	18 Jul 1946	Watford Town Hall, Watford, England	
1	Win	1–0	Trevor Lowder	KO	5 (8)	26 Jun 1946	Town Hall, High Wycombe, England	

== Retirement ==
He tried various jobs including running a farm, being a publican, and running a haulage firm based at Ninfield in East Sussex. By 1975 he was working as a craftsman blacksmith in the permanent way machine shops at the London Underground Lillie Bridge Depot in Fulham. His last job was as an emergency maintenance man. He died of cancer on 18 July 1983 at a hospital in Tooting. He was married to Patricia Mary Cockell and had a son Patrick and Brother (David Hammond) worked with him

== See also ==
- List of British heavyweight boxing champions
- List of British light-heavyweight boxing champions

== Sources ==
- Boxing record for Don Cockell from BoxRec (registration required)
- Biography, Oxford Dictionary of National Biography
