= Back Lane drill hall, Newtown =

Back Lane drill hall
- Newtown, Powys
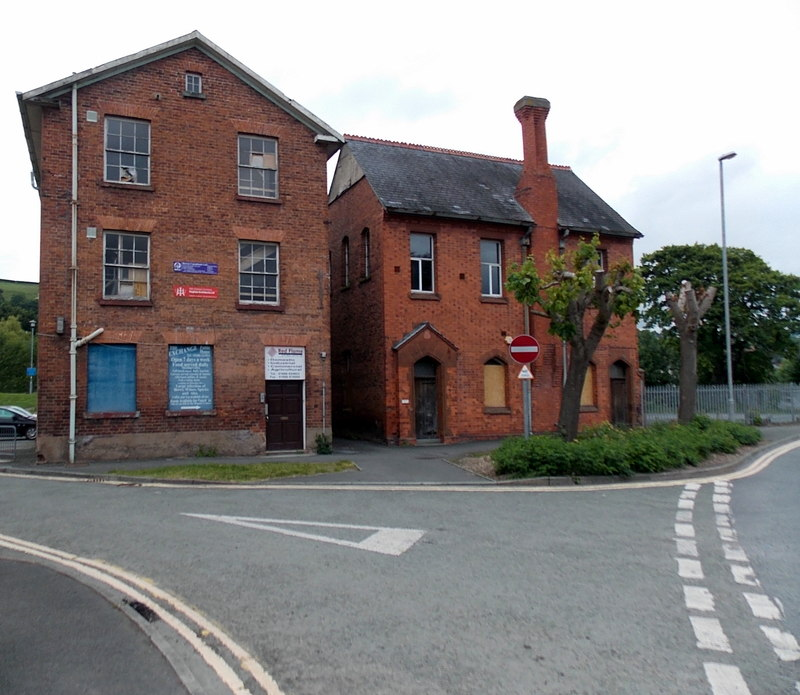
- Back Lane drill hall (on the left)

Site information
- Type: Drill hall

Location
- Location in Powys
- Coordinates: 52.51633°N 3.31763°W

Site history
- Built: 1855
- Built for: War Office
- In use: 1855–1955

The Back Lane drill hall is a former military installation in Newtown, Wales.

== History ==
The building was designed as the headquarters of the 5th Volunteer Battalion, The South Wales Borderers and was completed in 1897. This unit evolved to become the 7th Battalion, The Royal Welch Fusiliers in 1908. The battalion was mobilised at the drill hall in August 1914 before being deployed to Gallipoli and ultimately to the Western Front.

After the Second World War, the battalion converted to become the 636th Light Anti-Aircraft Regiment, Royal Artillery (Royal Welch) and then amalgamated with the 635th (Royal Welch) Light Anti-Aircraft Regiment Royal Artillery to form the 446th (Royal Welch) Airborne Light Anti-Aircraft Regiment Royal Artillery at Caernarfon Barracks in 1955. The Back Lane drill hall was then decommissioned and was subsequently used for local community events including amateur dramatics.
