= Heinz Neuhaus =

German boxer

Personal information
- Nationality: German
- Born: 14 April 1926 Iserlohn, Germany
- Died: 6 April 1998 (aged 71)
- Height: 1.88 m (6 ft 2 in)
- Weight: Heavyweight

Boxing career
- Stance: Orthodox

Boxing record
- Total fights: 58
- Wins: 42
- Win by KO: 15
- Losses: 9
- Draws: 7

Heinz Neuhaus (14 April 1926 – 6 April 1998) was a German boxer who was heavyweight champion of Germany and Europe in the 1950s.

== Career ==
Born in Iserlohn, Neuhaus made his professional debut on 29 May 1949 with a points win over Herbert Thiele. He remained unbeaten in his first 18 fights and in October 1950 challenged Hein ten Hoff for the German (BDB) heavyweight title, the fight ending in a draw.

=== European Title ===
A further seven fights without a loss, including a draw with Johnny Williams, led to a challenge for the EBU European heavyweight title held by Karel Sys in March 1952. Neuhaus won the fight to become European champion. Neuhaus and Sys met again two months later, without the title at stake, this time Sys inflicting the first defeat of Neuhaus's career.

In July 1952, Neuhaus defended his European title against ten Hoff with the latter's German title also at stake; Neuhaus won by first-round knockout. He successfully defended both titles in November against Wilson Kohlbrecher. In March 1953, Neuhaus was rated by American magazine The Ring as 6th best heavyweight in the world, rising to fourth in November 1954. He made a further defence of the European title against Sys in August 1953, but lost for the second time in his career in November that year when he was knocked out in the fourth round by Niño Valdés.

He returned in January 1954 with a fourth-round knockout of Belgian champion Piet Wilde. He made a fourth successful defence of the European title in October 1954, knocking out Kurt Schiegl in the third round. In April 1955, Neuhaus was convicted of reckless driving while drunk and inflicting bodily injury, fined 1,500 Marks, banned from driving for six months, and sentenced to four weeks in prison. He lost the European title in his fifth defence, beaten on points by Franco Cavicchi in June 1955 in front of 60,000 spectators at the Palazzetto dello Sport, Bologna. He faced Cavicchi again three months later, winning via disqualification, but the title was not at stake.

=== Fading Away ===
In November 1955 Neuhaus lost his German title when he was beaten on points by Gerhard Hecht. He unsuccessfully challenged Cavicchi for the European title in July 1956, but regained his German title from Hecht in November. In February 1957 he outpointed Brian London, and two months later successfully defended his German title against Hans Friedrich. He lost the title in September when he was stopped in the eighth round by Hans Kalbfell.

In 1958 he fought a draw with Henry Cooper, beat Joey Maxim, and lost to Ingemar Johansson, before attempting to regain the German title in September. Defending champion Albert Westphal stopped him in the sixth round, and Neuhaus retired after the fight. He ended his career with a record of 42 wins from 58 fights.
