= Des Jones =

Wales international rugby union player

- Full name: William Desmond Jones
- Born: 25 October 1925 Tumble, Wales
- Died: 15 August 1987 (aged 61) Pontarddulais, Wales

Rugby union career
- Position: Lock
International career
Years	Team	Apps	(Points)
1948	Wales	1	(0)

William Desmond Jones (25 October 1925 — 15 August 1987) was a Welsh international rugby union player.

Born in Tumble, Jones attended Gwendraeth Grammar School and was a police officer by profession.

Jones gained his solitary Wales cap playing in the second-row against England for a 1948 Five Nations match at Twickenham which finished in a 3–3 draw. He was picked for Wales from Llanelly, a club he captained. In 1951, Jones was in the Llanelly side that faced the touring Springboks and scored a try.

== See also ==
- List of Wales national rugby union players
