= Tommy Farr =

Welsh boxer (1913–1986)

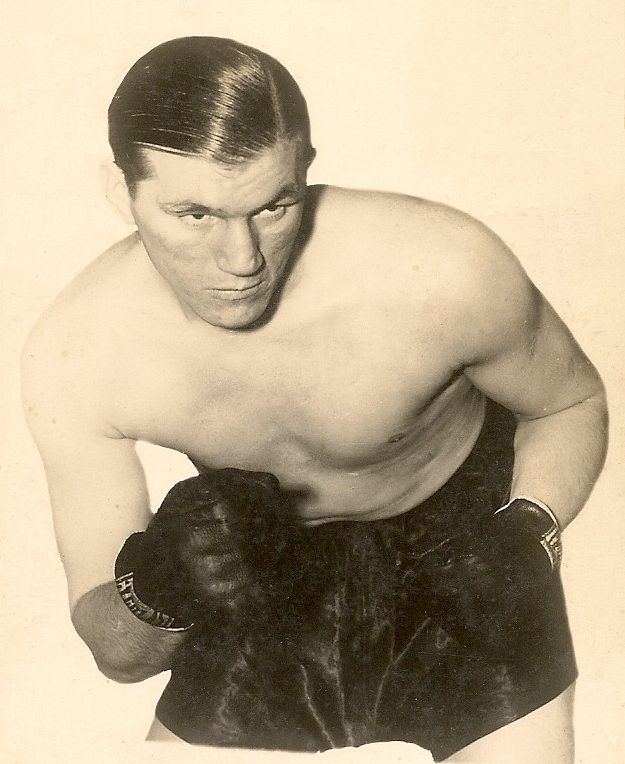

Personal information
- Nationality: British (Welsh)
- Born: Thomas George Farr; 12 March 1913 Clydach Vale, Rhondda, Wales
- Died: 1 March 1986 (aged 72)
- Weight: Heavyweight

Boxing career
- Stance: Orthodox

Boxing record
- Total fights: 137
- Wins: 84
- Win by KO: 24
- Losses: 34
- Draws: 17
- No contests: 2

Thomas George Farr (12 March 1913 – 1 March 1986) was a Welsh boxer from Clydach Vale, Rhondda, nicknamed "The Tonypandy Terror". Prior to 1936, Farr boxed in the light heavyweight division, in which he was the Welsh champion. He became British and Empire heavyweight champion on 15 March 1937. Farr is considered to be one of the greatest British heavyweight fighters ever, and was inducted into the Welsh Sports Hall of Fame in 1997.

In the United States, Farr is remembered for his 1937 world title challenge against Joe Louis. Considered one of Louis' toughest ever fights, the bout lasted the full 15 rounds and the large crowd saw Farr hurt Louis on numerous occasions. However the final result was controversial, being a wide unanimous decision in favour of Louis, with the referee awarding him the fight thirteen rounds to one, while the judges scored the fight eight to five and nine to six, both in Louis's favour. The announcement of the decision was roundly booed by the spectators. The bout was named The Ring magazine Fight of the Year for 1937.

== Boxing career ==
=== Early career ===
In his early career he didn't have much success. He garnered some wins but losses specked his record every two or three wins. Most of his losses were against unknowns. He soon started improving, with a win over top contender Tommy Loughran in 1936. In 1937 he bested ex-champion Max Baer and earned a title shot against Joe Louis.

=== World title fight vs Joe Louis ===
On 30 August 1937, Farr fought world heavyweight champion Joe Louis at the height of his career at Yankee Stadium, New York City. He earned respect despite losing a controversial points decision after 15 rounds. Louis had knocked out eight of his previous nine opponents and proceeded to knock out his next seven, but was attacked and hurt by Farr. The 50,000 crowd booed when Louis won. Referee Arthur Donovan, Sr. had seemingly raised Farr's glove in victory, causing controversy. Seven years later, in his published account of the fight, Donovan apologised for the 'mistake', claiming he had meant to shake Farr's hand to congratulate him for what he saw as an impressive fight. "Mistakes" hardly ended there, however: Donovan's own scorecard, had 13 rounds going to Louis.

Though mixed accounts say Louis deserved the nod, 13 rounds out of 15 prompted these words from a British sportswriter: "The verdict is that of a man either blindly partisan or afflicted with astigmatism. It is a verdict that justifies the beliefs that nothing short of the annihilation of Louis would have given Farr victory. That Louis won may not be disputed, but as I read the fight, there was only a fractional difference in his favour at the finish." However, In Donovan's account, he stands by his scoring of the fight, claiming that while Farr's punches may have appeared to have done more damage than Louis's from the crowd's point of view, from his perspective and that of the ringside judges the opposite was true.

Contrary views of the fight's result continued for many years. In The Encyclopedia of Boxing, as compiled by Gilbert Odd in the 1980s, Tommy's listing concludes its thumbnail on the championship bout with "...Louis came back strongly and clinched a narrow points verdict." The actual ferocity of the battle and its level of competition, seldom contested, may be summed up by Tommy Farr, later on in life: "When I talk about that fight, my nose still bleeds."

=== Later career ===
After the Louis fight, Farr was unsuccessful in several contests at Madison Square Garden, New York. These included a ten-round fight on 21 January 1938, against former heavyweight champion James J. Braddock, "the Cinderella Man". He also lost to Max Baer the same year, even though he had defeated him before. Farr returned to the UK early in 1939, enjoying a run of victories that year. He retired in 1940, but personal tragedies saw him lose his fortune. He ended up bankrupt, having to return to the ring at the age of 36 to make a living, during this time, he was taken under the wing of businessman Lesie T.Salts, the owner of Gwrych Castle. Farr later ran a pub in Brighton, Sussex, in final retirement, and died on Saint David's Day, 1986, aged 72. He is buried at Trealaw Cemetery.

== In popular culture ==
In 2007, Contender, a musical based on Farr's career, was composed by Mal Pope and premiered at the United Nations building in New York, followed by a season at Swansea's Grand Theatre. A theme of the musical is that Farr's lack of success in the US resulted wholly from his refusal to co-operate with fight-fixing mobsters and bookmakers.

== Notable bouts ==
Result	Opponent	Type	Rd., Time	Date	Location	Notes
Loss	(United Kingdom) Don Cockell	TKO	7 (12)	1953-03-09	(United Kingdom) Ice Rink, Nottingham, Nottinghamshire	
Loss	(United States) Lloyd Marshall	PTS	10	1950-12-04	(United Kingdom) Market Hall, Carmarthen	
Win	(Canada) Larry Gains	TKO	6 (10)	1939-05-17	(United Kingdom) Ninian Park, Cardiff	
Win	(United States) Red Burman	PTS	10	1939-04-13	(United Kingdom) Harringay Arena, Harringay, London	
Loss	(United States) Red Burman	PTS	10	1939-01-13	(United States) Madison Square Garden, New York, New York	
Loss	(United States) Lou Nova	PTS	15	1938-12-16	(United States) Madison Square Garden, New York, New York	
Loss	(United States) Max Baer	UD	15	1938-03-11	(United States) Madison Square Garden, New York, New York	
Loss	(United States) James J. Braddock	SD	10	1938-01-21	(United States) Madison Square Garden, New York, New York	
Loss	(United States) Joe Louis	UD	15	1937-08-30	(United States) Yankee Stadium, Bronx, New York	For NBA, NYSAC, and The Ring Magazine Heavyweight Titles. 1937 Fight of the Year by The Ring Magazine.
Win	(Nazi Germany) Walter Neusel	KO	3 (12)	1937-06-15	(United Kingdom) Harringay Arena, Harringay, London	
Win	(United States) Max Baer	PTS	12	1937-04-15	(United Kingdom) Harringay Arena, Harringay, London	
Win	(South Africa) Ben Foord	PTS	15	1937-03-15	(United Kingdom) Harringay Arena, Harringay, London	Won British and Commonwealth Heavyweight Titles.
Win	(United States) Bob Olin	PTS	10	1936-04-02	(United Kingdom) Royal Albert Hall, Kensington, London	
Win	(United States) Tommy Loughran	PTS	10	1936-01-15	(United Kingdom) Royal Albert Hall, Kensington, London	
Win	(United Kingdom) Frank Moody	KO	4 (12)	1935-12-21	(United Kingdom) Greyfriars Hall, Cardiff	
Draw	(United Kingdom) Frank Moody	PTS	15	1935-08-14	(United Kingdom) White City, Cardiff	
Win	(Canada) Del Fontaine	PTS	12	1934-09-03	(United Kingdom) Mannesmann Hall, Swansea	

== Bibliography ==
- Lonkhurst, Bob Man of Courage: The Life and Career of Tommy Farr Book Guild 1997, ISBN 1-85776-167-7. 250 pp.
- Myler P Ring of Hate: Joe Louis vs. Max Schmeling: The Fight of the Century Arcade Publishing (2005) This source contains a detailed report of Louis's fight with Tommy Farr, at page 113.
