= Hein ten Hoff =

German boxer (1919–2003)

Personal information
- Nickname: Gentleman of the Ring
- Nationality: German
- Born: Hein ten Hoff; November 19, 1919 Süddorf, Edewecht, Germany
- Died: June 13, 2003 (aged 83) Hamburg, Germany
- Height: 1.91 m (6 ft 3 in)
- Weight: Heavyweight

Boxing career
- Reach: 213 cm (84 in)

Boxing record
- Total fights: 43
- Wins: 32
- Win by KO: 28
- Losses: 7
- Draws: 4
Medal record
Men's Boxing
Representing Germany
European Amateur Championships
Gold medal – first place	1942 Breslau	Heavyweight

Hein ten Hoff (19 November 1919 – 13 June 2003) was a German boxer and Präsident des Bundes Deutscher Berufsboxer (BDB). He was the son of a Dutch peasant, who left The Netherlands for Germany (Oldenburg Land) in the end of the 1930s, and became a German citizen.

== Amateur career ==
As an amateur boxer, Hein ten Hoff had 185 wins, 78 by KO, for a total of 194 fights. He was thrice a German champion in the Heavyweight class (1940, 1941 and 1944 – he beat Herbert Runge), and won the gold medal at the 1942 European Amateur Boxing Championships in Breslau.

== Professional career ==
After World War II, he was a professional boxer, from September 1945 until August 1955 (won 32 (KO 28), lost 7 (KO 3), drawn 4, for a total of 43 fights). The international boxing world referred to him as the "Gentleman of the Ring", "Künstler" ('Artist'), or "Ästhet im Ring" ('Aesthete in the Ring'). He won the German BDB heavyweight title in 1946, then lost a ten-round decision to Jersey Joe Walcott, the upcoming World champion, at Mannheim 1950, and finally won the EBU (European) heavyweight title, defeating Jack Gardner at West Berlin 1951. He retired from professional boxing in 1955 after he was knocked out by Ingemar Johansson, the upcoming World champion, in Gothenburg.

== Notable bouts ==
Result	Opponent	Type	Rd., Time	Date	Location	Notes
Loss	(Sweden) Ingemar Johansson	KO	1 (8)	1955-08-28	(Sweden) Ullevi Gothenburg	
Loss	(West Germany) Heinz Neuhaus	PTS	10	1955-03-27	(West Germany) Westfalenhalle, Dortmund, Nordrhein-Westfalen	
Loss	(West Germany) Heinz Neuhaus	KO	1 (15)	1952-07-20	(West Germany) Stadion Rote Erde, Dortmund, Nordrhein-Westfalen	For EBU Heavyweight Title; Lost German BDB Heavyweight Title
Loss	(Belgium) Karel Sys	PTS	15	1952-01-12	(Belgium) Palais des Sports, Brussels	Lost EBU Heavyweight Title
Win	(United Kingdom) Jack Gardner	UD	15	1951-09-23	(West Germany) Waldbuehne, Westend, West Berlin	Won EBU Heavyweight Title
Draw	(West Germany) Heinz Neuhaus	PTS	12	1950-10-15	(West Germany) Rote Erde Stadion, Dortmund, Nordrhein-Westfalen	Retained German BDB Heavyweight Title
Loss	(United States) Jersey Joe Walcott	UD	10	1950-05-28	(West Germany) VFR Stadion, Mannheim, Baden-Württemberg	
Draw	(West Germany) Walter Neusel	PTS	12	1949-09-18	(West Germany) Reiterstadion, Düsseldorf, Nordrhein-Westfalen	Retained German BDB Heavyweight Title
Win	(West Germany) Herbert Runge	KO	7 (12)	1949-06-03	(West Germany) Prinzregentstadion, Munich, Bayern	Retained German BDB Heavyweight Title
Win	(Allied-occupied Germany) Arno Kölblin	KO	5 (12)	1948-05-16	(Allied-occupied Germany) Olympiastadion, Westend Berlin	Retained German BDB Heavyweight Title
Win	(Allied-occupied Germany) Herbert Runge	KO	5 (10)	1948-03-28	(Allied-occupied Germany) Messehalle, Leipzig, Sachsen	
Win	(Allied-occupied Germany) Walter Neusel	KO	7 (12)	1947-10-15	(Allied-occupied Germany) HSV Platz, Hamburg	Retained German BDB Heavyweight Title
Win	(Allied-occupied Germany) Walter Neusel	PTS	12	1946-08-03	(Allied-occupied Germany) HSV Sportplatz Rothenbaum, Hamburg	Won German BDB Heavyweight Title

Awards and achievements
Preceded by Walter Neusel	German BDB Heavyweight Champion; August 3, 1946 – July 20, 1952	Succeeded by Heinz Neuhaus
Preceded by Jack Gardner	EBU (European) Heavyweight Champion; September 23, 1951 – January 12, 1952	Succeeded by Karel Sys
