= Granby Halls =

Sports arena in Leicester, England

Coordinates: 52°37′30.31″N 1°7′58.24″W

Granby Halls was a popular live music, exhibition and sports arena in Leicester, England, also notable as the long-serving home of the professional basketball team, the Leicester Riders, from 1980 until 1999.

== History ==
Granby Halls was located in a triangle of prime land in central Leicester between the Welford Road Stadium (Leicester Tigers' home stadium), Leicester Royal Infirmary and Nelson Mandela Park and consisted of two halls, the main arena and a skating rink. The site was used for various functions since its initial opening in 1915, when it was built as the training halls for Leicester's Army recruits during World War I.

Ike & Tina Turner performed at Granby Halls with Edwin Starr, Alvin Robinson, and the Family on 21 October 1966.

The Rolling Stones played two nights there 14/15 May 1976, The Police one night in 1979, and Oasis played one night 17 November 1995.

The building was finally demolished in 2001 after standing dormant for 3 years. The site was used as a carpark while the council were still deciding what to do with the land, which was on the market for £1.3 million. As of 2024 a VoCo hotel is now situated on the site as part of the Leicester Tigers redevelopment scheme which started in 2022.
