= Harringay Arena =

Indoor sporting arena in London, United Kingdom

- The arena in its local context; sketched in 1954
- Interactive map of Harringay Arena
- Location: Green Lanes, Harringay, North London, England
- Coordinates: 51.576257°N 0.097697°W
- Owner: Greyhound Racing Association Trust Ltd
- Operator: Harringay Arena Limited
- Capacity: 10,000 (ice hockey)
- Surface: Versatile

Construction
- Built: February – October 1936
- Opened: 10 October 1936
- Closed: 28 October 1958
- Architect: Dr. Oscar Faber
- Main contractors: Dorman Long & Co. Ltd.

Tenants
- Harringay Racers; Harringay Greyhounds

Harringay Arena was a sporting and events venue on Green Lanes in Harringay, North London, England. Built in 1936, it lasted as a venue until 1958.

== Construction ==
Harringay Arena was built and owned by Brigadier-General Alfred Critchley under the auspices of his private company, the Greyhound Racing Association Trust Ltd (GRA). A new company, Harringay Arena Limited, whose directors were also directors of the GRA, was incorporated in 1936 to build and manage the venue. The company raised funds for the venture via a stock and share issue in January 1936.

Designed by Dr Oscar Faber, the arena was a stark modernist octagonal-shaped building which borrowed heavily from Maple Leaf Gardens in Toronto. It was erected adjacent to the Harringay Stadium in just eight months between February and October 1936. Its vast steel roof was constructed by Dorman Long & Co, who had recently been responsible for the Sydney Harbour Bridge and completed the new Wembley Stadium in 2007.

It had a seating capacity of almost 10,000 for ice hockey and slightly more for boxing. The actual arena was 198 feet (60 m) long by 88 feet (27 m) wide. A removable maple floor could be laid over the ice for non-sporting events. This arrangement clearly proved troublesome. At an event shortly after its opening the Daily Herald reported that "claims that Harringay had solved its cold-feet problem were not quite substantiated. Cold air from the ice below the boards filtered through".

== Sports venue ==
Specifically designed as an ice hockey venue, it quickly became famous as a venue for both ice hockey and boxing.

Up to the Second World War, ice hockey enjoyed its most popular era in the UK until a revival in the 1990s. Two local teams were formed for the Arena's opening, Harringay Racers and Harringay Greyhounds. On 26 October 1938, the first ice hockey game to be televised anywhere in the world was played at Harringay between the Racers and Streatham. A year later, WWII started and ice hockey matches were suspended. This interruption proved very damaging to the sport's popularity and post-war audiences remained thin for the remainder of the Arena's life.

Boxing became firmly established at the Arena prior to the war. On 7 April 1938 Harringay was the venue for the first boxing match to be televised live when the full 15 rounds between Len Harvey v Jock McAvoy were broadcast. Following the war Harringay was a very successful boxing venue. During its 22-year life, it was home to five world title fights, a record for any British venue by the time the Arena ceased operating as a venue in 1958.

However famous the Arena became for boxing, commercial necessity led to a diversification into a wider range of events including:

- The basketball and wrestling events for the 1948 Summer Olympics.
- All England Open Badminton Championships from 1947 to 1949.
- Home of the Horse of the Year Show for its first ten years, from 1949 to 1958. In its final year at Harringay, the show featured in the first broadcast of the BBC's new Saturday afternoon sports programme Grandstand.
- Roller Speedway from 1939 until 1952, with a break during the War. In 1953, with the demise of roller speedway, the Arena hosted a Roller Derby match.
- Wrestling.
- Five-a-side football.
- Basketball.
- European Netball Championships from 1955.

== Entertainment venue ==
The Arena's diversification went beyond sports and included a variety of entertainment events including:

=== Classical music and ballet ===
In the 1940s the arena hosted ground breaking classical music events popularising classical music for the first time including the London Music Festival in 1947 and 1948. The '48 festival included the hugely popular London debut of Pierino Gamba. 10,000 people watched this ten-year-old boy conduct the Liverpool Philharmonic Orchestra playing Beethoven and Dvořák. The festival also featured the world-famous Manuel Rosenthal, who brought his Orchestre National de France to join Sir Thomas Beecham and the Royal Philharmonic in a concert that filled the Harringay Arena with 13,500 listeners

A report in The Guardian on a classical music event in June of the following year said:

Harringay Arena as a concert Hall is staggering. The finicky hate it. That is an initial point in its favour. For those whose hearts are liberal and Whitmanesque, the current London Music Festival is moving as well as mammoth. Never before have I seen a multitude lie so quiescently in the hollow of a composer's hand. The Albert Hall is a restless and limited thing by comparison.

I passed turnstiles, barking stewards, ice-cream hawkers and bars stacked with sixpenny slices of pie. These are the things which make the finicky rear and paw ... At the end of the first movement 9,000 pairs of hands clapped uncontrollably. This was the only indiscretion of an intent and almost coughless evening.

Occasionally a locomotive on the nearby line to Southend hissed uncritically or improved the orchestration with a hoot.

Where did the thousands come from? I have never seen their like in any concert hall before. There was so little dimness among the elderly. There were so few corduroys, beards and bandanna headsquares among the young. These Harringaieties are, take them all in all, quite a phenomenon. Some sociologist should put them under his spy-glass.

Classical music events also figured large in the 1949 calendar.

In April, Paul Robeson appeared at Harringay as part of his European concert tour. Sell-out audiences, including one of 10,000 at the arena, led him to describe the tour as "the most successful concert tour of my career"

In June, there was a short season of classical music events including a two-week stay by the Philadelphia Orchestra. The event was part of their hyped European tour. They were the first American orchestra to visit the UK since 1929. Financed by British theatrical impresario Harold Fielding, the tour was a critical success, but high ticket prices kept the post-war audiences away.

From 27 August to 1 September, along with Empress Hall, Earl's Court, Harringay Arena was the venue for a series of five gala performances by Alicia Markova, Anton Dolin and the Ballet Rambert. The success of these performances led to the formation of the English National Ballet.

=== Circuses ===
The arena was well known as a venue for circuses. It was home to Tom Arnold's annual Harringay Circus for eleven seasons from Christmas 1947 to Christmas 1957. For the first circus show in 1947 Arnold hired twenty baby elephants specially imported from Ceylon by the Chipperfield family. They arrived at the George V Dock in London's Docklands in October 1947 on SS Arbratus.

Billy Smart Jr. occasionally appeared in these shows. At one of the Mammoth Christmas Circuses, he spray-painted five of his elephants white, yellow, blue, cream and pink.

The 1952 circus included an elephant act with Sabu, the young Indian actor made famous by his appearance in films such as The Thief of Baghdad.

The resident band for the circuses was led by Charles Shadwell; the signature tune "Down with the Curtain" always introduced the proceedings.

The arena also hosted a number of other circus shows. In 1956 the Moscow State Circus came to Harringay, the first occasion on which a state circus from the Soviet Union had visited Western Europe. Other events included a handful of western cowboy shows in the 1950s, including the 1952 Texas Western Spectacle, starring the famous cowboy singer/actor Tex Ritter.

=== Other events ===
- There were ice skating shows including the huge production of Rose Marie on Ice in July 1950 starring the 1948 Olympic Champion Barbara Ann Scott. The Arena was also open as an ice skating venue for the public.
- Harringay was the venue for the first National Colliery Music Festival in 1948. The festival included eight brass bands, three pipe bands and nine male voice choirs, all from collieries around the UK. There were also displays of clog dancing and sword dancing by colliery groups. The finale was a performance by a 700-strong choir accompanied by a massed brass band and conducted by Sir Adrian Boult.
- American evangelist Billy Graham held his first 'Crusade' in the UK at the Arena from 1 March – 12 May 1954. Audiences could hear Graham event Sunday during the three-month crusade. It was the first of 23 'crusades' and 'missions' that he held in the UK between 1954 and 1991. His visit was started off with a gala event at the stadium which included a visit by Roy Rogers and his famous horse Trigger.
- The Daily Worker used Harringay as a venue for its rallies in 1954 and 1950.
- The Ford Motor Company used the venue to launch the 1957 range of Ford cars namely the Consul, Zephyr and Zodiac.
- In the early summer of 1958, a music event was held at the Arena when people flocked to see the top artists of the day including Vera Lynn, James Kenny, Matt Monro, Petula Clark, Dennis Lotis, Marion Ryan and Laurie London. The concert was called the Starlight Dance and it has been referred to as the start of what is thought of today as the full-scale arena concert.
- In April 1949, Paul Robeson gave a short series of concerts at the Arena. He returned the following year to sing at the 20th Daily Worker rally.

== Decline and fall ==
Despite running an impressive and broad ranging calendar of events from 1947 to 1958, the change in the fortunes of ice hockey in the UK and the straitened post-war circumstances meant limited commercial success for the Arena after the Second World War. The arena hosted its final event on Tuesday, 28 October 1958. It was a sentimental occasion and promoter Jack Solomons headlined with a world-class lightweight fight between Dave Charnley and Carlos Ortiz (who was to go on to become world champion). The Times quoted part of the speech at that event in its paper the following day:

After 22 years Harringay Arena is closing. This evening we shall hear this great hall echo to cheers and see cigarette smoke swirl around the ring for the last time. The most important chapter in the history of British professional boxing is over.

Behind the scenes moves for the Arena's disposal had been going on for some time. International food retailer and manufacturer, Home & Colonial Stores Ltd were offered the site in 1957. They took possession of the building and the adjacent market hall in 1958. Works to convert the Arena to its new use were complete by February 1960. It was henceforth put to use as a food storage facility for the next 20 years until its demolition in 1978.

Through the early 1980s an open air Sunday market was held on the site up until the site was developed for shopping. The initial development included principally warehouse style shopping including DIY, bathroom and food wholesale outlets. A Royal Mail sorting facility was also built which survived the later redevelopment.

Early in the 21st century the whole site was redeveloped for retail shopping as the Arena Shopping Park, hosting mid-market brands such as Next, Carphone Warehouse, Homebase and a Fitness First gym.
