= Dick Turpin (boxer) =

English boxer (1920–1990)

Personal information
- Born: Lionel Turpin; 26 November 1920 Leamington Spa, England
- Died: 7 July 1990 (aged 69) Leamington Spa, England
- Weight: Middleweight

Boxing career
- Stance: Orthodox

Boxing record
- Total fights: 104
- Wins: 77
- Win by KO: 33
- Losses: 20
- Draws: 6
- No contests: 1

Lionel "Dick" Turpin (26 November 1920 – 7 July 1990) was an English middleweight boxer. He was British and Commonwealth middleweight champion, reputedly being the first black fighter to win a British boxing title. He was elder brother and trainer of the more famous Randolph Turpin, who became world middleweight champion after beating Sugar Ray Robinson in 1951.. Dick Turpin's father, Lionel Turpin Senior, had emigrated from British Guiana and settled in Leamington Spa, where he worked in a foundry. He died young from injuries sustained during the First World War, leaving his wife Beatrice to raise five children. The family's boxing tradition extended across three brothers: Jack competed as a featherweight, Dick as a middleweight, and Randolph went on to become world champion. Dick's historic victory over Vince Hawkins on 28 June 1948 was notable not only for the title it secured but for the barriers it broke: he became the first black fighter to win a British boxing title in the modern era, in a period when racial discrimination remained widespread in British sport and society. Despite his own championship credentials, Dick devoted much of his later boxing life to training and managing Randolph, accompanying him to New York for the Sugar Ray Robinson fight in 1951.

Dick was the son of Lionel Turpin who had been born in British Guyana and his wife, Beatrice Elizabeth Whitehouse. He had two brothers Jack, who was a featherweight and Randolph, a middleweight.

== Professional career ==
Turpin fought his first professional bout in March 1939 against Jimmy Griffiths, in Coventry. He lost on points over ten rounds.

He went on to build up a domestic record of 86 fights with 68 wins, 12 losses, 5 draws and one no-contest, before his first title fight. This was for the Commonwealth middleweight title, in May 1948, and was against Richard Bos Murphy of New Zealand. Turpin won the fight, at Coventry, by a knockout in the first round to become Commonwealth champion.

In his next bout, on 28 June 1948, Turpin fought Vince Hawkins for his British middleweight title. The fight was held at Villa Park, Birmingham and Turpin won on points over fifteen rounds. He now held both the British and Commonwealth middleweight titles.

During late 1948 and early 1949, Turpin fought European boxers, drawing and then losing on points against Tiberio Mitri, of Italy, then being knocked out in seven rounds in a non-title fight against the then world middleweight champion, Marcel Cerdan, of France. He then won by a disqualification against another Frenchman, Robert Charron.

In June 1949, he defended his British and Commonwealth titles against Albert Finch, winning on points after fifteen rounds.

In September 1949, he defended his Commonwealth title against Australian, Dave Sands. The fight was at Harringay Arena, and Turpin was knocked out in the first round, and so only retained his British title.

Turpin then won his next four fights, losing the fifth, on points to the American, Baby Day, before defending his British title against Albert Finch, whom he had beaten in his previous defence. The fight was held in April 1950, in Nottingham and Finch won on points after fifteen rounds.

Having lost both his titles, Turpin had only two more fights, against the Belgian, Cyrille Delannoit, in Brussels, losing on a technical knockout in the sixth, and finally against his old rival Albert Finch, losing on a technical knockout in the eighth. This last fight was in July 1950.

== Trainer ==
Turpin was the trainer of his more successful and famous brother Randolph, who beat Sugar Ray Robinson to take the world middleweight title in 1951.

== Professional boxing record ==
108 fights	81 wins	21 losses
By knockout	35	8
By decision	45	13
By disqualification	1	0
Draws	5	
No contests	1	

No.	Result	Record	Opponent	Type	Round	Date	Location	Notes
108	Loss	81–21–5 (1)	Albert Finch	RTD	8 (10)	Jul 3, 1950	Ice Rink, Nottingham, Nottinghamshire, England	
107	Loss	81–20–5 (1)	Cyrille Delannoit	RTD	7 (10)	May 13, 1950	Palais des Sports, Schaerbeek, Bruxelles-Capitale, Belgium	
106	Loss	81–19–5 (1)	Albert Finch	PTS	15	Apr 24, 1950	Ice Rink, Nottingham, Nottinghamshire, England	For BBBofC British middleweight title
105	Loss	81–18–5 (1)	Baby Day	PTS	10	Mar 14, 1950	Royal Albert Hall, Kensington, London, England	
104	Win	81–17–5 (1)	Ron Pudney	PTS	8	Mar 6, 1950	Davis Theatre, Croydon, London, England	
103	Win	80–17–5 (1)	Vince Hawkins	PTS	8	Jan 16, 1950	Drill Hall, Coventry, West Midlands, England	
102	Win	79–17–5 (1)	Ron Cooper	PTS	8	Dec 12, 1949	Ice Rink, Nottingham, Nottinghamshire, England	
101	Win	78–17–5 (1)	George Ross	TKO	7 (10)	Nov 1, 1949	Bingley Hall, Birmingham, West Midlands, England	
100	Loss	77–17–5 (1)	Dave Sands	KO	1 (15)	Sep 6, 1949	Harringay Arena, Harringay, London, England	Lost vacant BBBofC British and Commonwealth British middleweight title
99	Win	77–16–5 (1)	Albert Finch	PTS	15	Jun 20, 1949	St Andrews (Birmingham City FC), Birmingham, West Midlands, England	Won vacant BBBofC British and Commonwealth British middleweight title
98	Win	76–16–5 (1)	Robert Charron	DQ	5 (10)	May 30, 1949	Earls Court Empress Hall, Kensington, London, England	
97	Loss	75–16–5 (1)	Marcel Cerdan	KO	7 (10)	Mar 29, 1949	Earls Court Empress Hall, Kensington, London, England	
96	Loss	75–15–5 (1)	Tiberio Mitri	PTS	12	Mar 12, 1949	Idroscalo, Trieste, Friuli-Venezia Giulia, Italy	
95	Draw	75–14–5 (1)	Tiberio Mitri	PTS	12	Nov 29, 1948	Royal Albert Hall, Kensington, London, England	
94	Win	75–14–4 (1)	Doug Miller	RTD	7 (8)	Oct 18, 1948	Royal Albert Hall, Kensington, London, England	
93	Win	74–14–4 (1)	Bert Sanders	PTS	8	Sep 27, 1948	Embassy Rink, Birmingham, West Midlands, England	
92	Win	73–14–4 (1)	Vince Hawkins	PTS	15	Jun 28, 1948	Villa Park, Birmingham, West Midlands, England	Retained Commonwealth British Empire middleweight title Won BBBofC British middleweight title
91	Win	72–14–4 (1)	Bos Murphy	KO	1 (15)	May 18, 1948	Highfield Road (Coventry City FC), Coventry, West Midlands, England	Won Commonwealth British Empire middleweight title
90	Win	71–14–4 (1)	Mark Hart	PTS	12	Feb 2, 1948	Ice Rink, Nottingham, Nottinghamshire, England	
89	Win	70–14–4 (1)	Bert Sanders	PTS	8	Dec 1, 1947	Town Hall, Leeds, Yorkshire, England	
88	Win	69–14–4 (1)	Ron Cooper	PTS	8	Nov 20, 1947	Skating Rink, Smethwick, West Midlands, England	
87	Win	68–14–4 (1)	Freddie Price	PTS	10	Nov 7, 1947	King's Hall, Belle Vue, Manchester, Lancashire, England	
86	Win	67–14–4 (1)	Billy Stevens	PTS	10	Oct 23, 1947	New St James Hall, Newcastle, Tyne and Wear, England	
85	Win	66–14–4 (1)	Johnny Boyd	PTS	8	Sep 22, 1947	Drill Hall, Wolverhampton, West Midlands, England	
84	Win	65–14–4 (1)	Art Owen	RTD	2 (8)	Sep 18, 1947	Assembly Rooms, Tunbridge Wells, Kent, England	
83	Win	64–14–4 (1)	Vince Hawkins	TKO	6 (8)	Sep 9, 1947	Butts Stadium, Coventry, West Midlands, England	
82	Win	63–14–4 (1)	Tommy Davies	TKO	5 (10)	Jul 24, 1947	The Stadium, Liverpool, Merseyside, England	
81	Win	62–14–4 (1)	Bert Sanders	PTS	8	Jul 12, 1947	Picture House, Stratford-upon-Avon, Warwickshire, England	
80	Win	61–14–4 (1)	Des Jones	PTS	8	Jul 5, 1947	Skating Rink, Bedford, Bedfordshire, England	
79	Win	60–14–4 (1)	Jim Hockley	PTS	8	Jun 23, 1947	Drill Hall, Coventry, West Midlands, England	
78	Win	59–14–4 (1)	Billy Stevens	TKO	3 (10)	May 29, 1947	The Stadium, Liverpool, Merseyside, England	
77	Win	58–14–4 (1)	Norman Rees	RTD	2 (10)	May 23, 1947	Judge's Hall, Trealaw, Wales	
76	Win	57–14–4 (1)	Jim Wellard	PTS	8	May 6, 1947	Wembley Town Hall, Wembley, London, England	
75	Win	56–14–4 (1)	Gordon Griffiths	TKO	4 (8)	Apr 14, 1947	Town Hall, Oxford, Oxfordshire, England	
74	Win	55–14–4 (1)	Tommy Braddock	RTD	4 (8)	Apr 3, 1947	Leamington Spa, Warwickshire, England	
73	Win	54–14–4 (1)	Frank Hayes	KO	4 (8)	Mar 24, 1947	Birmingham, West Midlands, England	
72	Win	53–14–4 (1)	Ron Cooper	PTS	8	Mar 17, 1947	Winter Gardens, Malvern, Worcestershire, England	
71	Draw	52–14–4 (1)	Bert Sanders	PTS	8	Feb 10, 1947	Town Hall, Oxford, Oxfordshire, England	
70	Loss	52–14–3 (1)	George Howard	KO	7 (8)	Jan 14, 1947	Seymour Hall, Marylebone, London, England	
69	Win	52–13–3 (1)	Billy Mayne	TKO	7 (10)	Dec 16, 1946	Embassy Rink, Birmingham, West Midlands, England	
68	Win	51–13–3 (1)	Johnny Boyd	KO	4 (8)	Dec 9, 1946	Town Hall, Oxford, Oxfordshire, England	
67	Loss	50–13–3 (1)	Johnny Best	TKO	4 (10)	Nov 19, 1946	Seymour Hall Baths, Marylebone, London, England	
66	Win	50–12–3 (1)	Trevor Burt	KO	3 (10)	Nov 11, 1946	Winter Gardens, Malvern, Worcestershire, England	
65	Win	49–12–3 (1)	Art Owen	TKO	6 (10)	Oct 28, 1946	Granby Halls, Leicester, Leicestershire, England	
64	Win	48–12–3 (1)	Jack Lord	KO	3 (10)	Oct 16, 1946	Embassy Rink, Birmingham, West Midlands, England	
63	Win	47–12–3 (1)	Johnny Blake	TKO	4 (10)	Oct 14, 1946	Town Hall, Oxford, Oxfordshire, England	
62	Win	46–12–3 (1)	Paddy Roche	PTS	10	Sep 30, 1946	Corn Exchange, Stroud, Gloucestershire, England	
61	Loss	45–12–3 (1)	Johnny Boyd	PTS	8	Sep 24, 1946	Embassy Rink, Birmingham, West Midlands, England	
60	Win	45–11–3 (1)	Jack McKnight	KO	1 (10)	Feb 26, 1946	Co-op Hall, Rugby, Warwickshire, England	
59	Loss	44–11–3 (1)	Dave McCleave	PTS	8	Mar 18, 1944	Drill Hall, Coventry, West Midlands, England	
58	Loss	44–10–3 (1)	Arthur 'Ginger' Sadd	TKO	7 (10)	Dec 16, 1940	Ice Rink, Nottingham, Nottinghamshire, England	
57	Win	44–9–3 (1)	Pat O'Connor	PTS	10	Aug 24, 1940	Highfield Road (Coventry FC), Coventry, West Midlands, England	
56	Win	43–9–3 (1)	Albert O'Brien	KO	2 (10)	Jul 13, 1940	Rugby Football Ground, Northampton, Northamptonshire, England	
55	Win	42–9–3 (1)	Paddy Roche	PTS	10	Jun 10, 1940	Skating Rink, Nuneaton, Warwickshire, England	
54	Win	41–9–3 (1)	Tommy Davies	PTS	10	Jun 3, 1940	Plasmarl, Swansea, Wales	
53	Win	40–9–3 (1)	Jim Berry	PTS	10	May 27, 1940	King's Hall, Belle Vue, Manchester, Lancashire, England	
52	Loss	39–9–3 (1)	Eddie Maguire	PTS	10	May 20, 1940	Tower Ballroom, Edgbaston, Birmingham, West Midlands, England	
51	Win	39–8–3 (1)	Tommy Smith	TKO	10 (10)	Apr 14, 1940	Arena, Coventry, West Midlands, England	
50	Draw	38–8–3 (1)	Eddie Maguire	PTS	10	Apr 1, 1940	Tower Ballroom, Edgbaston, Birmingham, West Midlands, England	
49	Win	38–8–2 (1)	Sid Williams	PTS	10	Mar 15, 1940	Town Hall, Oxford, Oxfordshire, England	
48	Win	37–8–2 (1)	Dave McCleave	KO	5 (10)	Mar 4, 1940	Tower Ballroom, Edgbaston, Birmingham, West Midlands, England	
47	Win	36–8–2 (1)	Arthur 'Ginger' Sadd	PTS	10	Feb 25, 1940	Arena, Coventry, West Midlands, England	
46	Win	35–8–2 (1)	Maurice Dennis	TKO	7 (10)	Jan 24, 1940	Arena, Coventry, West Midlands, England	
45	Win	34–8–2 (1)	Ben Valentine	PTS	10	Dec 24, 1939	Arena, Coventry, West Midlands, England	
44	Win	33–8–2 (1)	Ben Valentine	PTS	10	Dec 10, 1939	Arena, Coventry, West Midlands, England	
43	Loss	32–8–2 (1)	George Howard	PTS	10	Nov 26, 1939	Arena, Coventry, West Midlands, England	
42	Win	32–7–2 (1)	Charlie Parkin	PTS	10	Oct 30, 1939	Skating Rink, Northampton, Northamptonshire, England	
41	Win	31–7–2 (1)	Harry Ainsworth	PTS	12	Aug 18, 1939	Arena, Coventry, West Midlands, England	
40	Win	30–7–2 (1)	George Robey	TKO	11 (12)	Aug 7, 1939	Shipston-on-Stour, Worcestershire, England	
39	Win	29–7–2 (1)	Nat Franks	PTS	10	Jun 4, 1939	The Arena, Mile End, London, England	
38	Win	28–7–2 (1)	Jack Milburn	PTS	15	May 22, 1939	Northampton County Ground, Northampton, Northamptonshire, England	Won vacant BBBofC Midlands Area middleweight title
37	Win	27–7–2 (1)	Wally Pack	PTS	8	May 7, 1939	Devonshire Club, Hackney, London, England	
36	Win	26–7–2 (1)	Alf Bishop	KO	?	Apr 29, 1939	Colston Hall, Bristol, Gloucestershire, England	
35	Loss	25–7–2 (1)	George Robey	PTS	10	Apr 21, 1939	Banbury, Oxfordshire, England	
34	Win	25–6–2 (1)	Jimmy Griffiths	PTS	10	Apr 17, 1939	Leamington Spa, Warwickshire, England	
33	Loss	24–6–2 (1)	Jimmy Griffiths	PTS	10	Mar 30, 1939	Drill Hall, Coventry, West Midlands, England	
32	Win	24–5–2 (1)	Ted Carroll	PTS	10	Mar 25, 1939	Evesham, Worcestershire, England	
31	Win	23–5–2 (1)	George Robey	PTS	10	Mar 17, 1939	Spencer Stadium, Banbury, Oxfordshire, England	
30	Win	22–5–2 (1)	Jack Hammer	PTS	12	Mar 13, 1939	Town Hall, Northampton, Northamptonshire, England	
29	Win	21–5–2 (1)	Johnny Thornton	TKO	5 (10)	Mar 6, 1939	Bingham Hall, Cirencester, Gloucestershire, England	
28	Win	20–5–2 (1)	Jack Beech	KO	2 (10)	Feb 27, 1939	Colonnade Skating Rink, Leamington Spa, Warwickshire, England	
27	Win	19–5–2 (1)	Mick Miller	PTS	10	Feb 24, 1939	Banbury, Oxfordshire, England	
26	Loss	18–5–2 (1)	Ernie Butcher Gascoigne	PTS	10	Jan 28, 1939	Public Hall, Evesham, Worcestershire, England	
25	Win	18–4–2 (1)	Walter Rankin	PTS	10	Jan 19, 1939	Town Hall, Kidderminster, Worcestershire, England	
24	Win	17–4–2 (1)	Alf Bishop	PTS	10	Dec 26, 1938	Colonnade Skating Rink, Leamington Spa, Warwickshire, England	
23	Loss	16–4–2 (1)	Charlie Parkin	PTS	10	Dec 10, 1938	Public Hall, Evesham, Worcestershire, England	
22	Win	16–3–2 (1)	Jack McKnight	PTS	10	Nov 21, 1938	Royal Spa Centre, Leamington Spa, Warwickshire, England	
21	Loss	15–3–2 (1)	Charlie Parkin	PTS	10	Nov 14, 1938	Arena, Coventry, West Midlands, England	
20	Win	15–2–2 (1)	Trevor Burt	KO	5 (10)	Nov 7, 1938	Colston Hall, Bristol, Avon, England	
19	Win	14–2–2 (1)	Mick Miller	KO	2 (10)	Oct 10, 1938	Leamington Spa, Warwickshire, England	
18	Draw	13–2–2 (1)	Alf Bishop	PTS	10	Oct 3, 1938	Kingsholm Rugby Ground, Gloucester, Gloucestershire, England	
17	Win	13–2–1 (1)	Johnny Clark	PTS	10	Aug 11, 1938	Kingsholm Rugby Ground, Gloucester, Gloucestershire, England	
16	Loss	12–2–1 (1)	Rex Whitney	PTS	10	Jun 11, 1938	Graziers Arms, West Haddon, Northamptonshire, England	
15	Win	12–1–1 (1)	Sid Fitzhugh	PTS	8	May 23, 1938	Semilong Working Men's Club, Northampton, Northamptonshire, England	
14	Win	11–1–1 (1)	Trevor Burt	PTS	8	Mar 28, 1938	Public Hall, Evesham, Worcestershire, England	
13	Win	10–1–1 (1)	Frankie Smith	TKO	4 (8)	Mar 19, 1938	Drill Hall, Coventry, West Midlands, England	
12	Draw	9–1–1 (1)	Bob Hartley	PTS	8	Mar 7, 1938	Co-op Hall, Rugby, Warwickshire, England	
11	Win	9–1 (1)	Walter Rankin	PTS	8	Feb 28, 1938	Skating Rink, Nuneaton, Warwickshire, England	
10	Win	8–1 (1)	Bill Blythling	TKO	4 (8)	Feb 19, 1938	Evesham, Worcestershire, England	
9	Win	7–1 (1)	Ray Chadwick	KO	4 (8)	Dec 18, 1937	Public Hall, Evesham, Worcestershire, England	
8	Win	6–1 (1)	Frank Guest	KO	6 (6)	Dec 13, 1937	Embassy Rink, Birmingham, West Midlands, England	
7	NC	5–1 (1)	Eddie Harris	ND	4 (6)	Nov 21, 1937	Public Hall, Evesham, Worcestershire, England	
6	Win	5–1	Phil Proctor	KO	2 (6)	Nov 20, 1937	Public Hall, Evesham, Worcestershire, England	
5	Win	4–1	Trevor Burt	PTS	4	Nov 15, 1937	Arena, Coventry, West Midlands, England	
4	Win	3–1	Frank Guest	PTS	4	Nov 1, 1937	Sparkbrook Stadium, Birmingham, West Midlands, England	
3	Win	2–1	Eddie Harris	TKO	6 (6)	Oct 16, 1937	Public Hall, Evesham, Worcestershire, England	
2	Loss	1–1	Trevor Burt	KO	3 (6)	Oct 4, 1937	Arena, Coventry, West Midlands, England	
1	Win	1–0	Eric Lloyd	TKO	6 (6)	Sep 27, 1937	Co-op Hall, Rugby, Warwickshire, England	

== See also ==
- List of British middleweight boxing champions

== Sources ==
- Boxing record for Dick Turpin from BoxRec (registration required)
