= Albert Finch =

English boxer

Personal information
- Nationality: British
- Born: Albert Finch; 16 May 1926 Croydon, England
- Died: 23 January 2003 (aged 76)
- Weight: Light Heavyweight

Boxing career

Boxing record
- Total fights: 103
- Wins: 72
- Win by KO: 21
- Losses: 21
- Draws: 9
- No contests: 1

Albert Finch (16 May 1926 – 23 January 2003) was a British boxer from Croydon in South London, who was active from 1945 to 1958. He fought as both a middleweight and light-heavyweight, becoming British middleweight champion in 1950.

He was one of seven children and learnt to box at the age of eight. He had a successful amateur career, winning 63 out of 68 contests.

== Professional career ==
He had his first professional fight on 14 August 1945 at the Queensbury Club, Soho, London. He fought a draw over six rounds against Eddie Starrs.

He continued to build up a successful domestic record with the odd defeat. In October 1948 he beat Mark Hart for the Southern Area middleweight title, winning on points over 12 rounds.

In April 1948, he fought the promising young middleweight, Randolph Turpin, at the Royal Albert Hall, and inflicted Turpin's first defeat, winning on points over eight rounds.

In June 1949, he challenged Dick Turpin, elder brother of Randolph, for his British and Commonwealth middleweight titles. The fight was held in Birmingham and Turpin won on points over fifteen rounds.

In April 1950, he had a re-match with Dick Turpin, who in the meantime had lost his Commonwealth title. The fight was held in Nottingham and Finch won on points over fifteen rounds after having been knocked down twice. He was now the British middleweight champion.

Finch held the British title for only six months before losing it to Dick Turpin's brother, Randolph in October 1950. They met at Harringay Arena, and Turpin, who had a powerful punch, knocked Finch out in the fifth round.

Finch began to find it difficult to make the middleweight weight limit and so moved up to fight as a light-heavyweight. Following the Turpin defeat, he had a run of seven straight victories against light-heavyweights before fighting Don Cockell for his British and European light-heavyweight titles. The fight was in October 1951, at the Harringay Arena, and Cockell won by a knockout in the seventh round.

He continued fighting as a light-heavyweight and in November 1954 he had another attempt at the British light-heavyweight title when he fought the holder, Alex Buxton, in Birmingham. Unfortunately, he suffered another knockout, this time in the eighth round. By fighting at the heavier weight he was meeting heavier punches and so suffered more knockouts than previously.

In March 1956, he had a third attempt at the British light-heavyweight title when he fought Ron Barton for the vacant title. The fight at Harringay Arena ended with Barton winning by a technical knockout in the eighth round. This was his last title fight.

He continued fighting, with mixed success. One notable victory was a win by disqualification against Jim Cooper, Henry Cooper's twin brother, in Stockholm. He had his last fight in March 1958, losing by a knockout in the third round against Noel Trigg.

== Retirement ==
After his retirement he worked at a meat market in Croydon and was active in assisting youthful boxers. He died in 2003 at the age of 76 years.

== Professional boxing record ==
72 Wins (21 knockouts, 50 decisions, 1 DQ), 21 Losses (9 knockouts, 11 decisions, 1 DQ), 9 Draws, 1 No Contest
Result	Record	Opponent	Type	Round	Date	Location	Notes
Loss	72–21-9 (1)	(Wales) Noel Trigg	KO	3	17 March 1958	(United Kingdom) Cheltenham Town Hall, Cheltenham, Gloucestershire	
Draw	72–20-9	(United Kingdom) Ron Redrup	PTS	8	3 February 1958	(United Kingdom) Leyton Baths, Leyton, England	
Draw	72–20–8 (1)	(United Kingdom) Jack Whittaker	PTS	8	13 January 1958	(United Kingdom) Cheltenham Town Hall, Cheltenham, Gloucestershire	
Win	72–20–7 (1)	(United Kingdom) Tony Dove	PTS	10	3 October 1957	(United Kingdom) Corn Hall, Norwich, Norfolk	
Loss	71–20–7 (1)	(Scotland) Willie Armstrong	PTS	8	21 August 1957	(Scotland) Ice Rink, Paisley	
Loss	71–19-7 (1)	(United Kingdom) Manuel Burgo	KO	2	29 July 1957	(United Kingdom) Engineer's Club, West Hartlepool, County Durham	
Win	71–18-7 (1)	(United Kingdom) Jim Cooper	DQ	7	19 May 1957	(Sweden) Johanneshovs Isstadion, Stockholm	
Win	70–18–7 (1)	(United Kingdom) Terrence Murphy	PTS	12	26 March 1957	(United Kingdom) Streatham Ice Arena, Streatham, England	BBBofC Southern Area Light Heavyweight Title.
Loss	69–18–7 (1)	(Germany) Erich Schoppner	PTS	8	3 February 1957	(Germany) Westfalenhallen, Dortmund, North Rhine-Westphalia	
Win	69–17–7 (1)	(France) Serge Leveque	PTS	8	28 December 1956	(Sweden) Masshallen, Gothenburg	
Win	68–17-7 (1)	(Belgium) Andre Cottyn	TKO	10	8 September 1956	(Belgium) Ostend, West Flanders	
Loss	67–17-7 (1)	(United Kingdom) Ron Barton	TKO	8	13 March 1956	(United Kingdom) Harringay Arena, Harringay, London	BBBofC Light Heavyweight Title.
Draw	67–16-7 (1)	(Germany) Uwe Janssen	PTS	8	22 January 1956	(Germany) Westfalenhallen, Dortmund, North Rhine-Westphalia	
Win	67–16–6 (1)	(France) Charles Colin	PTS	10	30 October 1955	(France) St. Nazaire Stadium, Saint-Nazaire, Loire-Atlantique	
Draw	66–16-6 (1)	(United Kingdom) Fred Powell	PTS	8	4 October 1955	(United Kingdom) Streatham Ice Arena, Streatham, England	
Loss	66–16–5 (1)	(United Kingdom) Alex Buxton	KO	8	9 November 1954	(United Kingdom) Embassy Sportsdrome, Birmingham, West Midlands	BBBofC Light Heavyweight Title.
Win	66–15–5 (1)	(Belgium) Marcel Limage	TKO	9	18 May 1954	(United Kingdom) Royal Albert Hall, Kensington, London	
Win	65–15–5 (1)	(United Kingdom) Arthur Howard	TKO	8	23 March 1954	(United Kingdom) Earls Court Arena, Kensington, London	BBBofC Light Heavyweight Title Eliminator.
Win	64–15-5 (1)	(Jamaica) Joe Bygraves	PTS	8	23 February 1954	(United Kingdom) Royal Albert Hall, Kensington, London	
Win	63–15-5 (1)	(United Kingdom) Billy Dean	TKO	5	3 November 1953	(United Kingdom) Harringay Arena, Harringay, London	
Win	62–15–5 (1)	(Wales) Dave Williams	TKO	7	20 October 1953	(United Kingdom) Streatham Ice Arena, Streatham, England	
Draw	61–15–5 (1)	(United Kingdom) Arthur Howard	PTS	8	13 October 1953	(United Kingdom) Earls Court Arena, Kensington, London	
Win	61–15–4 (1)	(United Kingdom) Jimmy Davis	PTS	8	6 October 1953	(United Kingdom) Royal Albert Hall, Kensington, London	
Loss	60–15–4 (1)	(Wales) Dennis Powell	PTS	10	8 September 1953	(United Kingdom) Park Hall, Oswestry, Shropshire	
Loss	60–14-4 (1)	(Netherlands) Wim Snoek	PTS	10	18 May 1953	(United Kingdom) Empress Hall, Earl's Court, Kensington, London	
Win	60-13–4 (1)	(France) Charles Colin	PTS	10	25 April 1953	(France) St. Nazaire Stadium, Saint-Nazaire, Loire-Atlantique	
Loss	59–13–4 (1)	(Germany) Gerhard Hecht	TKO	9	20 March 1953	(Germany) Funkturm Berlin, Westend, Berlin	
Win	59–12–4 (1)	(United Kingdom) Johnny Barton	PTS	8	16 February 1953	(United Kingdom) Leyton Baths, Leyton, England	
Loss	58–12-4 (1)	(United Kingdom) George Walker	DQ	5	2 December 1952	(United Kingdom) Empress Hall, Earl's Court, Kensington, London	BBBofC Southern Area Light Heavyweight Title.
Loss	58–11-4 (1)	(United Kingdom) George Walker	KO	6	28 October 1952	(United Kingdom) Empress Hall, Earl's Court, Kensington, London	
Win	58–10–4 (1)	(United Kingdom) Brian Anders	PTS	8	14 October 1952	(United Kingdom) Streatham Ice Arena, Streatham, England	
Win	57–10–4 (1)	(Northern Ireland) Garnett Denny	PTS	10	23 February 1952	(Northern Ireland) Ulster Hall, Belfast	
Win	56–10–4 (1)	(France) Michel Lapourielle	TKO	8	13 February 1952	(United Kingdom) Brighton Dome, Brighton, Sussex	
Win	55–10-4 (1)	(Canada) Gene "KO" Fowler	TKO	5	21 January 1952	(United Kingdom) Leyton Baths, Leyton, England	
Loss	54–10–4 (1)	(United Kingdom) Don Cockell	KO	7	16 October 1951	(United Kingdom) Harringay Arena, Harringay, London	BBBofC/EBU Light Heavyweight Titles.
Win	54–9–4 (1)	(South Africa) Billy Wood	TKO	5	29 May 1951	(United Kingdom) Selhurst Park, Crystal Palace, London	
Win	53–9-4 (1)	(Wales) Dave Williams	TKO	5	16 May 1951	(Wales) Maindy Stadium, Cardiff	
Win	52–9–4 (1)	(Northern Ireland) Paddy Slavin	PTS	10	30 April 1951	(United Kingdom) Empress Hall, Earl's Court, Kensington, London	
Win	51–9–4 (1)	(United Kingdom) Johnny McGowan	TKO	9	19 March 1951	(United Kingdom) Granby Halls, Leicester, Leicestershire	
Win	50–9–4 (1)	(Canada) Don Mogard	PTS	8	26 February 1951	(United Kingdom) Leyton Baths, Leyton, England	
Win	49–9–4 (1)	(United States) Jackie Harris	PTS	8	12 February 1951	(United Kingdom) Leyton Baths, Leyton, England	
Win	48–9–4 (1)	(United Kingdom) Reg Spring	PTS	8	22 January 1951	(United Kingdom) Leyton Baths, Leyton, England	
Loss	47–9–4 (1)	(United Kingdom) Randy Turpin	KO	5	17 October 1950	(United Kingdom) Harringay Arena, Harringay, London	BBBofC Middleweight Title. Finch knocked out at 1:02 of the fifth round.
Win	47–8-4 (1)	(Belgium) Albert Heyen	PTS	10	27 September 1950	(Wales) Ynysangharad Park, Pontypridd	
Draw	46–8–4 (1)	(Belgium) Cyrille Delannoit	PTS	10	21 July 1950	(Belgium) Ostend, West Flanders	
Win	46–8–3 (1)	(United Kingdom) Dick Turpin	TKO	8	3 July 1950	(United Kingdom) Nottingham Ice Stadium, Nottingham, Nottinghamshire	
Win	45–8–3 (1)	(Belgium) Eli Elandon	PTS	10	26 June 1950	(United Kingdom) Town Hall, Northampton, Northamptonshire	
Win	44-8-3 (1)	(Spain) Juan Torrecillas	TKO	3	12 June 1950	(United Kingdom) Selhurst Park, Crystal Palace, London	
Win	43–8–3 (1)	(United Kingdom) Dick Turpin	PTS	15	24 April 1950	(United Kingdom) Nottingham Ice Stadium, Nottingham, Nottinghamshire	BBBofC Middleweight Title.
Win	42–8–3 (1)	(United Kingdom) Joe Beckett	PTS	10	29 March 1950	(United Kingdom) Norwich, Norfolk	
Draw	41–8–3 (1)	(United States) Mel Brown	PTS	10	13 March 1950	(United Kingdom) Streatham Ice Arena, Streatham, England	
Draw	41–8–2 (1)	(United Kingdom) Allan Cooke	PTS	8	21 February 1950	(United Kingdom) West Ham Baths, West Ham, England	
Loss	41–8–1 (1)	(United States) Baby Day	PTS	10	7 February 1950	(United Kingdom) Empress Hall, Earl's Court, Kensington, London	
Win	41–7–1 (1)	(Republic of Ireland) Jimmy Ingle	KO	4	5 December 1949	(United Kingdom) Leeds Town Hall, Leeds, Yorkshire	
Win	40–7-1 (1)	(Belgium) Albert Heyen	PTS	10	14 November 1949	(United Kingdom) Davis Theatre, Croydon, London	
Loss	39–7–1 (1)	(Republic of Ireland) Bert Hyland	PTS	8	24 October 1949	(United Kingdom) Leyton Baths, Leyton, England	
Win	39–6–1 (1)	(Canada) George Ross	PTS	10	4 October 1949	(United Kingdom) Empress Hall, Earl's Court, Kensington, London	
Win	38–6–1 (1)	(United Kingdom) Bert Sanders	PTS	8	18 August 1949	(United Kingdom) Stadium, Dartford, Kent	
Loss	37–6–1 (1)	(United Kingdom) Dick Turpin	PTS	15	20 June 1949	(United Kingdom) St Andrew's, Birmingham, West Midlands	BBBofC/Commonwealth Middleweight Titles.
Win	37–5–1 (1)	(United Kingdom) Bob Cleaver	KO	7	24 May 1949	(United Kingdom) Selhurst Park, Crystal Palace, London	
Win	36–5–1 (1)	(Republic of Ireland) Bert Hyland	PTS	8	21 April 1949	(United Kingdom) Manor Place Baths, Walworth, London	
Win	35–5–1 (1)	(Wales) Des Jones	PTS	8	10 March 1949	(United Kingdom) Caledonian Road Baths, Islington, London	
Loss	34–5–1 (1)	(Netherlands) Luc van Dam	PTS	10	24 January 1949	(United Kingdom) Royal Albert Hall, Kensington, London	
Win	34–4–1 (1)	(United Kingdom) Doug Myers	TKO	6	13 December 1948	(United Kingdom) Manor Place Baths, Walworth, London	
Win	33–4–1 (1)	(United Kingdom) Mark Hart	PTS	12	11 October 1948	(United Kingdom) Acacia Hall, Croydon, London	BBBofC Southern Area Middleweight Title.
Win	32–4–1 (1)	(United Kingdom) Bert Sanders	PTS	10	10 August 1948	(United Kingdom) Selhurst Park, Crystal Palace, London	
Win	31–4-1 (1)	(United Kingdom) George Dilkes	PTS	8	11 June 1948	(United Kingdom) Belle Vue Zoological Gardens, Belle Vue, Manchester	
Win	30–4–1 (1)	(United Kingdom) Frederick Jock Taylor	TKO	7	8 June 1948	(United Kingdom) Selhurst Park, Crystal Palace, London	
Win	29–4–1 (1)	(United Kingdom) Randy Turpin	PTS	8	26 April 1948	(United Kingdom) Royal Albert Hall, Kensington, London	
Win	28–4–1 (1)	(Republic of Ireland) Pat Mulcahy	TKO	6	15 December 1947	(United Kingdom) Leyton Baths, Leyton, England	
Win	27–4-1 (1)	(United Kingdom) Geoff Heath	PTS	8	10 December 1947	(United Kingdom) Acacia Hall, Croydon, London	
Win	26–4–1 (1)	(United Kingdom) Al Marson	PTS	8	28 November 1947	(United Kingdom) Plumstead Baths, Plumstead, England	
No Contest	25–4–1 (1)	(Guyana) Jack Johnson	NC	4	1 July 1947	(United Kingdom) London Olympia, Kensington, London	
Win	25–4-1	(Northern Ireland) Freddie Price	PTS	8	28 April 1947	(United Kingdom) Green Pond Road, Walthamstow, England	
Loss	24–4–1	(United Kingdom) Mark Hart	PTS	12	16 April 1947	(United Kingdom) Manor Place Baths, Walworth, London	BBBofC Southern Area Middleweight Title.
Win	24–3–1	(Republic of Ireland) Jimmy Ingle	PTS	8	11 March 1947	(United Kingdom) Seymour Hall, Marylebone, England	
Win	23–1–1	(Republic of Ireland) Bert Hyland	TKO	6	11 February 1947	(United Kingdom) Regents Crest Hotel, Marylebone, England	
Win	22–3–1	(United Kingdom) Arthur Sadd	PTS	8	21 January 1947	(United Kingdom) Seymour Hall, Marylebone, England	
Win	21–3-1	(United Kingdom) Tommy Braddock	PTS	8	17 December 1946	(United Kingdom) Beckenham Baths, Beckenham, England	
Win	20–3–1	(Republic of Ireland) Paddy Roche	PTS	8	3 December 1946	(United Kingdom) Margate, Kent	
Win	19–3-1	(Republic of Ireland) Frank Hayes	PTS	8	28 November 1946	(United Kingdom) Ramsgate, Kent	
Win	18–3–1	(United Kingdom) Alby Hollister	PTS	8	19 November 1946	(United Kingdom) Seymour Hall Baths, Marylebone, England	
Loss	17–3-1	(United Kingdom) Mark Hart	PTS	12	23 October 1946	(United Kingdom) Grand Theatre, Clapham, London	
Win	17–2–1	(Republic of Ireland) Paddy Roche	TKO	8	14 October 1946	(United Kingdom) Beckenham Baths, Beckenham, England	
Win	16–2–1	(United Kingdom) Harry Groves	PTS	10	9 October 1946	(United Kingdom) Grand Theatre, Clapham, London	
Loss	15–2–1	(United Kingdom) Vince Hawkins	PTS	8	17 September 1946	(United Kingdom) Harringay Arena, Harringay, London, England	
Win	15–1–1	(United Kingdom) Jim Hockley	PTS	8	9 July 1946	(United Kingdom) Town Hall, Willesden, England	
Win	14–1–1	(United Kingdom) Jimmy Stewart	PTS	8	25 June 1946	(United Kingdom) Brighton Dome, Brighton, Sussex	
Win	13–1–1	(United Kingdom) Johnny Blake	PTS	8	31 May 1946	(United Kingdom) Agricultural Hall, Maidstone, Kent	
Loss	12–1–1	(United Kingdom) Harry Watson	TKO	5	25 March 1946	(United Kingdom) Greenwich Baths, Greenwich, London	
Win	12-0–1	(Republic of Ireland) Frank Hayes	PTS	8	19 March 1946	(United Kingdom) Beckenham Baths, Beckenham, England	
Win	11–0–1	(United Kingdom) Billy Cottrell	PTS	8	25 January 1946	(United Kingdom) Manor Place Baths, Walworth, London	
Win	10–0–1	(Republic of Ireland) Paddy Roche	PTS	8	24 January 1946	(United Kingdom) Assembly Rooms, Royal Tunbridge Wells, Kent	
Win	9–0–1	(United Kingdom) Billy Cottrell	TKO	5	16 January 1946	(United Kingdom) Beckenham Baths, Beckenham, England	
Win	8–0–1	(United Kingdom) Jim Hockley	PTS	8	7 January 1946	(United Kingdom) Caledonian Road Baths, Islington, London	
Win	7–0–1	(United Kingdom) Jim Laverick	PTS	8	18 December 1945	(United Kingdom) Queensbury Club, Soho, London	
Win	6–0–1	(United Kingdom) Jack Lewis	PTS	6	3 December 1945	(United Kingdom) Plumstead Baths, Plumstead, England	
Win	5–0–1	(United Kingdom) Jack Lewis	PTS	8	13 November 1945	(United Kingdom) Caledonian Road Baths, Islington, London	
Win	4–0–1	(United Kingdom) Cyril Johnson	KO	2	6 November 1945	(United Kingdom) Queensbury Club, Soho, London	
Win	3–0–1	(United Kingdom) Jim Hockley	PTS	6	20 October 1945	(United Kingdom) Kingston Baths, Kingston, London	
Win	2-0-1	(United Kingdom) Ted Baxter	PTS	6	9 October 1945	(United Kingdom) Caledonian Road Baths, Islington, London	
Win	1–0–1	(United Kingdom) Gordon Griffiths	PTS	6	11 September 1945	(United Kingdom) Queensbury Club, Soho, London	
Draw	0-0-1	(Scotland) Eddie Starrs	PTS	6	14 August 1945	(United Kingdom) Queensbury Club, Soho, London	

== See also ==
- List of British middleweight boxing champions
