= Redvers Sangoe =

Walsh boxer

Personal information
- Nationality: British
- Born: Redvers Sangoe; 6 July 1936 Cardiff, Wales
- Died: 14 August 1964 (aged 28) Cardiff, Wales
- Weight: Light heavyweight

Boxing career
- Stance: Orthodox

Boxing record
- Total fights: 28
- Wins: 17
- Win by KO: 8
- Losses: 11
- Draws: 0
- No contests: 0

Redvers Sangoe (6 July 1936 – 14 August 1964) was a Welsh light heavyweight boxer. Based in Tiger Bay in Cardiff, Sangoe's professional career spanned from 1956 to 1960 and he held the Welsh light heavyweight title from 1958 to 1960, successfully defending it on two occasions. In 1964 Sangoe was involved in a street brawl and died from a stab wound sustained in the encounter.

== Personal history ==
Sangoe was born in Tiger Bay in Cardiff in 1936. He was educated at St. Mary's School before he switched to South Church Street School. As a school boy some of his peers would later become boxers under the same management, including Joe Erskine. Erskine's father was one of Sangoe's first boxing trainers which he took up at the age of twelve. Sangoe won a Welsh schoolboy's boxing title, and after leaving school became the British Army Lightheavyweight Champion.

Sangoe turned professional in 1956, under the management of Eddie Dumazel, and on 16 July he faced his first pro opponent, Danny Wall at Maindy Stadium in Cardiff. The fight did not go well for Sangoe, and he lost by knockout in the first round. He fared slightly better in his second match, when he managed to go the full six rounds with Cliff Purnell, but he lost on points decision. Sangoe started 1957 by switching managers, signing up with Benny Jacob. His fortunes improved immediately and with his third fight he beat Egbert Jordan in Cardiff and followed this with a first-round knockout of Peter Woodward in an undercard fight at the Embassy Sportsdrome in Birmingham. Sangoe followed these victories with successes over Ken Gardener, Colin Strauch and Dennis Lockton, before losing to Ron Redrup on points in June 1957. In July he again faced Cliff Purnell, who had beaten him nine months earlier. The two again went the full six rounds, but on this occasion the referee's decision went to Sangoe. This was the first victory in a seven match winning run, which included a win over Don Sainsbury in an eliminator for the Welsh Lightheavyweight title.

In March 1958 Sangoe's winning ways were halted when he lost by point to Jack London Jr at City Hall in Hull. This was followed by another loss, this time to Neville Rowe in Leeds. Sangoe then returned to fighting in Wales, when on 23 April 1958 he challenged Noel Trigg for his Welsh Lightheavyweight title. When the two were weighed in at City Hall, Cardiff, Sangoe scaled at 12 st 7 lb (79 kg) while Newport-based Trigg came in two and a half pounds (1.1 kg) lighter. The Sophia Gardens Pavilion was sold-out for the fight, which went the full twelve rounds. Trigg started the stronger with cleaner punching, but his stamina began to drain as the fight progressed which allowed Sangoe the upper hand in the later rounds. The decision was given to Sangoe, making him the new Welsh Lightheavyweight Champion.

With the title of Welsh area champion, Sangoe began drawing in bigger fighters, but these proved a level too far. He travelled to Glasgow to face Dave Mooney, but lost on points. He then faced the two most notable fighters of his career to date. First he faced British Light-heavyweight champion Randy Turpin at the Football Ground in Oswestry. Turpin, though heading towards the end of his boxing career, was too classy for Sangoe and downed him in the third and then twice in the fourth before the referee intervened. After the Turpin fight, Sangoe took a five-month break before lining up against Chic Calderwood at Earls Court Empress Hall in Kensington on 12 January 1959. The fight was an undercard bout to the Henry Cooper vs. Brian London British and Empire Heavyweight title fight, and Calderwood was quick becoming a serious contender for the Lightheavyweight British title with wins over both Mooney and Rowe, who had both defeated Sangoe. Sangoe lasted until the fifth.

Sangoe followed the Calderwood match with a win over Ted Williams, but then he was lined up against ex-British Lightheavyweight champion Ron Barton who took the eight round fight on points. On 22 August 1959, Sangoe faced Garnett Denny in a fight staged in front of 2,500 spectators at the Eisteddfod marquee at Colwyn Bay. Sangoe put Denny down to the count of nine in the second round, but Denny came back to take the fifth and sixth rounds. Despite this Sangoe held on to take the referee's decision. Sangoe fought only once more in 1959, his first defence of Welsh title, against Don Sainsbury who he had beaten in his path to the title in 1957. Sainsbury was forced to retire in the ninth, and when the two fighters met again for the title in March 1960, the result was identical, a ninth round retirement from Sainsbury. Sangoe boxed only twice more, both matches in 1960. He lost on points to Gerry McNally at Oxford in April and then he was stopped by Jack Whittaker on 27 June at Coney Beach Arena in Porthcawl.

=== Fighting style ===
According to boxing historian, Wynford Jones, in his 2007 book Benny's Boys, Sangoe had an "impressive physique and had strong powerful legs". A great gym-fighter, with an excellent jab and good ring movement, Sangoe suffered from nerves on fight night, which Jones believes prevented him from reaching his full potential. At Benny Jacob's gym, Sangoe would often spar with the likes of Erskine, Phil Edwards and on occasional visits, Brian Curvis and dealt with them comfortably. When American heavyweight fighter Mike DeJohn came to Wales in 1960 to face Dick Richardson, he stayed in Cardiff and sparred with Sangoe. Fellow boxers Lennie Williams and Harry Carroll stated that DeJohn had "no idea how to cope with Sangoe".

== Death ==
On 14 April 1964, Sangoe left Benny's gym in good spirit to return home to Tiger Bay. On his way home he met with a Jamaican labourer, a man with whom Sangoe had a quarrel with in the past. Eyewitnesses stated that the two men got into a fight and that Sangoe "was not armed but was fighting as though he was boxing". During the encounter, Sangoe suffered several stab wounds to the chest and was taken to Cardiff Royal Infirmary. The South Wales Echo reported at the time that Sangoe had initially been taken to Bute Street police station, before being transferred to the hospital where he was pronounced dead.

On 15 August, the accused was charged with Sangoe's murder and remanded in custody at Cardiff Magistrates Court. When his home was search a blood stained pen-knife was found, to which he stated he had used against Sangoe. At the hearing, it was revealed that the fight was over a woman who was a one-time friend of Sangoe who was now living with the accused. Sir Charles Hallinan submitted that his client not face trial for murder as, in his view, Sangoe was the aggressor and assailant.

== Bibliography ==
- Jones, Wynford (2007). Benny's Boys: The Stable of Benny Jacobs. St Helens, Merseyside: Colourplan Design & Print. ISBN 978-0-9551082-1-1.
