= Dennis Powell (boxer) =

Wales boxer

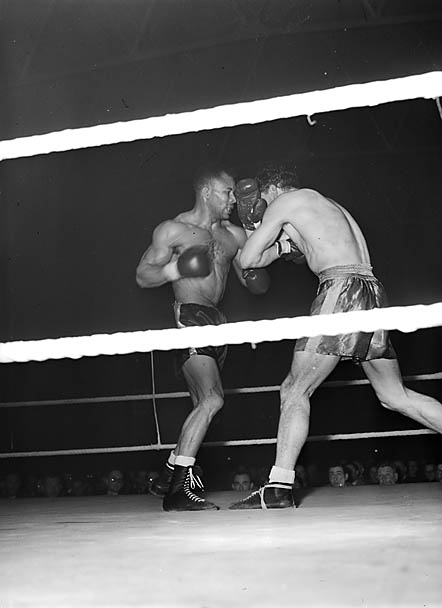
- Powell (right) fighting Mel Brown in 1950

Personal information
- Nationality: Welsh
- Born: 12 December 1924 Llanddewi Skirrid, Wales
- Died: 27 May 1993 (aged 68) Llanddewi Skirrid, Wales
- Weight: Light middleweight

Boxing career

Boxing record
- Total fights: 68
- Wins: 42
- Win by KO: 18
- Losses: 22
- Draws: 4
- No contests: 0

Dennis Powell (12 December 1924 – 27 May 1993) was a Welsh boxer who fought between 1946 and 1954. Powell became Welsh area champion in both light heavyweight and heavyweight divisions in 1949, holding onto the heavyweight title until beaten by Tommy Farr in 1951. He remained Welsh light heavyweight champion throughout his career and in 1953 he challenged for the British light heavyweight title vacated by Randolph Turpin, taking the belt after defeating George Walker.

== Boxing career ==
Powell began fighting professionally in the mid-1940s and his first recorded fight was against Tommy Smythe of Ireland on 17 December 1946. During 1947 he fought on four occasions, mainly in the Midlands and Liverpool area of England, despite remaining based in the village of Four Crosses in Wales. His early career was fairly successful, finishing 1947 without loss. He continued this success into 1948 with a victory over Jack 'Red' O'Hara on 8 January, but then lost to Jeff Morris of Mansfield who, despite having never won a fight in ten attempts, put Powell down ten times in a four-round bout. Powell fared no better in his next two matches, losing both on points, before knocking out Danny O'Brien in Chester in February.

On 16 February 1948 Powell faced Gerry McDermott, who later that year would become Irish heavyweight champion. Powell failed to last a round, being counted out. His form continued to fluctuate throughout the rest of the year, failing to string two wins together until he defeated Allan Cooke and Len Bennett in December. Those two victories were the start of the most successful period of Powell's professional career, with a run of 13 wins. This period also saw Powell fighting more in his home country of Wales, beating future Welsh middleweight champion Tommy Davies on his way to challenging Jack Farr for the Wales light heavyweight title. Farr had held the Welsh title since April 1948, and the two men met at Newtown in Montgomeryshire on 9 July 1949. Despite giving away ten and a half pounds to his opponent, Powell stopped Farr in the first round to take the title. Within a month Powell took a second Welsh title when he challenged George James for the Welsh heavyweight belt. His stoppage of James in the second round gave him the championship title and ended James' career. In November 1949, Powell made his only defense of his Welsh light heavyweight title, beating Swansea based fighter Doug Richards. He ended the year with a points decision win over Australian Jackie Marr at the Royal Albert Hall in London, an undercard fight to the British bantamweight contest between Teddy Gardner and Danny O'Sullivan.

In early 1950, Powell faced Southern area champion and British title hopeful Mark Hart, beating the London-based fighter on points. Powell then faced a string of over-seas fighters including Bernardo Pacini (Italy), American Mel Brown (United States), Jean Declercq (Belgium) and Dutch champion Willy Schagen. Although Powell beat Pacini and Declercq, he was outclassed twice by Schagen, and despite a valiant comeback after being floored early on by Brown, a cut eye forced him to retire against the Minnesota fighter. 1951 saw Powell take three victories in the first half of the year, including a points decision over Victor d'Haes, who just six months later would become the Belgian light heavyweight champion. Then on 7 July, Powell faced Tommy Farr in a defense of his Welsh heavyweight title. The bout was scheduled for twelve rounds and, unusually, was held outside Wales in Shropshire. Powell lasted until the sixth round but lost via a technical knockout.

1952 was a more productive year for Powell. He fought regularly throughout the year and recorded wins over South African Billy Wood and then future Midlands area champion Don Scott, before finally beating Northern Ireland's Paddy Slavin, an opponent he had failed to defeat on their previous two encounters. Just two weeks after beating Slavin, Powell faced another fighter from Northern Ireland, Garnett Denny. The Denny fight went the distance with the decision going against Powell. A rematch was quickly arranged and two months later they met again in Newtown, this time the result went to Powell with Denny being disqualified in the third round. He finished the year with victories over George Walker and Dennis Lockton.

In 1953 Randolph Turpin vacated his light heavyweight British title, leaving the title open. Powell and Walker were selected to challenge for the belt and on the 25 March 1953 the two men met at The Stadium in Liverpool. The fight was scheduled for 15 rounds but the referee stopped the contest in the eleventh with the decision going to Powell making him the British light heavyweight champion. The championship match was a vicious and bloody affair and it took its toll on both boxers. Walker was badly injured and fought only a few times more before retiring to become a minder for East End gangster Billy Hill, while Powell required twenty stitches to his face and in the eyes of one observer was "never quite the same man again". Just seven months after taking the title, Powell was challenged for his British title by Alex Buxton. The fight failed to reach the distance, with Powell losing by technical knockout in the tenth. He fought professionally just twice more, ending his career with a loss to Polly Smith in July 1954.

== See also ==
- List of British light-heavyweight boxing champions
