= Alex Buxton =

English light-heavyweight boxer

Personal information
- Nationality: British
- Born: Alex Laurell Buxton; 10 May 1926 Watford, England
- Died: May 2004 (aged 77)
- Weight: Middleweight, light-heavyweight

Boxing career

Boxing record
- Total fights: 126
- Wins: 78
- Win by KO: 53
- Losses: 43
- Draws: 5

Alex Laurell Buxton (10 May 1926 – May 2004) was an English boxer who was British light-heavyweight champion between 1954 and 1955.

== Career ==
Born in Watford, Alex Buxton's father Claude was from Antigua and his mother Edith from Bushey. His three brothers were also boxers.

Buxton served in the Royal Marines during World War II, and made his professional debut in December 1941 at the Watford Town Hall. He had mixed results in 1942 and 1943, ending with three straight defeats. In 1945 he travelled to Australia, where he won six straight fights at the Sydney Stadium. His first defeat in Australia came against Dave Sands in January 1946, losing a 12-round points decision. Two months later he knocked out Ritchie Sands in the first round and in May 1946 lost to Jack Johnson.

Back in England he was undefeated in six fights between August and November 1946. He had a second stint in Australia in 1947 and 1948 which included victories over Ritchie Sands, Johnson, and the Alabama Kid (twice). Back in the UK he won eleven straight fights before losing to former British middleweight champion Vince Hawkins in May 1949. Another run of sixteen straight wins, including victory over South African middleweight champion George Angelo, led to a challenge for the vacant Southern Area middleweight title in February 1951, which he lost to Ron Pudney. Another winning streak was only interrupted by a loss to former world champion Randolph Turpin in February 1952. In September 1952 he beat Bruce Crawford in a final eliminator for the right to challenge for Turpin's British middleweight title, but he moved up to light-heavyweight and in October 1953 beat Dennis Powell to take the title. He beat Italian middleweight champion Bruno Tripodi in September 1954, and successfully defended his British title against Albert Finch in November 1954, before losing the title to Turpin in April 1955, a fight in which the Commonwealth title was also at stake.

In November 1956 he fought Turpin again for the British light-heavyweight title; Turpin won by a fifth round knockout, having had Buxton down five times. Buxton's career declined after 1956. Although he fought (and lost) an eliminator for the British middleweight title in 1958, he won only two fights from his last 22 between 1957 and 1963.

== See also ==
- List of British light-heavyweight boxing champions
