= Lavern Roach =

American boxer

Personal information
- Nationality: (United States) American
- Born: Raymond Lavern Roach; February 22, 1925 Plainview, Texas, U.S.
- Died: February 23, 1950 (aged 25) New York City, New York, U.S.
- Weight: Middleweight

Boxing career
- Stance: Orthodox

Boxing record
- Total fights: 31
- Wins: 26
- Win by KO: 11
- Losses: 5
- Draws: 0

Raymond "Lavern" Roach (February 22, 1925 – February 23, 1950) was a boxer from the small Texas town of Plainview, who was Ring Magazine's Rookie-of-the-Year in 1947. Lavern had a winning record and was considered an up-and-coming contender until his sudden death. Lavern sustained a fatal head injury during a boxing match and died the next day due to a subdural hemorrhage. He was the first boxing casualty of 1950.

== Personal life ==
Born in the Cousins community just north of Plainview to loving parents Stanley James and Rosa Inez Roach, Lavern, along with his younger brother Bill, and sister Beth, were born athletes from the beginning. Lavern was a high school football star and an outstanding golfer. In 1947 he married his high school sweetheart Evelyn Joyce Ogden and raised their two children, daughter Ronnie Mac and son Richard James.

== Boxing career ==
Roach first laced on a pair of gloves at the age of 10. At the age of 13, Roach answered the challenge at a county fair in Memphis, Texas, stepping into a makeshift ring against another youngster billed as an outstanding fighter. Roach tangled his way to a hard-fought, and very unofficial, draw, and his career path seemed all but set. He became a proficient boxer in high school and turned professional while still serving in the United States Marines. Twice Roach reached the state Golden Gloves title match, falling short of a crown, but went on to win a national Golden Gloves title after joining the Marines in 1943. At Cherry Point S.C., his boxing skills were recognized to the point where he was assigned a berth on the Marine boxing team. While boxing in the Marines he was chosen, Best Fighter of World War II, by Major John Abood. In November 1945 Roach turned pro under the management of John Abood. During the next five years, Roach's career took off as he won 23 of his 24 fights and built an 18-fight win streak. As a professional, Roach rolled to enough victories to be named boxing's 1947 rookie of the year by Nat Fleischer of Ring Magazine. He then hit the big time when he defeated Tony Janiro in the main event at Madison Square Garden on January 16, 1948. Roach was given little chance against the more experienced Janiro but Roach was in impeccable shape and picked apart Janiro in a lopsided victory by winning 9 of 10 rounds. Just two months later he was back at Madison Square Garden for the biggest fight of his life – a title match against the European middleweight champion Marcel Cerdan. Although Roach won the first round, the 32-year-old Cerdan pummeled Roach to a knockout victory, knocking him down three times in the second round and four times in the eighth before a crowd of almost 17,000. Roach suffered his first loss in nearly two years which put an end to his 18-fight winning streak. Roach then retired from boxing for some 18 months before launching an ill-fated comeback.

== Comeback and death ==
After a short retirement Roach was back in the ring. After a few easy wins Roach was scheduled to fight a bout on his 25th birthday against Georgie Small at the St. Nicholas Arena in Manhattan just two weeks before his scheduled fight against Sugar Ray Robinson. For seven rounds, Roach fought rings around Small. Roach was so far ahead on points that he was winning the contest, but in the eighth round Small let go a desperation right and it crashed flush on Roach's jaw. Roach's legs buckled; staggering, slack-jawed and glassy-eyed, he hung on. When the bell sounded for the tenth round Roach doggedly came out into the ring again. Small jabbed a soggy left to his mouth then a vicious right put Roach down for a count of nine but Roach would not stay down. The referee had a quick look at Roach and resumed the fight but after just one quick jab to the face by Small, Roach was down for the count. Roach muttered thickly. "I'm getting up." But it took two men to help get him back to his corner. Subconsciously, Lavern Roach seemed to know what was happening, saying "I'm all right," but then quickly lapsed into a coma. Fourteen hours later, in nearby St. Clare's Hospital, Lavern Roach, 25, died of a brain hemorrhage at 12:50 pm. An audience of 1,832 waded through sleet and snow to see the middleweight battle in the ancient midtown club; hundreds of thousands of television viewers saw the ending of the fight over the CBS network telecast. He was the first boxing casualty of 1950 and one of the first boxers ever to suffer a fatal blow live on national television.

== Fight record ==
| DATE | OPPONENT | LOCATION | RESULT |
|---|---|---|---|
| 1945-09-26 | Don Ellis | Washington, USA | W PTS 5 |
| 1945-09-28 | Jackie Alexander | Norfolk, USA | W KO 3 |
| 1945-10-24 | Hugh Stell | Washington, USA | W KO 2 |
| 1945-11-02 | Baudelio Valencia | Norfolk, USA | W KO 4 |
| 1945-12-06 | Jimmy Grimes | Norfolk, USA | W KO 1 |
| 1946-01-28 | Artie Towne | New York, USA | L PTS 6 |
| 1946-10-01 | Billy Hearold | Bronx, USA | W PTS 6 |
| 1946-10-14 | Charley McPherson | New York, USA | W PTS 6 |
| 1946-10-24 | Manuel Rosa | Atlantic City, USA | W KO 3 |
| 1946-11-04 | Art Bethea | Washington, USA | W KO 3 |
| 1946-11-14 | Joe Tate | Atlantic City, USA | W PTS 8 |
| 1947-03-03 | Joe Agosta | New York, USA | W PTS 8 |
| 1947-03-11 | Leroy McQueen | White Plains, USA | W PTS 6 |
| 1947-03-25 | Danny Rosati | White Plains, USA | W TKO 5 |
| 1947-04-10 | Billy Cooper | Atlantic City, USA | W PTS 10 |
| 1947-05-01 | Andres Gomez | Brooklyn, USA | W TKO 6 |
| 1947-05-22 | Victor Amato | Brooklyn, USA | W PTS 10 |
| 1947-06-12 | Sal Richie | Brooklyn, USA | W KO 4 |
| 1947-07-30 | Norman Rubio | Brooklyn, USA | W PTS 8 |
| 1947-09-26 | Billy Arnold | New York, USA | W UD 10 |
| 1947-10-14 | Jackie Kenny | Brooklyn, USA | W UD 8 |
| 1947-11-28 | Herbie Kronowitz | New York, USA | W UD 10 |
| 1948-01-16 | Tony Janiro | New York, USA | W UD 10 |
| 1948-02-20 | Al Thornton | Miami Beach, USA | W TKO 7 |
| 1948-03-12 | Marcel Cerdan | New York, USA | L TKO 8 |
| 1948-08-03 | Charley Zivic | Pittsburgh, USA | L PTS 10 |
| 1948-10-04 | Johnny Hansbury | Washington, USA | L UD 10 |
| 1950-01-03 | Johnny Crosby | New Bedford, USA | W TKO 1 |
| 1950-01-12 | George LaRover | Philadelphia, USA | W PTS 8 |
| 1950-02-14 | Jimmy Taylor | New Bedford, USA | W PTS 10 |
| 1950-02-22 | Georgie Small | New York, USA | L KO 10 |

Record to Date
Won 26 (KOs 11)
Lost 5
Drawn 0
Total 31
