= Tiberio Mitri =

Italian boxer

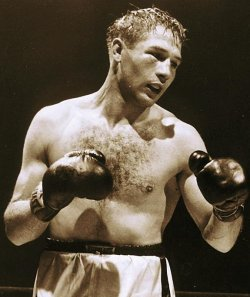
Tiberio Mitri

Tiberio Mitri (12 July 1926 in Trieste – 12 February 2001 in Rome), also known as "La tigre di Trieste" (The Trieste Tiger) was an Italian boxer who fought from 1946 to 1957. During his career, Mitri was Italian and European middleweight champion.

== Early career ==
Mitri made his professional debut right after the end of World War II on 31 July 1946 in Venice where he defeated Alfredo Pamio with a KO. Over his first four years of fighting, Mitri racked up an undefeated record of 50–0. During this period, he won the Italian middleweight crown in 1948 by defeating Giovanni Manca and the European title with a points win over Cyrille Delannoit. His first title defence was against Jean Stock, which he won by unanimous decision.

== Bout with Jake LaMotta ==
In 1950 Mitri earned the right to be Jake LaMotta's mandatory challenger for the world middleweight championship once Rocky Graziano dropped out. On 11 July 1950, at Madison Square Garden, Mitri lost to LaMotta in a 15-round decision. Opinions on the contest vary. According to the first edition of The Encyclopedia of Boxing edited by British historian and sport writer Gilbert Odd in 1983, Mitri "narrowly" lost. In his autobiography ""Raging Bull"" (1970), LaMotta is significantly less complementary. He questions Mitri's balance in the ring, first stating that "one thing a top fighter rarely is, is off balance" and then explaining how the issue accounted for the fight going into the distance, "because it's hard to fight that kind of fighter". The official scores, according to the New York State Athletic Commission, lists the three judges's scorecard unanimously in LaMotta's favour with Mark Conn 3-12, Joe Agnello 6-9, and Bert Grant 7-8.

== Mitri vs. Turpin ==
Mitri was able to reclaim the European Middleweight title soon after at the expense of former world middleweight champion Randy Turpin. On, 2 May 1954, fighting in Rome, Mitri scored a surprising upset, knocking out Turpin after only 65 seconds.

== Final years ==
Mitri lost the European Middleweight title after a three-round stoppage by France's Charles Humez. Mitri's last moment of glory was on New Year's Day in 1956, when he defeated Bill Jo Cohen after the American boxer refused to answer the bell for the 8th round. Mitri was ahead on points, at the time of stoppage.

Mitri retired in 1957 with a record of 101 bouts, 88 wins, 7 defeats and 6 draws.

Following his retirement, Mitri took up acting.
