= Marcel Cerdan =

French boxer (1916–1949)

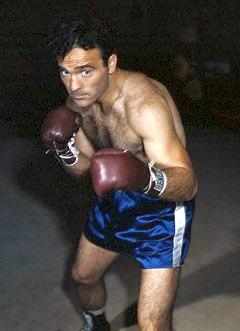
- Cerdan in 1948

Personal information
- Nicknames: Le bombardier marocain (The Moroccan Bomber); Casablanca Clouter; L'Homme aux mains d'argile (The Man with Hands of Clay)
- Nationality: French
- Born: Marcellin Cerdan; 22 July 1916 Sidi Bel Abbès, French Algeria
- Died: 28 October 1949 (aged 33) São Miguel Island, Azores, Portugal
- Height: 1.69 m (5 ft 7 in)
- Weight: Welterweight; Middleweight

Boxing career
- Reach: 175 cm (69 in)
- Stance: Orthodox

Boxing record
- Total fights: 114
- Wins: 110
- Win by KO: 65
- Losses: 4

Marcellin "Marcel" Cerdan (French pronunciation: [maʁsɛl sɛʁdɑ̃]; 22 July 1916 – 28 October 1949) was a French professional boxer and world middleweight champion in 1948–1949. He is considered by many to be France's greatest boxer ever, and one of the best to have learned his craft in Africa. Nicknamed "The Moroccan Bomber," "Marcel the Merciless," "The Man with Clay Hands" and "The Casablanca Clouter," his talent led him to France in 1938, where he became French champion three times, and then European champion in the welterweight category in 1939. His life was marked by his sporting achievements, social lifestyle, and ultimately tragedy, being killed in an airplane crash.

== Early life ==
Marcellin Cerdan was born at 9:00pm on 22 July 1916 in the "Little Paris" neighbourhood of Sidi Bel Abbès in Algeria. He was the fourth son of Antonio Cerdán, a day labourer, and Asunción Cascales, pied-noirs of Spanish origin, with roots in Alicante.

== Death ==
On October 28, 1949, at age 33, Marcel Cerdan was one of 48 victims that died when their scheduled Air France Flight 009 crashed into a mountain on approach to the Santa Maria Airport, Azores, Portugal to refuel. Cerdan was travelling from Paris to New York City prior to his boxing rematch with Jake LaMotta. Other victims of the crash included French violinist Ginette Neveu, artist Bernard Boutet de Monvel, and American Walt Disney Company merchandising executive Kay Kamen. The bodies of the victims were recovered and taken to a church in Algarvia before they were repatriated. Cerdan was initially interred in Casablanca, where he and his wife, Marinette Lopez, were married. At Marinette's request, for the matter of equidistance between herself and their eldest son living in Paris, Cerdan was reinterred in the Perpignan Sud cemetery in France on October 29, 1995.

== Boxing career ==
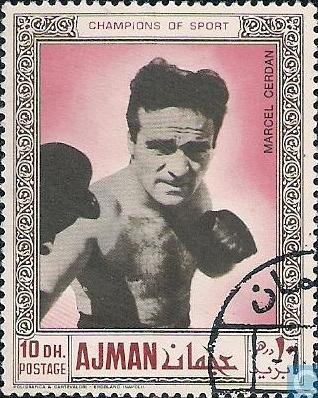
Marcel Cerdan on a 1969 Ajman stamp

Cerdan began boxing professionally on 4 November 1934 in Meknes, Morocco, beating Marcel Bucchianeri by a decision in six rounds. He then ran a streak of 47 wins in a row between that first bout and 4 January 1939, when he lost for the first time, to Harry Craster by a disqualification in five rounds in London. Cerdan campaigned heavily in the French territories of Algeria and Morocco during that part of his career, as well as in metropolitan France. In 1938, he beat Omar Kouidri in a 12-round decision at Casablanca to claim the French welterweight title.

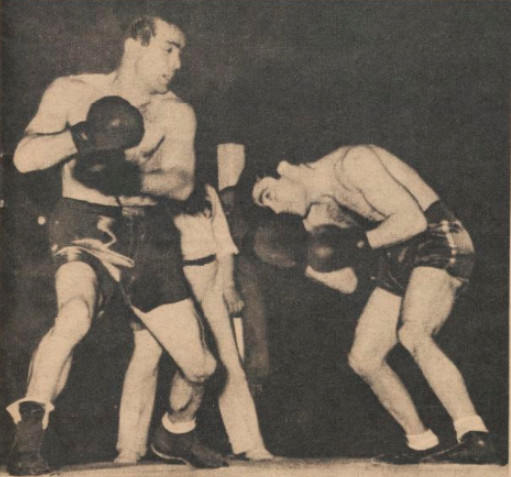
Marcel Cerdan (right) in front of Saverio Turiello (left)

After his first loss, Cerdan recorded five consecutive wins, which led him to challenge Saviello Turiello for Europe's welterweight title in Milan, Italy. He won the European title by a decision in 15 rounds to continue his ascent towards the championship (back then, it was considered essential to own at least a Continental title belt to earn a world title shot; nowadays, it is not considered as important).

Cerdan's winning streak eventually reached 23 bouts before he suffered a defeat to Victor Buttin by disqualification for a second time, in eight rounds in Algiers in 1942. They would later re-match in 1945, and Cerdan would avenge the defeat by knocking Buttin out in the third round.

For his next bout after the first fight with Buttin though, Cerdan put his title on the line against José Ferrer (namesake of the Hollywood star). He knocked out Ferrer in one round, and won four more bouts in a row before facing another boxer with a namesake: James Toney, who shared that name with another James Toney who would become world Middleweight champion five decades later. Cerdan knocked out Toney in two rounds to keep this new winning streak alive. The new streak would reach 37 wins. In between, he joined the American allies in World War II during 1944, and he won the Inter-Allied Championship.

He also went up in weight to the Middleweight division, and won the French title by beating Assane Douf by a knockout in three rounds. He later claimed the vacant European title by beating Léon Foquet by a knockout in one round. He retained that title a couple of times before losing it to rugged Belgian Cyrille Delannoit by a decision in 15 at Brussels, Belgium. Soon, he went back to Belgium and re-took the title by beating Delannoit, also by decision.

Finally, after the rematch with Delannoit, Cerdan was given a world title opportunity and he travelled to the United States, where he beat World Middleweight champion Tony Zale. Cerdan became a world champion by knocking Zale out in the 12th round in Roosevelt Stadium, Jersey City, New Jersey on 21 September 1948.

== Later years ==
For his first defense, Cerdan returned to the United States to face Jake LaMotta for the belt on June 16, 1949 at Briggs Stadium in Detroit. Cerdan was knocked down in round one, his shoulder was dislocated, and he had to give up after the tenth round. It would be the boxer's last fight. Although a rematch was scheduled for December 2, Cerdan died in a plane crash that October.

The day following Cerdan's death, LaMotta lauded Cerdan's sportsmanship, saying: "You had to fight him as I did to know what a fine sportsman he was." ... "If I had lost to Marcel in Detroit, I might have been flying to France to fight him there."

During his short period as a world champion, Cerdan became a popular figure of the Paris scene. Although married with three children, he had an affair with famed French singer Édith Piaf which lasted from summer 1948 until his death in autumn 1949. They were very devoted to each other and Piaf dedicated one of her most famous songs, Hymne à l'amour, to Cerdan.

== Legacy ==
Cerdan's record was 110 wins and 4 losses two of which were disqualifications for low blows, with 65 wins by knockout.

He is a member, along with LaMotta and Zale, of the International Boxing Hall of Fame.

In 1983, Cerdan and Piaf had their lives turned into a big screen biography by Claude Lelouch. The film, Édith et Marcel, starred Marcel Cerdan Jr. in the role of his father and Évelyne Bouix as Piaf. He is portrayed by actor Jean-Pierre Martins in the 2007 Piaf biopic La Môme (entitled La Vie en Rose in English-speaking countries).

In 1991, a sports arena located in Levallois-Perret, the Palais des sports Marcel-Cerdan, was named in his honor.

== Professional boxing record ==
114 fights	110 wins	4 losses
By knockout	65	1
By decision	45	1
By disqualification	0	2

No.	Result	Record	Opponent	Type	Round	Date	Location	Notes
114	Loss	110–4	Jake LaMotta	RTD	9 (15)	16 Jun 1949	Briggs Stadium, Detroit, Michigan, U.S.	Lost NYSAC, NBA, and The Ring middleweight titles
113	Win	110–3	Lucien Krawczyk	KO	4 (10)	8 May 1949	Stade Philip, Casablanca, French Morocco	
112	Win	109–3	Dick Turpin	KO	7 (10)	29 Mar 1949	Earls Court Empress Hall, Kensington, London, England	
111	Win	108–3	Tony Zale	RTD	11 (15)	21 Sep 1948	Roosevelt Stadium, Jersey City, New Jersey, U.S.	Won NYSAC, NBA, and The Ring middleweight titles
110	Win	107–3	Cyrille Delannoit	PTS	15	10 Jul 1948	Palais des Sports, Brussels, Belgium	Won European middleweight title
109	Loss	106–3	Cyrille Delannoit	PTS	15	23 May 1948	Heizel Stadium, Brussels, Belgium	Lost European middleweight title
108	Win	106–2	Lucien Krawczyk	PTS	10	25 Mar 1948	Palais des Sports, Paris, Paris, France	
107	Win	105–2	Lavern Roach	TKO	8 (10)	12 Mar 1948	Madison Square Garden, Manhattan, New York City, New York, U.S.	
106	Win	104–2	Jean Walzack	KO	4 (15)	9 Feb 1948	Palais des Sports, Paris, Paris, France	Retained European middleweight title
105	Win	103–2	Giovanni Manca	KO	2 (15)	26 Jan 1948	Palais des Sports, Paris, Paris, France	Retained European middleweight title
104	Win	102–2	Anton Raadik	UD	10	31 Oct 1947	Chicago Stadium, Chicago, Illinois, U.S.	
103	Win	101–2	Billy Walker	TKO	1 (10)	7 Oct 1947	Forum, Montreal, Quebec, Canada	
102	Win	100–2	Harold Green	TKO	2 (10)	28 Mar 1947	Madison Square Garden, Manhattan, New York City, New York, U.S.	
101	Win	99–2	Bert Gilroy	KO	4 (10)	11 Feb 1947	Seymour Hall, Marylebone, London, England	
100	Win	98–2	Leon Fouquet	KO	1 (15)	2 Feb 1947	Parc des Expositions, Paris, Paris, France	Won vacant European middleweight title
99	Win	97–2	Georgie Abrams	UD	10	6 Dec 1946	Madison Square Garden, Manhattan, New York City, New York, U.S.	
98	Win	96–2	Jean Pankowiak	KO	5 (10)	20 Oct 1946	Stade de la Croix de Berny, Antony, Hauts-de-Seine, France	
97	Win	95–2	Holman Williams	PTS	10	7 Jul 1946	Stade Roland Garros, Paris, Paris, France	
96	Win	94–2	Robert Charron	PTS	12	25 May 1946	Parc des Princes, Paris, Paris, France	
95	Win	93–2	Joe Brun	KO	2 (10)	14 Apr 1946	Nice, Alpes-Maritimes, France	
94	Win	92–2	José Ferrer	KO	4 (10)	24 Feb 1946	Plaza de Toros Monumental, Barcelona, Cataluña, Spain	
93	Win	91–2	Edouard Tenet	PTS	12	18 Jan 1946	Velodrome d'Hiver, Paris, Paris, France	
92	Win	90–2	Agostinho Guedes	KO	1 (10)	12 Jan 1946	Coliseu dos Recreios, Lisbon, Portugal	
91	Win	89–2	Victor Buttin	KO	3 (10)	8 Dec 1945	Saint-Etienne, Loire, France	
90	Win	88–2	Assane Diouf	KO	3 (12)	30 Nov 1945	Palais des Sports, Paris, Paris, France	
89	Win	87–2	Tommy Davies	KO	1 (10)	19 Oct 1945	Palais des Sports, Paris, Paris, France	
88	Win	86–2	Edouard Tenet	PTS	10	23 Jun 1945	Stade de la Croix de Berny, Antony, Hauts-de-Seine, France	
87	Win	85–2	Oscar Menozzi	KO	3 (10)	3 Jun 1945	Arènes du Rond-Point du Prado, Marseille, Bouches-du-Rhône, France	
86	Win	84–2	Jean Despeaux	KO	5 (10)	13 May 1945	Stade de la Croix-de-Bernay, Paris, Paris, France	
85	Win	83–2	Joe Brun	TKO	7 (10)	9 Mar 1945	Palais des Sports, Paris, Paris, France	
84	Win	82–2	Ralph Burnley	TKO	2 (3)	16 Dec 1944	Brancaccio Theatre, Roma, Lazio, Italy	
83	Win	81–2	Floyd Gibson	PTS	3	14 Dec 1944	Brancaccio Theatre, Roma, Lazio, Italy	
82	Win	80–2	Clint Perry	KO	1 (3)	12 Dec 1944	Brancaccio Theatre, Roma, Lazio, Italy	
81	Win	79–2	Bouaya	KO	1 (10)	21 Oct 1944	Stade Communal de Saint Eugène, Algiers, French Algeria	
80	Win	78–2	Joe DiMartino	TKO	1 (3)	19 Feb 1944	Stade Communal de Saint Eugène, Algiers, French Algeria	
79	Win	77–2	Sammy Adragna	PTS	3	17 Feb 1944	Stade Communal de Saint Eugène, Algiers, French Algeria	
78	Win	76–2	Harold Drouhin	KO	1 (3)	15 Feb 1944	Stade Communal de Saint Eugène, Algiers, French Algeria	
77	Win	75–2	Willie Sampson	KO	2 (10)	30 Jan 1944	Stade Philip, Casablanca, French Morocco	
76	Win	74–2	Larry Cisneros	KO	2 (10)	29 Dec 1943	Stade Communal de Saint Eugène, Algiers	
75	Win	73–2	James Toney	TKO	2 (?)	26 Dec 1943	Stade Camp Saint-Philippe, Oran, French Algeria	
74	Win	72–2	Bulldog Milano	KO	2 (10)	30 Oct 1943	Stade Philip, Casablanca, French Morocco	
73	Win	71–2	Larry Cisneros	KO	6 (10)	10 Oct 1943	Stade Camp Saint-Philippe, Oran, French Algeria	
72	Win	70–2	Omar Kouidri	PTS	10	12 Sep 1943	Stade Communal de Saint Eugène, Algiers	
71	Win	69–2	John McCoy	KO	2 (10)	8 Aug 1943	Stade Petain, Oran, French Algeria	
70	Win	68–2	José Ferrer	TKO	1 (15)	30 Sep 1942	Velodrome d'Hiver, Paris, Paris, France	Retained European welterweight title
69	Loss	67–2	Victor Buttin	DQ	8 (10)	15 Aug 1942	Stade Communal de Saint Eugène, Algiers	Cerdan disqualified for low blows
68	Win	67–1	Fernand Frely	TKO	3 (10)	2 Aug 1942	Marseille, Bouches-du-Rhône, France	
67	Win	66–1	Victor Jana	TKO	2 (10)	25 Jul 1942	Stade Communal de Saint Eugène, Algiers	
66	Win	65–1	Gaspard Deridder	KO	1 (10)	28 Jun 1942	Grand Palais, Paris, Paris, France	
65	Win	64–1	Fernand Viez	PTS	10	17 May 1942	Grand Palais, Paris, Paris, France	
64	Win	63–1	Gustave Humery	KO	1 (10)	26 Apr 1942	Velodrome d'Hiver, Paris, Paris, France	
63	Win	62–1	Fred Flury	TKO	7 (10)	21 Feb 1942	Palais des Fêtes et des Expositions, Nice, Alpes-Maritimes, France	
62	Win	61–1	Roby Seidel	TKO	3 (10)	31 Dec 1941	Grand Casino, Vichy, Allier, France	
61	Win	60–1	Roland Coureau	TKO	9 (10)	13 Sep 1941	Stade Communal de Saint Eugène, Algiers	
60	Win	59–1	Joe Brun	TKO	2 (10)	20 Jul 1941	Oran, French Algeria	
59	Win	58–1	Francois Blanchard	KO	6 (10)	22 Jun 1941	Arènes du Rond-Point du Prado, Marseille, Bouches-du-Rhône, France	
58	Win	57–1	Omar Kouidri	RTD	6 (15)	5 May 1941	Oran, French Algeria	Retained European welterweight title
57	Win	56–1	Victor Fortes	RTD	2 (10)	13 Apr 1941	Oran, French Algeria	
56	Win	55–1	Victor Janas	PTS	10	9 Mar 1941	Stade Philip, Casablanca, French Morocco	
55	Win	54–1	Victor Fortes	RTD	7 (10)	2 Feb 1941	Foyer Civic, Algiers, French Algeria	
54	Win	53–1	Young Raymond	RTD	6 (10)	26 Jan 1941	Stade Philip, Casablanca, French Morocco	
53	Win	52–1	Young Raymond	KO	1 (10)	19 Jan 1941	Foyer Civic, Algiers, French Algeria	
52	Win	51–1	Cleto Locatelli	PTS	10	16 Jun 1939	Arènes du Rond-Point du Prado, Marseille, Bouches-du-Rhône, France	
51	Win	50–1	Saverio Turiello	PTS	15	3 Jun 1939	Velodromo Vigorelli, Milan, Lombardia, Italy	Won European welterweight title
50	Win	49–1	Roger Cadot	TKO	6 (12)	21 May 1939	Arènes du Rond-Point du Prado, Marseille, Bouches-du-Rhône, France	
49	Win	48–1	Felix Wouters	PTS	12	22 Mar 1939	Palais des Sports, Brussels, Bruxelles-Capitale, Belgium	
48	Win	47–1	Saverio Turiello	PTS	12	20 Feb 1939	Velodrome d'Hiver, Paris, Paris, France	
47	Win	46–1	Al Baker	TKO	7 (10)	4 Feb 1939	Palais des Sports, Brussels, Bruxelles-Capitale, Belgium	
46	Win	45–1	Ercole Buratti	PTS	10	21 Jan 1939	Automobile Hall, Algiers, French Algeria	
45	Loss	44–1	Harry Craster	DQ	5 (10)	9 Jan 1939	Earls Court Empress Hall, Kensington, London, England	Low Blow
44	Win	44–0	Omar Kouidri	PTS	12	24 Nov 1938	Salle Wagram, Paris, Paris, France	
43	Win	43–0	Alfred Katter	KO	5 (10)	10 Nov 1938	Salle Wagram, Paris, Paris, France	
42	Win	42–0	Amedeo Deyana	PTS	10	27 Oct 1938	Salle Wagram, Paris, Paris, France	
41	Win	41–0	Al Baker	PTS	10	15 Sep 1938	Salle Wagram, Paris, Paris, France	
40	Win	40–0	Victor Deckmyn	PTS	10	3 Jul 1938	Arenes d'Eckmühl, Oran, French Algeria	
39	Win	39–0	Jean Morin	PTS	10	4 Jun 1938	Automobile Hall, Algiers, French Algeria	
38	Win	38–0	Gustave Humery	KO	6 (12)	20 May 1938	Palais des Sports, Paris, Paris, France	
37	Win	37–0	Cleto Locatelli	PTS	12	5 May 1938	Velodrome d'Hiver, Paris, Paris, France	
36	Win	36–0	Eduard Hrabak	PTS	10	13 Aug 1938	Palais des Sports, Paris, Paris, France	
35	Win	35–0	Charles Pernot	PTS	10	4 Mar 1938	Stade Communal de Saint Eugène, Algiers, French Algeria	
34	Win	34–0	Omar Kouidri	PTS	12	21 Feb 1938	Vox, Casablanca, French Morocco	
33	Win	33–0	Jean Zides	TKO	9 (10)	20 Jan 1938	Salle Wagram, Paris, Paris, France	
32	Win	32–0	Eddie Ran	KO	2 (10)	13 Jan 1938	Salle Wagram, Paris, Paris, France	
31	Win	31–0	Charles Fedorowich	TKO	2 (10)	6 Jan 1938	Salle Wagram, Paris, Paris, France	
30	Win	30–0	Max Ifergane	PTS	10	18 Dec 1937	Rabat, French Morocco	
29	Win	29–0	Jean Morin	PTS	10	21 Oct 1937	Salle Wagram, Paris, Paris, France	
28	Win	28–0	Louis Jampton	PTS	10	7 Oct 1937	Salle Wagram, Paris, Paris, France	
27	Win	27–0	Eduard Hrabak	KO	6 (10)	13 Sep 1937	Vox, Casablanca, French Morocco	
26	Win	26–0	Kid Marcel	PTS	10	22 Aug 1937	Oran, French Algeria	
25	Win	25–0	Ali Omar	TKO	5 (10)	3 Jul 1937	Hall de la Foire, Algiers, French Algeria	
24	Win	24–0	Omar Kouidri	PTS	10	3 Apr 1937	Salle de l'Agriculture, Algiers, French Algeria	
23	Win	23–0	Omar Kouidri	PTS	10	2 Mar 1937	Rabat, French Morocco	
22	Win	22–0	Maurice Naudin	TKO	3 (10)	30 Jan 1937	Hall de la Foire, Algiers, French Algeria	
21	Win	21–0	Aissa Attaff	RTD	8 (10)	16 Jan 1937	Central Ring, Algiers, French Algeria	
20	Win	20–0	Jean Debeaumont	PTS	10	21 Nov 1936	Pavillon Bleu, Casablanca, French Morocco	
19	Win	19–0	Aissa Attaf	KO	1 (10)	8 Nov 1936	Salle Mazella, Algiers, French Algeria	
18	Win	18–0	Primo Rubio	PTS	10	17 Oct 1936	La Manutention, Casablanca, French Morocco	
17	Win	17–0	Al Francis	KO	6 (10)	2 Aug 1936	Arenes d'Eckmühl, Oran, French Algeria	
16	Win	16–0	Mariano Castillanos	PTS	10	6 Jun 1936	Pavillon Bleu, Casablanca, French Morocco	
15	Win	15–0	Kid Abadie	KO	3 (10)	27 May 1936	Pavillon Bleu, Casablanca, French Morocco	
14	Win	14–0	M Ricardo	TKO	5 (10)	23 May 1936	Casablanca, French Morocco	
13	Win	13–0	Joseph Martinez	TKO	9 (10)	11 Apr 1936	Taza, French Morocco	
12	Win	12–0	Max Ifergane	PTS	10	7 Apr 1936	Pavillon Bleu, Casablanca, French Morocco	
11	Win	11–0	Antoine Abad	PTS	10	4 Mar 1936	Pavillon Bleu, Casablanca, French Morocco	
10	Win	10–0	Mak Perez	PTS	10	14 Dec 1935	Casablanca, French Morocco	
9	Win	9–0	Mak Perez	PTS	10	23 Nov 1935	Salle des Fetes du Maarif, Casablanca, French Morocco	
8	Win	8–0	Francisco Mestres	PTS	10	3 Aug 1935	Roland Garros- Marocain, Casablanca, French Morocco	
7	Win	7–0	Joseph Sarfati	PTS	10	19 Jul 1935	Roland Garros- Marocain, Casablanca, French Morocco	
6	Win	6–0	Mak Perez	RTD	2 (10)	5 Jul 1935	Roland Garros- Marocain, Casablanca, French Morocco	
5	Win	5–0	Max Privat	RTD	5 (10)	13 Apr 1935	Cirque Melburn, Casablanca, French Morocco	
4	Win	4–0	Leon Benazra	PTS	10	13 Apr 1935	Cirque Melburn, Casablanca, French Morocco	
3	Win	3–0	Perez III	PTS	10	6 Feb 1935	Cirque Melburn, Casablanca, French Morocco	
2	Win	2–0	Leon Benazra	RTD	5 (6)	12 Nov 1934	Meknes, French Morocco	
1	Win	1–0	Marcel Bucchianeri	PTS	6	10 Nov 1934	Meknes, French Morocco	

== Titles in boxing ==
=== Major world titles ===
- NYSAC middleweight champion (160 lbs)
- NBA (WBA) middleweight champion (160 lbs)

=== The Ring magazine titles ===
- The Ring middleweight champion (160 lbs)

=== Regional/International titles ===
- European welterweight champion (147 lbs)
- European middleweight champion (160 lbs) (2×)

=== Undisputed titles ===
- Undisputed middleweight champion

== See also ==
- List of middleweight boxing champions

Sporting positions
Regional boxing titles
Vacant Title last held by Jupp Besselmann	European Middleweight Champion; 2 February 1947 – 23 May 1948	Succeeded by Cyrille Dellanoit
Preceded by Cyrille Dellanoit	European Middleweight Champion; 10 July – 21 September 1948; Won world title	Vacant Title next held by Cyrille Dellanoit
World boxing titles
Preceded by Tony Zale	World Middleweight Champion; 21 September 1948 – 16 June 1949	Succeeded by Jake LaMotta
Status (all weights)
Preceded by Benny Lynch; Fly	Latest born world champion to die 29 October 1949 – 3 April 1962	Succeeded by Benny Paret; Welter
Middleweight status
Preceded by Tiger Flowers	Latest born world champion to die 29 October 1949 – 14 December 1971	Succeeded by Randolph Turpin
