= Noel Trigg =

Wales boxer (1933–2020)

Personal information
- Nationality: (United Kingdom) British
- Born: Noel Francis Trigg; 28 November 1933 Newport, Monmouthshire
- Died: 29 October 2020 (aged 86)
- Weight: Light heavyweight

Boxing career
- Stance: Orthodox

Boxing record
- Total fights: 25
- Wins: 16
- Win by KO: 8
- Losses: 9
- Draws: 0
- No contests: 0

Noel Francis Trigg (28 November 1933 - 29 October 2020) was a Welsh light heavyweight boxer. Based in Newport, Trigg's professional career spanned from 1952 to 1959 and he held the Welsh light heavyweight title from 1956 to 1958. In his later Trigg became involved in politics and was an independent councillor on Newport City Council and once held the title of Mayor of Newport.

== Boxing career ==
Trigg began boxing as an amateur from the age of nine and fought to a high standard winning both Welsh and British amateur titles, his British champion medal was awarded to him by Field Marshal Montgomery. During his time in National Service, Trigg continued to box.

Trigg's professional career began in Wales, fighting mainly in Cardiff, though he trained out of Newport managed during this time by Colin Waters at Newport Sporting Club. On 19 July 1954 he fought on the undercard of the Dai Dower vs Emile Delplanque fight at Ninian Park in Cardiff. The event, in which Trigg beat his opponent Peter Kerwin in the second round, featured several big Welsh fighters, including Joe Erskine and Eddie Thomas. Trigg continued to fight out of Wales through 1955, being a regular at Maindy Stadium in Cardiff. After a string of wins he was invited to fight at White City Stadium in London against local boxer Tony Dove. Trigg and Dove were one of seven undercard fights to the big match between Henry Cooper and Uber Bacilleri. Trigg's bout was the shortest of the night, when he stopped Dove via technical knockout in the second round.

Trigg's first professional loss came in late 1955 when he lost by technical knockout to Portsmouth-based fighter Johnny Smith. A rematch was arranged for January 1956, but again Trigg lost, this time stopped by a gashed eyebrow in the sixth. On 7 May 1956 Trigg faced Ken Rowlands, the holder of the Welsh area light heavyweight title. The match went the full twelve rounds with Trigg winning on points and taking the Welsh title. Trigg defended the title successfully against Don Sainsbury in March 1957, and in 1958 he beat past British middleweight champion Albert Finch, after which Finch retired from boxing. On 23 April 1958, Trigg lost his Welsh area title to Redvers Sangoe at Sophia Gardens Pavilion in Cardiff. It was the start of a bad run of form which ended in Trigg's retirement from fighting after a loss to Gordon Corbett in August 1959.

== Personal history ==
Born in Newport in 1933, Trigg was educated at Church Road School and Holy Cross and after leaving school became an apprentice groundsman. He took up his National Service, joining first the South Wales Borderers and then the Welch Regiment. His service took him to Hong Kong, Japan and South Korea. After completing his National Service he married Valerie and the two took on a public house, the Coach and Horses in Caerwent near Chepstow, to which Trigg also added a gym where he trained other boxers. Trigg and his wife later moved to Gibraltar, where they lived for three and a half years, before returning to Wales. After running several sporting shops, he returned to life as a publican opening the Gladiator in Malpas. After gaining election to Gwent County Council and later Newport council he was elected as the 376th Mayor of Newport in June 2008. He was an independent councillor for Newport City Council.

Trigg died on the 29 October 2020, on the day of his wife's funeral, following a period of illness.
