= Vince Hawkins =

British boxer (1923–2008)

Personal information
- Nationality: British
- Born: Vincent Gregory Hawkins; 15 April 1923
- Died: 27 November 2008 (aged 85) Winchester, England
- Weight: Middleweight

Boxing career

Boxing record
- Total fights: 89
- Wins: 78
- Win by KO: 37
- Losses: 10
- Draws: 1

Vincent Gregory "Vince" Hawkins (15 April 1923 – 27 November 2008) was a British middleweight boxer who became British champion in 1946.

== Career ==
A reserve firefighter on the railways from Eastleigh, Vince Hawkins gained his early boxing experience with Eastleigh Boxing Club, where his father took him to teach him to deal with bullies at school.

He began his professional career in January 1940, and went on to win his first 42 fights, including victories over Battling Charlie Parkin, Paddy Roche, and Ginger Sadd. He had his first drawn fight against Tommy Davies in March 1944. In August 1944 he beat Dave McCleave to win the Southern Area middleweight title, a fight that was also a final eliminator for the British title. He remained unbeaten until he challenged Ernie Roderick in May 1945 for the vacant British title; Hawkins lost on points. He won his next six fights before challenging Roderick again for the British title in October 1946 at the Royal Albert Hall; The fight went the full 15 rounds, with Hawkins winning on points to take the title. He celebrated the victory with an open-top trailer tour of his home town.

Hawkins suffered his second defeat in May 1947 to Gustave Degouve in Paris. After beating Jimmy Bray and Agustin Mendicute he fought Dick Turpin in September 1947. Turpin inflicted the third defeat of Hawkins career after a cut eye cause a sixth round stoppage.

In January 1948 Hawkins challenged for the vacant British Empire middleweight title against New Zealand champion Bos Murphy; Murphy took a points decision to win the title. After losing to Randolph Turpin in March 1948, he fought Dick Turpin again, this time in front of 40,000 people at Villa Park. With the lifting of the colour bar allowing Turpin to challenge for the title, Hawkins' British title was at stake as well as the Commonwealth title; Turpin won the fight on points.

In January 1949 Hawkins announced his retirement after a loss to Cyrille Delannoit in Belgium. He did, however, fight four more times, losing his last three, before retiring in 1950.

He married Marian Lucas in 1953, and went on to work as a prison officer at Winchester for 30 years.

Hawkins died on 27 November 2008 at the Abbeygate care home in Winchester, aged 85, after suffering for Alzheimer's disease for some time.
