= Randolph Turpin =

British boxer

Randolph 'Randy' Turpin
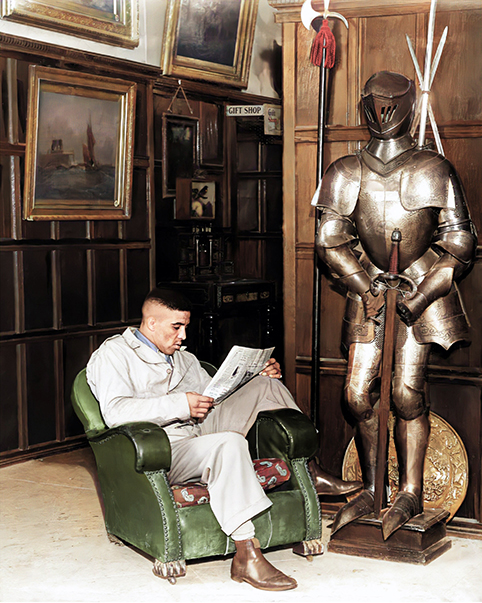

Personal information
- Nickname: The Leamington Licker
- Born: Randolph Adolphus Turpin; 7 June 1928 Leamington Spa, Warwickshire, England
- Died: 17 May 1966 (aged 37) Leamington Spa, Warwickshire, England
- Height: 5 ft 9 1/2 in (1.77 m)
- Weight: Middleweight; Light heavyweight

Boxing career
- Reach: 74 1/2 in (189 cm)
- Stance: Orthodox

Boxing record
- Total fights: 75
- Wins: 66
- Win by KO: 45
- Losses: 8
- Draws: 1
- No contests: 0
Medal record
Men's amateur boxing
Representing England
English National Championships
Gold medal – first place	1945 London	Welterweight
Gold medal – first place	1946 London	Middleweight

Randolph Adolphus Turpin (7 June 1928 – 17 May 1966), better known as Randy Turpin, was a British boxer active in the 1940s and 1950s. In 1951 he became world middleweight champion when he defeated Sugar Ray Robinson. He was inducted into the International Boxing Hall of Fame in 2001.

His life story was a classic tale of, from rags to riches and back again. In which he managed to fight his way out of poverty and become a wealthy man. However, he was unable to hold on to the money he earned and ended up living in impoverished circumstances, whilst being hounded by the Inland Revenue for unpaid tax.

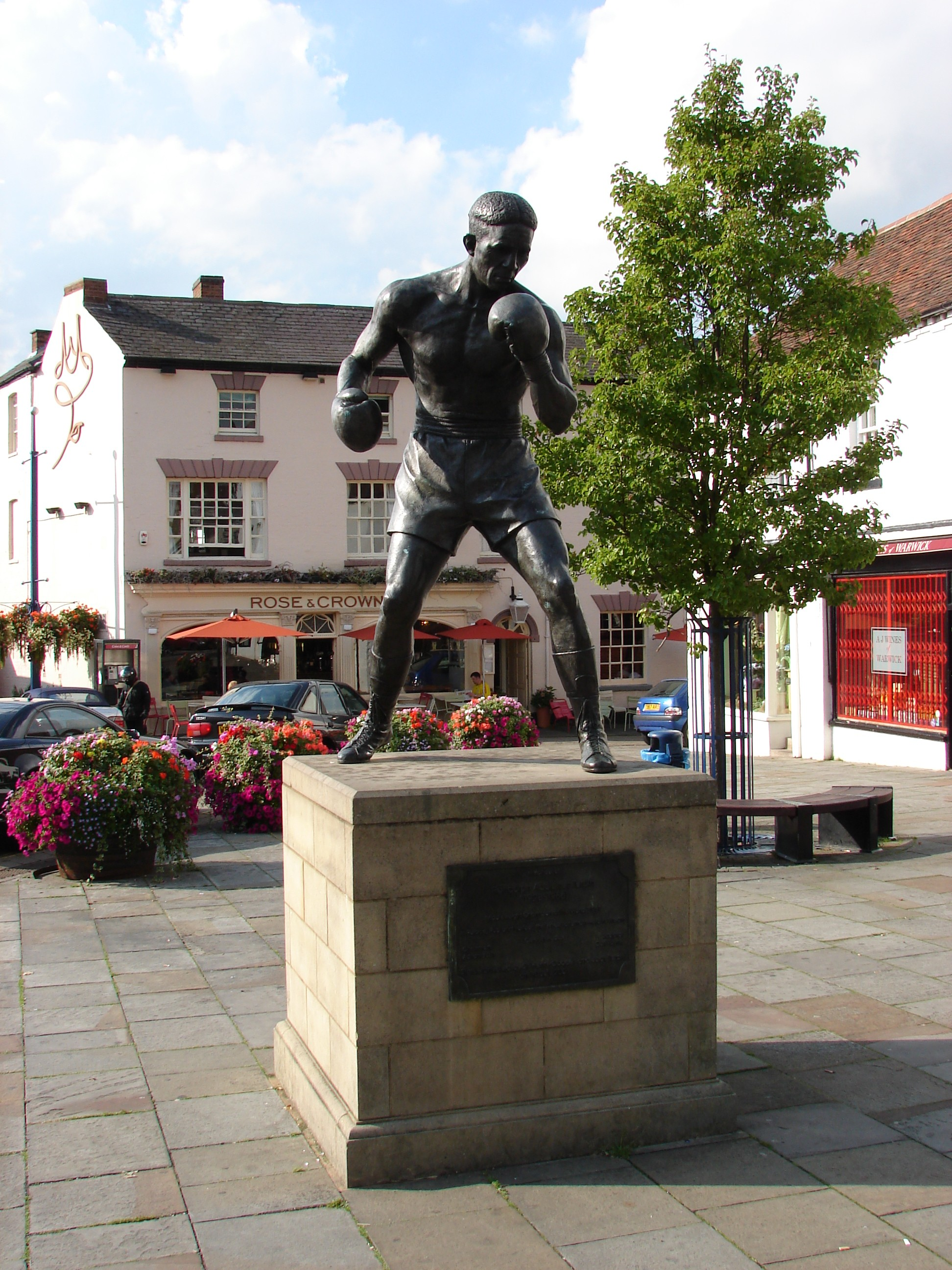
Statue of Randolph Turpin in Market Square, Warwick, Warwickshire, England

== Early life ==
Randolph Turpin was born in Leamington Spa, Warwickshire, to his father, Lionel, who had been born in British Guiana (now known as Guyana) in 1896. He came to England to fight in World War I. He met Randolph's mother after coming out of hospital following treatment for his injuries sustained towards the end of the war. During his service, he fought at the Battle of the Somme. He died within a year of Randolph's birth, having never really recovered from the lung damage caused by a gas attack. This left Randolph's mother Beatrice (née Whitehouse, 1904–1974), to raise five children on her own.

Being a widow with five children to look after, Beatrice struggled to make ends meet on a small war pension and had to work from morning to night as a domestic cleaner to earn money. As a result, she sent two of her children to live with relatives. However, she remarried in 1931 to a man named Ernest Manley, who became stepfather to the children and the family were reunited. Beatrice was the daughter of a former bare-knuckle fighter and was by all accounts a feisty woman who would tell her children to stand up for themselves when they were subjected to abuse.

Randolph was the youngest of the five children. Lionel Jr (commonly known as Dick Turpin) was the eldest followed by Joan, John (commonly known as Jackie), Kathleen and Randolph. Although he was born in Leamington, he actually grew up and went to school in the nearby town of Warwick. He nearly drowned when he was a child, when he became trapped underwater whilst swimming. The accident resulted in a burst eardrum which left him partially deaf in one ear, due to this disability, some people assumed he was 'aloof'. He also nearly died from double pneumonia and bronchitis.

Contrary to popular belief, his nickname the 'Leamington Licker' did not come from the fact that he was a professional boxer. It originated from his childhood, when Randolph, Jackie and Joan were all born in June: Randolph on the 7th, Jackie on the 13th and Joan on the 19th. When the month of June came around, because Randolph's birthday came first, he thought that made him the eldest of the three. Joan told tell him that he was the littlest. He got angry and screamed "I'm not the lickerest" (he couldn't pronounce the word 'littlest' properly). Following a bit of goading, Randolph charged at her with both fists flailing. As a result, 'Licker' became the family nickname for him.

== Amateur career ==
He started boxing exhibition bouts during the interval, at local boxing shows when his brother Dick was fighting. Then at the boxing booth when the fair was in town, with his brother Jackie. In a double act called 'Alexander and Moses', where they fought for nobbins (money thrown into the ring by the spectators).

His amateur boxing career commenced at the Leamington Boys Club and continued when he joined the Royal Navy. He actually lost his first amateur contest by decision but then went on to only lose another two contests in a total of 100 fights.

He won three national junior titles and won the senior ABA championship in 1945 at welterweight and in 1946 at middleweight. In 1945 he won both the junior and senior ABA titles in the same season. The only person to have completed such a feat and the second black boxer to win a senior ABA championship, following Cuthbert Taylor, who won at flyweight in 1928. The rules have been changed over the years and junior boxers can no longer enter the senior championships; meaning that no one will be able to match his feat. He also fought for Great Britain in the annual televised match against the US in 1946, scoring a first-round knockout in his contest.

== Professional career ==
"His typical day at this stage begins at 6:30 a.m., when he goes out on the hills and cliffs and winding roads around the castle. After running seven to twelve miles with his trainer and his Alsation dog Carl, he takes a rub down and perhaps more sleep. Then comes his gymnasium work lasting 60 to 90 minutes. Lunch at one o'clock is almost always the same, steak and salad. In the afternoon he goes out with his gun rabbit-shooting. Turpin is not quite so accurate with his gun as with his fists, he has fired 200 cartridges in one afternoon without killing a bunny. In the evening he relaxes, reading comics and oddly enough, poetry. At 8:30 comes the second and last meal of the day, steak and salad again as often as not. Four cigarettes are the strict daily ration. Turpin drinks no alcohol in training or out, fruit juices and tea are his staples. Lights are out at 10:30 p.m."

- Turpin's daily routine whilst training at Gwrych Caste.

— Daily News (London) - 28 August 1953

He was approached by many top professional managers but decided to turn professional with George Middleton, a local man who managed his brother Dick.

He made his professional debut in London on 17 September 1946 stopping Gordon Griffiths. He scored another 14 victories before drawing over six rounds with Mark Hart in 1947. He suffered two defeats in 1948: the first a points decision to Albert Finch over eight rounds and the second a stoppage defeat to Jean Stock. Turpin was knocked down four times and retired on his stool at the end of round five.

It was said that the two defeats were as a result of marital problems that he was experiencing at that time. On the day of the Stock fight he had been notified that his wife had been given custody of their son and he had told his brother Dick that he didn't feel like fighting and wouldn't be at all surprised if he lost. After the Stock fight he took a five-month break from the sport to try and sort his personal life out.

He had embarked on a weight training regime designed by a man called Arthur Batty and built up his physical strength. Weight training was frowned upon in boxing circles because it was thought that it made fighters muscle-bound and inflexible in their movements. Turpin proved to be the exception to this rule and many of his future opponents including Sugar Ray Robinson would comment on his immense physical strength. Turpin developed a knockout punch with either hand and became a formidable force for any fighter to deal with.

He went on a winning streak where he avenged the two defeats that he had suffered and, in the process, picked up the British Middleweight Title and the vacant European Middleweight Title. Incidentally his brother Dick had been the first non-white fighter to win a British Title when he had beaten Vince Hawkins in 1948 for the British Middleweight Title, following the removal of the colour bar that had been in place since 1911.

In 1951 Sugar Ray Robinson, who is considered by many to be the greatest boxer of all time, embarked on a European tour. The final leg of his tour was a fight for the world title with Randolph Turpin in London. Few people gave Turpin a chance of winning against Robinson and in fact many people thought that it was a mismatch and that Turpin could be badly hurt. Robinson had been unbeaten as an amateur and had only lost one fight out of a total of 132 as a professional, and that was to Jake LaMotta. He had subsequently avenged the loss to LaMotta, beating him a total of five times.

On 10 July 1951 a crowd of 18,000 turned up at Earls Court to watch Turpin fight Robinson. Many people listened to the fight on the wireless to see if Turpin could beat Robinson. Turpin was not overawed by the occasion and took the fight to Robinson from the first bell. Robinson had trouble dealing with Turpin's awkward style of fighting and was manhandled by Turpin in the clinches. By the 15th round Turpin was ahead on points and only had to survive the round to win. At the end of the fight Turpin's glove was raised by the referee in victory. He was the first British fighter to hold the world middleweight title since Bob Fitzsimmons in 1891. He had become an overnight sporting hero. Two days later he was given a civic reception before a crowd of 10,000 people in his home town of Leamington with the mayors of both Leamington and Warwick present.

Boxing in the 1950s was a mainstream sport alongside football and cricket and with the advent of television it was increasing in popularity. Britain was still recovering from the impact of the war and was a bleak place to live for a lot of people, with rationing of food still in place. As such, the victory of a British fighter over an American fighter who was already being regarded as a superstar in the sport of boxing, was something for the whole nation to cheer about.

In order to get the fight with Robinson, Turpin had to sign a contract that contained a 90-day return clause. Meaning that if he won, he had to give Robinson a return fight within 90 days of the original fight. The return fight took place on 12 September 1951 at the Polo Grounds, New York before a crowd of 61,370 people.

Turpin again gave Robinson a hard fight and it was fairly even going into the 10th round. Robinson sustained a bad cut and in desperation went for a knockout. He managed to knock Turpin down with a big right-hand punch. Turpin got up at the count of seven and was then trapped against the ropes and taking a sustained beating when the referee Ruby Goldstein stopped the fight. Some people said that the stoppage was premature but by today's standards it was not. Turpin's reign had lasted only 64 days.

In an article, written in April 1952, quoted Randolph as wanting to retire in 'one or two years' and go into business with Leslie T. Salts (owner of Gwrych Castle), and teach youngsters across Britain to fight in the 'ideal surroundings' of Gwrych, instead of the school of hard knocks he experienced as a youth. He planned on building a gymnasium at the castle for young boxers to train in.

During his time at Gwrych, he picked up on a few Welsh words from dating Gwyneth Price and he would sign his autographs with 'Hên lwc' (Old luck), 'Pob lwc' (Every luck) and 'Lwc Dda' (Good luck), although it is not known how proficient he was at speaking it.

Turpin fought Don Cockell in 1952 for the British and Commonwealth Light Heavyweight Titles. He stopped Cockell in the 11th round. Cockell would later go on to give Rocky Marciano a good fight for the heavyweight title.

Turpin regained the European Middleweight Title in 1953 with a points victory over Charles Humez, and was recognised as world champion in Europe. However, Turpin's world title was not recognised in America. Following the retirement of Sugar Ray Robinson Turpin was nominated to fight for the vacant World Middleweight Title against Carl 'Bobo' Olsen.

The fight against Olson took place at Madison Square Gardens in 1953. Turpin had not trained properly for the fight (the reason became apparent after the fight). He won the first three rounds but then faded badly and was outpointed over 15 rounds having been floored in the ninth and tenth rounds. Turpin spent much of the fight trapped on the ropes taking punches at close quarters to the head and body. After the fight Turpin was urinating blood indicating that he had suffered damage to his kidneys from Olson's sustained body punches.

The Olson fight was the turning point in Turpin's career. He was never the same fighter after the punishment he absorbed in that fight and thereafter became a diminished fighting force. In addition, he was having trouble making the middleweight weight limit of 11st 6lbs (160lbs).

Turpin suffered a first round stoppage loss to Tiberio Mitri who was not known as a big puncher. In Rome in 1954 when he was caught by a left hook and half punched and half pushed to the canvas. He fell heavily and hit the back of his head on the ring floor, staggering to his feet only to collapse into the ropes before again regaining his feet. The referee decided he was in no fit state to continue and stopped the fight.

Mitri had exploited a flaw in Turpin's boxing technique whereby he dropped his right hand which was supposed to protect his chin, leaving him exposed to a left hook. In his younger days his reflexes had been fast enough to prevent such a thing from happening. But as he aged his reflexes began to slow and his punch resistance diminished. In addition, he was suffering from eye problems. His eyes had become misaligned and his peripheral vision was starting to deteriorate. The British Board of Boxing control (BBBC) made Turpin have a full medical, but decided that he was fit enough to continue his career.

Following a nine-month break, Turpin returned as a light heavyweight 12st 7lbs (175lbs), but could no longer be considered a true world title contender in this weight division. Although there was talk of matching him against Archie Moore for the world title. He was fighting bigger men, who were just as strong as he was and could absorb his punches whilst punching, as hard as he did. Thus, taking away some of the advantages he had enjoyed whilst boxing as a middleweight.

He still dominated at a domestic level and in 1955 he beat Alex Buxton to take the British and Commonwealth Light Heavyweight Titles. However, in October of that year he was knocked out by the unheralded Canadian dock worker Gordon Wallace. Suffering four knockdowns in the process and announced his retirement.

He came out of retirement in 1956 and scored two wins before losing on points to Hans Stretz in Germany. In November of that year he beat Alex Buxton again for the British Light Heavyweight Title.

The BBBC stopped a proposed fight between Turpin and Willie Pastrano from going ahead because they thought that it was not in the best interests of boxing. In other words, they thought that Turpin might get hurt, which would damage the image of boxing.

He had his final fight in 1958 when he was badly knocked out by Yolande Pompey. Turpin was knocked flat on his back by a right-hand punch to the side of the head. He gamely tried to get up four times but each time stumbled whilst trying to regain his feet and fell back onto the canvas before being counted out. He had knocked Pompey down in the first round but instead of trying to finish him off had touched gloves in a gesture of sportsmanship, which may well have cost him the fight.

The BBBC stopped him acting as a sparring partner for Terry Downes in 1961. Because of their fears concerning the cumulative effect on his physical health of the punishment he had absorbed during the course of his boxing career. He had two unlicensed fights (not licensed by the BBBC) in 1963 and 1964 against opponents who were making their professional debuts and he stopped both of them.

== Personal life ==
After leaving school Randolph worked as a labourer on building sites. In 1945 he decided to join the Royal Navy's HMS Ganges, a boy's training establishment where he was training to become a cook. He was known to serve 'cold and lumpy breakfast porridge', according to accounts of a fellow crew member. In 1986 John Douglas recalled; "As a member of the boxing team, and later lightweight champ of the Home Fleet, I was selected to sort out the chef. I thought it was going to be easy, but he was one of the few who treated us as humans, he was also pleasant, with a ready smile. So, I let him off."

However, as he was talented at boxing, he was allowed to spend most of his time training for upcoming contests because of the Kudos his winning of national titles brought to them. He stayed in the Navy until 1948.

He was charged in 1945 with trying to commit suicide following a lovers' tiff with his then girlfriend Mary Stack, after swallowing liniment. Attempted suicide was at that time a criminal offence. However, the incident was investigated and was determined to be accidental.

He married his first wife Mary (née Stack, 1928–2019) in 1947. However, the marriage was not a happy one. The problems between them stemmed from the fact that they were both teenagers when they married and as such were still immature. She believed that he was cheating on her with other women behind her back. In addition, he had a controlling personality and was short-tempered. She stated that he was not averse to using his fists, to settle arguments between them.

She accused him of domestic abuse in 1948. The incident had occurred after he had stayed out all night and she had asked him when he got home, where he had been. He initially said that he had stayed at a friend's house. She didn't believe him and thought that he had spent the night with another woman. He had then told her that it was none of her business what he got up to in his own time. She stating that he had attacked her. Hitting her with a broom handle with such force that it broke. When she had cried out "Don't hit me anymore. I am expecting a baby." He had said "Well, I'll soon fix that" and kicked her in the stomach whilst she was lying on the floor, where he had knocked her. Turpin denied her allegations but did admit to slapping her face when she had sworn at him and called him names. The charges against him were dismissed at the end of the court case. They had a son together called Randolph Turpin Jr but were eventually divorced in 1953. Following the divorce Turpin became estranged from his son.

Turpin met Adele Daniels when training in America for the return fight with Robinson. They started a relationship and he promised to marry her and bring her to England. He lost touch with her when he went back home but they rekindled their relationship when he returned to America for the Olson fight. Following the fight, she accused him of rape and assault. Turpin was arrested but she dropped the charges during the course of the subsequent trial and settled for an out of court payment. Turpin denied her allegations and stated that she was trying to get her revenge on him for reneging on his promise to marry her. The incident led to Randolph falling out with his brother Dick whom he blamed for telling Daniels what had happened in his first marriage.

Turpin developed a reputation for being a playboy and womaniser during his peak years and was named in a divorce action, where a husband alleged that Turpin had committed adultery with his wife.

Turpin met his second wife Gwyneth (née Price, 1925–1992) the daughter of a Welsh farmer whilst training for the Robinson fight at Gwrych Castle in Wales. They married in Wellington, Telford in 1953 and had four daughters, Gwyneth, Annette, Charmaine and Carmen.

He had a keen interest in reading American comic books, when he wasn't busy training, he would often be found reading them on the grounds of Gwrych Castle in the evenings and when he was done, he'd fold them into his pocket, he was also interested in reading poetry.

== Business dealings and bankruptcy ==
Turpin bought The Great Ormes Head hotel with his business partner Leslie Salts. The business never made money and It became a drain on his resources and was eventually sold at a loss in 1961, prior to Turpin being made bankrupt. He had been advised not to go ahead with the investment by his manager because he didn't believe that Salts was trustworthy.

Turpin had been free and easy with his money when in his prime. His attitude towards money was that it was for spending and that as he had earned it, he could spend it as he pleased. However, he took this philosophy too far and failed to keep track of his spending. In addition, he became a soft touch for anyone with a hard luck story and gave money away or lent it to people whom he considered to be his friends. Turpin once said "I am really a most illiterate man about money." During the course of his career he is estimated from records kept by his manager, to have grossed in the region of £150,000 Which would be the equivalent of £4,000,000 in today's money when re-valued by the rate of inflation.

Prior to the second Robinson fight the system had been that an accountant dealt with the financial matters and his manager countersigned cheques for Randolph to withdraw money from his boxing earnings. However, after the second Robinson fight. He said that he wanted to take control of his own finances and his manager obliged. His manager said that he tried to impress upon Randolph that boxing was a short career and that he should put some money away, so that he would have something to fall back on when his career was over. However, he wouldn't take notice and continued spending money at a prodigious rate.

His problems with the Inland Revenue (HMRC) started after the second Robinson fight. He had been paid in cash for his share of the film rights for televising the fight. He didn't declare this amount to HMRC and gave the money to one of his contacts for safe keeping. When he went back to the person to get his money, they wouldn't give it to him. Furthermore, they reported him to HMRC for tax evasion. He couldn't take legal action against the person to recover his money because he had not declared it as income for tax purposes.

As a result, in the years following the second Robinson fight. When he submitted his accounts and paid tax on the amount of earnings stated in them, less allowable expenses. The revenue started treating him as if he had understated his income and would issue an assessment based on what they estimated he had actually earned. Turpin kept appealing the assessments forwarded to him by the Inland Revenue (HMRC) in the belief that he had already paid all the tax due to them. HMRC assessed him on what they estimated he owed them over the period and sent him a tax bill for £100,000 for unpaid tax, penalty charges and interest, for the years where he had not made the additional tax payments. They said that he would have to appear at a commissioners hearing to finally settle the matter, as it had been dragging on for too many years.

Turpin had not kept good financial records and didn't have receipts for a lot of the expenses that he had claimed against his income. Because he didn't trust banks and paid for most things in cash. Meaning that there was no audit trail. He also claimed to have never received much of the money that he was said to have earned.

The tax bill was eventually reduced to an amount of £17,126 following an emotional appeal by his accountant Max Mitchell at the commissioners hearing, in which he said: "As time goes on the punching power of a boxer is enfeebled. The longer he pursues his profession his brain through constant pummelling is numbed. His eyes are affected, deafness overtakes him and in effect he is lucky that in the prime of his manhood he doesn't turn into a two-legged vegetable. And yet no allowance is given to a boxer by the Inland Revenue for the inevitable remorseless wasting away he undergoes because of the exacting nature of his profession. Is that fair? Therefore, I claim that my client's expenses should be allowed although estimated, in view of the tax advantages allowed to industrialists."

However, by this time Turpin only had assets worth £1,204 left, and was declared bankrupt for an amount of £15,922 in 1962. Under the bankruptcy laws of that time Turpin was ordered to pay two pounds a week towards clearing his debt and was discharged from bankruptcy in 1965.

He had purchased a transport café in Leamington prior to being made bankrupt which was in his wife's name. The building was under threat of compulsory purchase by the council when he bought it. However, he still went ahead, despite people telling him not to do so. For the first year, the cafe was partly managed by Arthur Adams who had previously worked for six years as a barman at Turpin and Salts' Great Orme's Summit Hotel complex until he returned to Llandudno. Randolph put up a plaque behind the counter which said "That which seldom comes back to him who waits is the money he lends to his friends." He worked at a scrapyard owned by his manager and then started to make a living as a wrestler.

He wrestled for a number of years but again made the mistake of not putting money aside to pay the tax bill on his wrestling earnings. At the bankruptcy hearing Turpin said that he didn't have anyone looking after his financial affairs (an accountant) in relation to his wrestling earnings and added that he had not received any claims from the revenue on his earnings. At that the assistant receiver said "You might be coming in here again then?" Turpin replied "No Sir, I don't think that is possible."

To begin with he was billed as a boxer versus a wrestler and was paid over £100 for this type of contest. However, as time went on the novelty of seeing a former world boxing champion in the wrestling ring wore off. He was forced to actually start wrestling and accept in the region of £25 for a contest.

Apparently, he was amateurish at wrestling but received many bookings on the back of his name. He had only received rudimentary instructions on how to wrestle from his friend George Kidd and he was only doing it because he needed the money. To earn sufficient money, he started going on wrestling tours throughout the country and to kill the boredom in the evenings would go out drinking with his new wrestling friends. At his bankruptcy hearing he had said "When you go out with the wrestling boys you can spend up to £10 to £15 a night." This illustrated his attitude. He was in dire financial straits, but would still stand his round on a night out with his friends.

Turpin stated that he received more injuries from wrestling than he ever did during his boxing career. Particularly to his back and legs as a result of being thrown around the ring by men who were more skilful than him in the art of wrestling.

== Death ==
Three days before his death, Turpin had received a final demand from the Inland Revenue for £800 unpaid tax on his wrestling earnings. However, he had already spent the money he had earned from wrestling so he faced the prospect of being made bankrupt for a second time. Also, the council had decided to go ahead with the compulsory purchase of the property where he lived, to turn it into a car park. He had stopped wrestling and the café now provided his only source of income and the flat above it his home.

Since retiring from boxing, he had suffered from depression because of his money troubles. In addition, his personal doctor stated that he thought Turpin had become punch-drunk from all the blows that he had taken to the head during his boxing career. This had led to him becoming morose in his later years. He had become bitter about his boxing career, believing that he had been exploited by having to pay the tax on money that he had never received. Whenever strangers tried to talk to him about his time in the ring he would change the subject.

He was found dead from gunshot wounds in the flat above the transport café on 17 May 1966. He had a wound to the head (the bullet lodged against his skull and did not enter his brain) and a second wound to his heart which had killed him. His daughter Carmen, who was 17 months old at the time, also had two bullet wounds and it was assumed that he had shot her before taking his own life. His daughter was rushed to hospital and managed to make a full recovery. From all accounts, Turpin had been a doting father to his daughters.

His death was ruled suicide at the inquest. However, his family believed that he had been murdered and that it had been made to look like suicide, because he had left a typed letter written in 1964 stating that attempts had been made on his life to prevent him from getting money that he was owed and from talking to the authorities about business deals in the world of boxing. He stated that he was not scared of death but that they had now started threatening to harm his wife and children. He implied that the boxing promoter Jack Solomons was involved, although there is no evidence to back up this allegation. He had also been badly beaten up by four men. He had brushed it off at the time, stating that it must have just been some of the fans who had taken a disliking to him following one of his wrestling contests.

He had drifted apart from his brothers and sisters because they did not get on with his wife Gwyneth, and in a suicide note left pinned to the door of the room where he was found, he had told her not to give anything to them and that she should go back to Wales because that was the place where they had been happiest.

His death came less than a year after that of Freddie Mills, who was Britain's other post-war boxing world champion. He had also died under mysterious circumstances and was also ruled to have taken his own life, although some claimed he had been murdered by gangsters.

== Memorial ==
Due to the circumstances behind his death Turpin became somewhat of a forgotten hero. Turpin was inducted as a member of the International Boxing Hall of Fame in Canastota, New York in 2001. There is a statue of him in Market Square, Warwick.

At his funeral, the Reverend Eugene Haselden said "At the height of his career Randolph was surrounded by those who regarded themselves as friends and well-wishers. But he was deserted by many as he lost his position and money. The fickleness of his friends and the incompetent advice must have weighed so heavily upon him that he was forced to desperation. Randolph was a simple man, a naïve man and he needed friends to protect him from the spongers. To our shame he was let down. The tragedy is not his failure alone, but the failure of our whole society."

Following his comeback after the loss to Gordon Wallace. Turpin wrote a poem titled 'The comeback road' the final verse of which is as follows:

"So we leave this game which was hard and cruel.
And down at the show on a ringside stool.
We’ll watch the next man, just one more fool."

== Professional boxing record ==
75 fights	66 wins	8 losses
By knockout	44	5
By decision	18	3
By disqualification	4	0
Draws	1	

No.	Result	Record	Opponent	Type	Round	Date	Location	Notes
75	Win	66–8–1	Charles Seguna	TKO	2 (6), 2:40	22 Aug 1963	Schreiber Sports Ground, Paola, Malta	
74	Win	65–8–1	Eddie Marcano	KO	6 (10)	19 Mar 1963	Wisbech, England	
73	Loss	64–8–1	Yolande Pompey	KO	2 (10), 1:30	9 Sep 1958	Perry Barr Stadium, Birmingham, England	
72	Win	64–7–1	Redvers Sangoe	TKO	4 (10)	22 Jul 1958	Football Ground, Oswestry, England	
71	Win	63–7–1	Eddie Wright	TKO	7 (10)	21 Apr 1958	Granby Halls, Leicester, England	
70	Win	62–7–1	Wim Snoek	PTS	10	11 Feb 1958	Sportsdrome, Birmingham, England	
69	Win	61–7–1	Uwe Janssen	TKO	8 (10)	25 Nov 1957	Granby Halls, Leicester, England	
68	Win	60–7–1	Sergio Burchi	TKO	2 (10)	28 Oct 1957	Embassy Sportsdrome, Birmingham, England	
67	Win	59–7–1	Ahmed Boulgroune	TKO	9 (10)	17 Sep 1957	Harringay Arena, London, England	
66	Win	58–7–1	Arthur Howard	PTS	15	11 Jun 1957	Granby Halls, Leicester, England	Retained British light-heavyweight title
65	Win	57–7–1	Alex Buxton	TKO	5 (15)	26 Nov 1956	Granby Halls, Leicester, England	Won vacant British light-heavyweight title
64	Loss	56–7–1	Hans Stretz	PTS	10	21 Sep 1956	Ernst-Merck-Halle, Hamburg, Germany	
63	Win	56–6–1	Jacques Bro	KO	5 (10)	18 Jun 1956	Perry Barr Stadium, Birmingham, England	
62	Win	55–6–1	Alessandro D'Ottavio	TKO	6 (10)	17 Apr 1956	Embassy Sportsdrome, Birmingham, England	
61	Loss	54–6–1	Gordon Wallace	KO	4 (10)	18 Oct 1955	Harringay Arena, London, England	
60	Win	54–5–1	Polly Smith	PTS	10	19 Sep 1955	Perry Barr Stadium, Birmingham, England	
59	Win	53–5–1	Alex Buxton	KO	2 (15)	26 Apr 1955	Harringay Arena, London, England	Won British and Commonwealth light-heavyweight titles
58	Win	52–5–1	Jose Gonzalez	KO	7 (10)	8 Mar 1955	Earls Court Arena, London, England	
57	Win	51–5–1	Ray Schmit	DQ	8 (10)	15 Feb 1955	Embassy Sportsdrome, Birmingham, England	
56	Loss	50–5–1	Tiberio Mitri	TKO	1 (15), 1:05	2 May 1954	Stadio Torino, Rome, Italy	Lost European middleweight title
55	Win	50–4–1	Olle Bengtsson	PTS	10	30 Mar 1954	Earls Court Arena, London, England	
54	Loss	49–4–1	Bobo Olson	UD	15	21 Oct 1953	Madison Square Garden, New York City, New York, U.S.	For vacant NYSAC, NBA, and The Ring middleweight titles
53	Win	49–3–1	Charles Humez	PTS	15	9 Jun 1953	White City Stadium, London, England	Won vacant European middleweight title
52	Win	48–3–1	Walter Cartier	DQ	2 (10)	17 Mar 1953	Earls Court Empress Hall, London, England	
51	Win	47–3–1	Doug Miller	PTS	10	16 Feb 1953	Granby Halls, Leicester, England	
50	Win	46–3–1	Victor d'Haes	KO	6 (10), 1:40	19 Jan 1953	Embassy Sportsdrome, Birmingham, England	
49	Win	45–3–1	George Angelo	PTS	15	21 Oct 1952	Harringay Arena, London, England	Won vacant Commonwealth middleweight title
48	Win	44–3–1	Don Cockell	TKO	11 (15)	10 Jun 1952	White City Stadium, London, England	Won British and vacant Commonwealth light-heavyweight titles
47	Win	43–3–1	Jacques Hairabedian	KO	3 (10)	22 Apr 1952	Harringay Arena, London, England	
46	Win	42–3–1	Alex Buxton	TKO	7 (10)	12 Feb 1952	Harringay Arena, London, England	
45	Loss	41–3–1	Sugar Ray Robinson	TKO	10 (15), 2:52	12 Sep 1951	Polo Grounds, New York City, New York, U.S.	Lost NYSAC, NBA, and The Ring middleweight titles
44	Win	41–2–1	Sugar Ray Robinson	PTS	15	10 Jul 1951	Earls Court Arena, London, England	Won NYSAC, NBA, and The Ring middleweight titles
43	Win	40–2–1	Jackie Keough	TKO	7 (10)	5 Jun 1951	White City Stadium, London, England	
42	Win	39–2–1	Jan de Bruin	KO	6 (15)	7 May 1951	Butts Stadium, Coventry, England	Retained European middleweight title
41	Win	38–2–1	Billy Brown	KO	2 (10), 2:25	16 Apr 1951	Embassy Sportsdrome, Birmingham, England	
40	Win	37–2–1	Jean Stock	TKO	5 (10), 1:30	19 Mar 1951	Granby Halls, Leicester, England	
39	Win	36–2–1	Luc van Dam	KO	1 (15), 0:45	27 Feb 1951	Harringay Arena, London, England	Won vacant European middleweight title
38	Win	35–2–1	[|Eduardo López]]	KO	1 (10), 0:55	22 Jan 1951	Embassy Sportsdrome, Birmingham, England	
37	Win	34–2–1	Tommy Yarosz	DQ	8 (10)	12 Dec 1950	Harringay Arena, London, England	
36	Win	33–2–1	Jose Alamo Medina	KO	2 (15), 1:05	13 Nov 1950	Drill Hall, Abergavenny, England	
35	Win	32–2–1	Albert Finch	KO	5 (15), 1:02	17 Oct 1950	Harringay Arena, London, England	Won British middleweight title
34	Win	31–2–1	Eli Elandon	KO	2 (8), 2:50	5 Sep 1950	Vicarage Road, Watford, England	
33	Win	30–2–1	Gustave Degouve	PTS	8	24 Apr 1950	Nottingham Ice Stadium, Nottingham, England	
32	Win	29–2–1	Richard Armah	RTD	6 (8)	6 Mar 1950	Davis Theatre, London, England	
31	Win	28–2–1	Gilbert Stock	PTS	8	31 Jan 1950	Earls Court Empress Hall, London, England	
30	Win	27–2–1	Pete Mead	TKO	4 (10), 3:00	15 Nov 1949	Harringay Arena, London, England	
29	Win	26–2–1	Roy Wouters	TKO	5 (10), 3:00	19 Sep 1949	Butts Stadium, Coventry, England	
28	Win	25–2–1	Jean Wanes	RTD	3 (10), 3:00	22 Aug 1949	King's Hall, Manchester, England	
27	Win	24–2–1	Cyrille Delannoit	TKO	8 (10)	20 Jun 1949	St Andrew's, Birmingham, England	
26	Win	23–2–1	William Poli	DQ	4 (8)	3 May 1949	Earls Court Empress Hall, London, England	
25	Win	22–2–1	Mickey Laurent	TKO	3 (8)	25 Mar 1949	King's Hall, Manchester, England	
24	Win	21–2–1	Doug Miller	PTS	8	21 Feb 1949	Royal Albert Hall, London, England	
23	Win	20–2–1	Jackie Jones	TKO	5 (8)	7 Feb 1949	Drill Hall, Coventry, England	
22	Loss	19–2–1	Jean Stock	RTD	5 (10), 3:00	21 Sep 1948	Harringay Arena, London, England	
21	Win	19–1–1	Alby Hollister	PTS	8	28 Jun 1948	Villa Park, Birmingham, England	
20	Loss	18–1–1	Albert Finch	PTS	8	26 Apr 1948	Royal Albert Hall, London, England	
19	Win	18–0–1	Vince Hawkins	PTS	8	26 Mar 1948	Harringay Arena, London, England	
18	Win	17–0–1	Gerry McCready	TKO	1 (6)	17 Feb 1948	Harringay Arena, London, England	
17	Win	16–0–1	Freddie Price	KO	1 (8), 1:00	26 Jan 1948	Drill Hall, Coventry, England	
16	Draw	15–0–1	Mark Hart	PTS	6	20 Oct 1947	Harringay Arena, London, England	
15	Win	15–0	Jimmy Ingle	TKO	3 (8)	9 Sep 1947	Butts Stadium, Coventry, England	
14	Win	14–0	Leon Fouquet	KO	1 (8), 1:40	23 Jun 1947	Drill Hall, Coventry, England	
13	Win	13–0	Mart Hart	PTS	6	3 Jun 1947	Harringay Arena, London, England	
12	Win	12–0	Kouider Jury VII	PTS	6	27 May 1947	Royal Albert Hall, London, England	
11	Win	11–0	Ron Cooper	RTD	4 (6), 3:00	12 May 1947	Oxford Town Hall, Oxford, England	
10	Win	10–0	Bert Sanders	PTS	6	28 Apr 1947	Walthamstow Avenue F.C., London, England	
9	Win	9–0	Tommy Davies	KO	2 (8), 1:03	15 Apr 1947	Harringay Arena, London, England	
8	Win	8–0	Frank Dolan	TKO	2 (8)	1 Apr 1947	Seymour Hall Baths, London England	
7	Win	7–0	Bert Hyland	KO	1 (6), 2:53	18 Mar 1947	Royal Albert Hall, London England	
6	Win	6–0	Johnny Best	TKO	1 (8)	18 Feb 1947	Seymour Hall Baths, London England	
5	Win	5–0	Dai James	KO	3 (8)	24 Jan 1947	Birmingham, England	
4	Win	4–0	Jimmy Davis	KO	4 (6)	14 Jan 1947	Seymour Hall, London England	
3	Win	3–0	Bill Blything	KO	1 (8), 1:38	26 Dec 1946	Birmingham, England	
2	Win	2–0	Des Jones	PTS	6	19 Nov 1946	Seymour Hall Baths, London England	
1	Win	1–0	Gordon Griffiths	TKO	1 (6)	6 Sep 1946	Harringay Arena, London, England	

== Titles in boxing ==
=== Major world titles ===
- NYSAC middleweight champion (160 lbs)
- NBA (WBA) middleweight champion (160 lbs)

=== The Ring magazine titles ===
- The Ring middleweight champion (160 lbs)

=== Regional/International titles ===
- European middleweight champion (160 lbs) (2×)
- Commonwealth middleweight champion (160 lbs)
- British middleweight champion (160 lbs)
- British light heavyweight champion (175 lbs) (3×)
- Commonwealth light heavyweight champion (175 lbs) (2×)

=== Honorary titles ===
- Undisputed middleweight champion

== See also ==
- List of middleweight boxing champions
- List of British middleweight boxing champions
- List of British light-heavyweight boxing champions

Achievements
Vacant Title last held by Tiberio Mitri	EBU Middleweight Champion; 27 February 1951 – 2 May 1954	Succeeded by Tiberio Mitri
Preceded by Sugar Ray Robinson	World Middleweight Champion; 10 July 1951 – 12 September 1951	Succeeded by Sugar Ray Robinson
Titles in pretence
Vacant Title last held by Les Darcy; Australian recognition	World Middleweight Champion; BBBC recognition 9 June – 21 October 1953; Lost bid for undisputed title	Vacant Title next held by Marvelous Marvin Hagler; Recognised in some states
Middleweight status
Preceded by Marcel Cerdan	Latest born world champion to die 17 May 1966 – 14 December 1971	Succeeded by Dick Tiger
