= Billy Wood =

Australian rules footballer, born 1905

Personal information
- Full name: Billy Wood
- Born: 31 August 1905
- Died: 14 November 1975 (aged 70)
- Original team: Northcote

Playing career^{1}
Years	Club	Games (Goals)
1928	Carlton	7 (0)
- ^{1} Playing statistics correct to the end of 1928.

Billy Wood (31 August 1905 – 14 November 1975) was an Australian rules footballer who played with Carlton in the Victorian Football League (VFL).
