= Bos Murphy =

New Zealand boxer

Personal information
- Nationality: New Zealander
- Born: Richard Boswell Murphy; 14 February 1924 Palmerston North, New Zealand
- Died: 9 November 2000 (aged 76) Silverstream, New Zealand
- Height: 5 ft 11 1/2 in (1.82 m)
- Weight: welter/middle/light heavyweight

Boxing career
- Reach: 73 in (185 cm)

Boxing record
- Total fights: 51
- Wins: 30 (KO 10)
- Losses: 19 (KO 6)
- Draws: 1
- No contests: 1

Richard Boswell "Bos" Murphy (14 February 1924 – 9 November 2000) was a New Zealand professional welter/middle/light heavyweight boxer of the 1940s and 1950s who won the New Zealand Boxing Association welterweight title, Australasian welterweight title, and British Empire middleweight title. His professional fighting weight varied from 143 1/2 lb (65.1 kg; 10 st 3.5 lb), i.e. welterweight to 166 1/4 lb (75.4 kg; 11 st 12.3 lb), i.e. light heavyweight.

Murphy died at Silverstream in 2000 and was buried at Akatarawa Cemetery.
