= Gordon Wallace (boxer) =

Canadian boxer

Personal information
- Born: 27 January 1929 Creighton Mine, Ontario, Canada
- Died: 26 November 2015 (aged 86) Brantford, Ontario, Canada
- Weight: middle/light heavyweight

Boxing career
- Stance: Orthodox

Boxing record
- Total fights: 49
- Wins: 32 (KO 15)
- Losses: 17 (KO 2)
- Draws: 3
- No contests: 1

Gordon Raymond Wallace (27 January 1929 – 26 November 2015) was a Canadian professional middle/light heavyweight boxer of the 1950s who won the British Empire light heavyweight title, and was a challenger for the Canada light heavyweight title on four occasions against Yvon Durelle, his professional fighting weight varied from 160 lb (73 kg; 11 st 6 lb), i.e. middleweight to 169 lb (77 kg; 12 st 1 lb), i.e. light heavyweight.
