= Cyrille Delannoit =

Belgian boxer

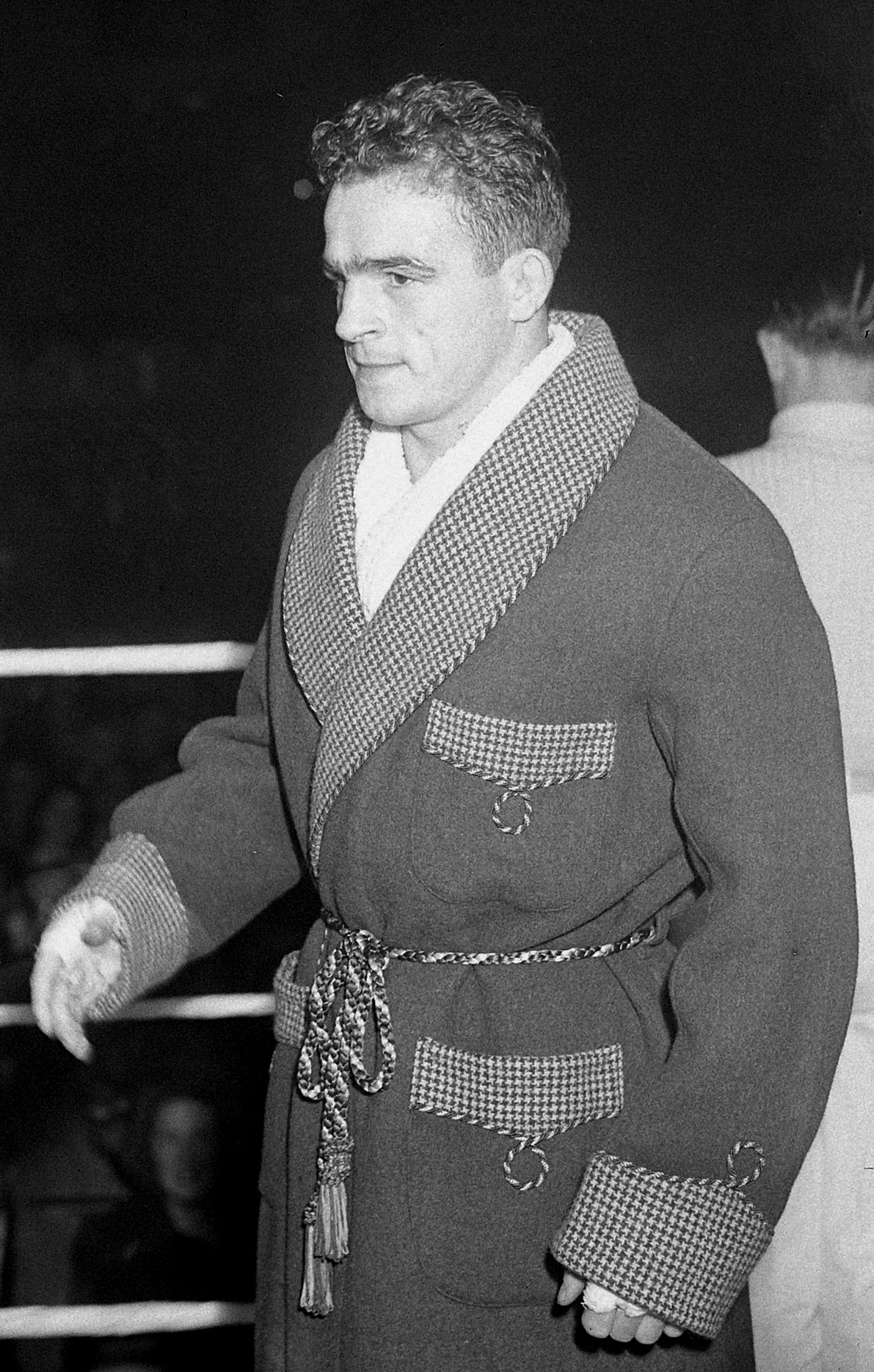
Cyrille Delannoit in 1948

Cyrille Delannoit (alternatively Cyriel Delannoit; Geraardsbergen, 13 March 1926 – 9 February 1998) was a Belgian boxer. He was also known by his nickname Tarzan. In 1948, he became European boxing champion in the middleweight class.

== Boxing career ==
Delannoit came from a working-class family with 12 children from a working-class neighborhood. Of the 7 sons, three were boxers. Cyriel, known for his powerful punch was certainly the most famous of the brothers and Belgian champion in 1947. On 23 May 1948, he defeated reigning European champion middleweight Marcel Cerdan in a fight in Heysel Stadium in Brussels in front of 20,000 spectators. The victory by a decision in 15 rounds was all the more remarkable because it was the first defeat of Cerdan in 105 boxing fights. Cerdan however won the rematch on 10 July 1948 less than two months later again by a decision.

Cyriel Delannoit continued his achievements by recapturing the title again in November 1948 after a win on points against Dutch boxer Luc van Dam.

In 1949 he lost back the title to the Italian boxer Tiberio Mitri. On 1 July 1951, he lost a crucial game to world champion Sugar Ray Robinson in 3rd round. Delannoit's shining days had finished despite further matches.

In 1951, he appeared briefly in the film Ah! Qu'il fait bon chez nous acting as himself.

Delannoit left his residence in Geraardsbergen to live in Brussels, living there for more than 20 years. At the end of the 1970s he returned to his hometown, completely destitute, and in need of social welfare for him and his family. He died in poverty in 1998 after a long illness.

== Legacy ==
The life story of Cyriel Delannoit has been a source of inspiration for various scripts and films. Fernand Handtpoorter wrote the story of Delannoit for a documentary about him. The Belgian television series Koning van de Wereld (meaning King of the world) was partly based on the life story of the boxer.

In 2005 he was nominated for The Greatest Belgian but finishing at 321 in the final listing.

Boxer turned artist Jean-Pierre Coopman was commissioned to sculpt a statue of Cyriel Delannoit based on his famous win over Marcel Cerdan.
