= Joe Louis vs. Max Schmeling =

Boxing match

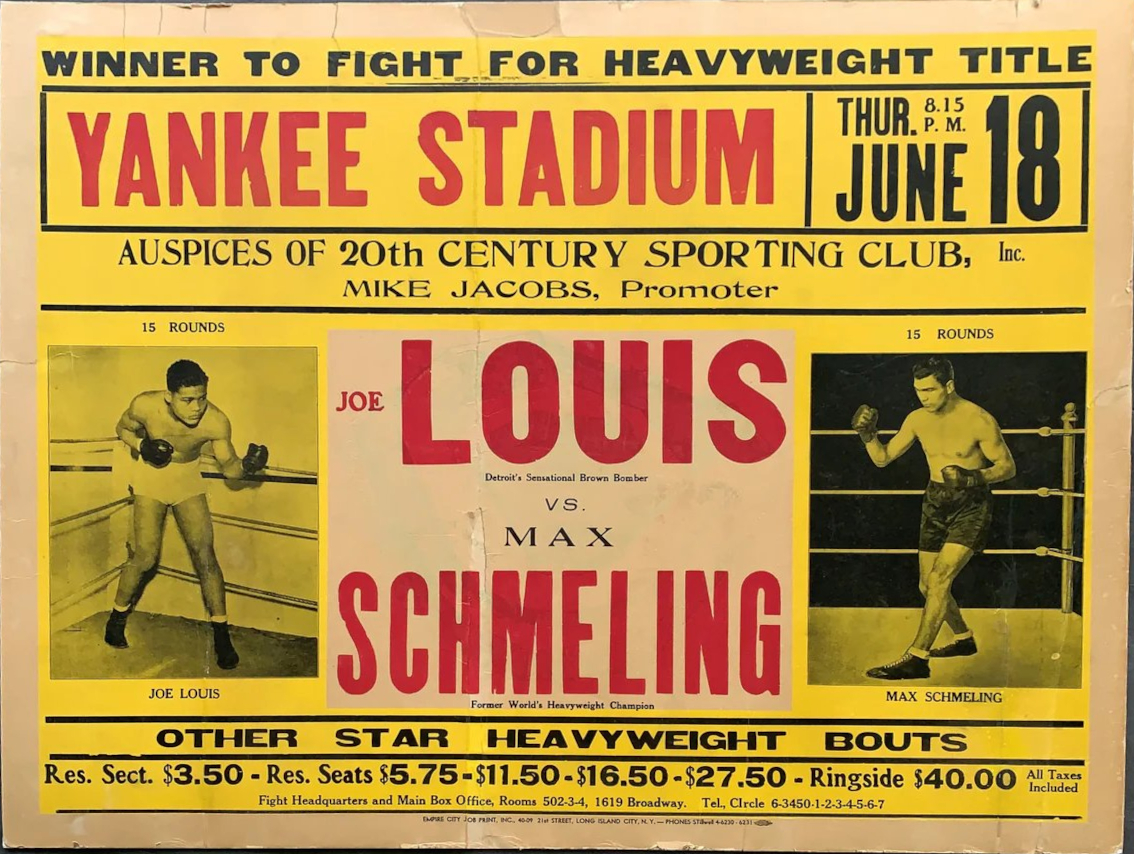
- Date: June 19, 1936
- Venue: Yankee Stadium, New York City, New York, U.S.

Tale of the tape
Boxer	(United States) Joe Louis	(Nazi Germany) Max Schmeling
Nickname	"The Brown Bomber"	"Black Uhlan of the Rhine"
Hometown	Detroit, Michigan, U.S.	Klein Luckow, Brandenburg, Germany
Pre-fight record	24–0 (21 KO)	48–7–4 (34 KO)
Age	22 years, 1 month	30 years, 8 months
Height	6 ft 1 1/2 in (187 cm)	6 ft 1 in (185 cm)
Weight	198 lb (90 kg)	192 lb (87 kg)
Style	Orthodox	Orthodox
Recognition	NBA/The Ring; No. 1 Ranked Heavyweight	NBA; No. 2 Ranked Heavyweight; The Ring; No. 3 Ranked Heavyweight; Former undisputed heavyweight champion

Result
- Schmeling defeats Louis by 12th round KO

Joe Louis vs. Max Schmeling was a professional boxing match contested on June 19, 1936.

== Background ==
Joe Louis was born in Alabama, but lived much of his early years in Detroit. As a successful African American professional in the northern part of the country, Louis was seen by many other Americans as a symbol of the liberated black man. Since becoming a professional heavyweight, Louis amassed a record of 24–0 and was considered invincible heading into his first bout with Schmeling in 1936. Louis' celebrity was particularly important for African Americans of the era, who were not only suffering economically along with the rest of the country but also were the targets of significant racially motivated violence, particularly in Southern states by members of the Ku Klux Klan. By the time of the Louis-Schmeling match, Schmeling was thought of as the final stepping stone to Louis' eventual title bid.

Max Schmeling, on the other hand, was born in Germany, and he had become the first world heavyweight champion to win the title by disqualification in 1930, against American Jack Sharkey. One year later, Schmeling retained his title by a Round 15 knockout against William Stribling. Later Schmeling lost the title in a rematch with Sharkey by a very controversial decision in 1932. As a result, Schmeling was well known to American boxing fans and was still considered the No. 2 contender for James Braddock's heavyweight title in 1936. Nevertheless, many boxing fans considered Schmeling, 30 years old by the time of his first match with Louis, to be on the decline and not a serious challenge for the Brown Bomber.

Perhaps, as a result, Louis took training for the Schmeling fight none too seriously. Louis' training retreat was at Lakewood, New Jersey, where Louis was introduced to the game of golf – later to become a lifelong passion. Louis spent significant time on the golf course rather than training. Conversely, Schmeling prepared intently for the bout. Schmeling had thoroughly studied Louis's style, and believed he had found a weakness: Louis's habit of dropping his left hand low after a jab.

Although the political aspect of the first Louis-Schmeling bout would later be dwarfed by the crucible of the later 1938 rematch, brewing political sentiment would inevitably attach itself to the fight. Adolf Hitler had become chancellor of Germany three years previously and, although the United States and Germany were not yet political or military enemies, there was some tension building among the two countries as the Nazi Party began asserting its supremacist ideologies. Schmeling's Jewish manager, Joe Jacobs, set up Schmeling's training at a Jewish resort in the Catskills.

== The fight ==
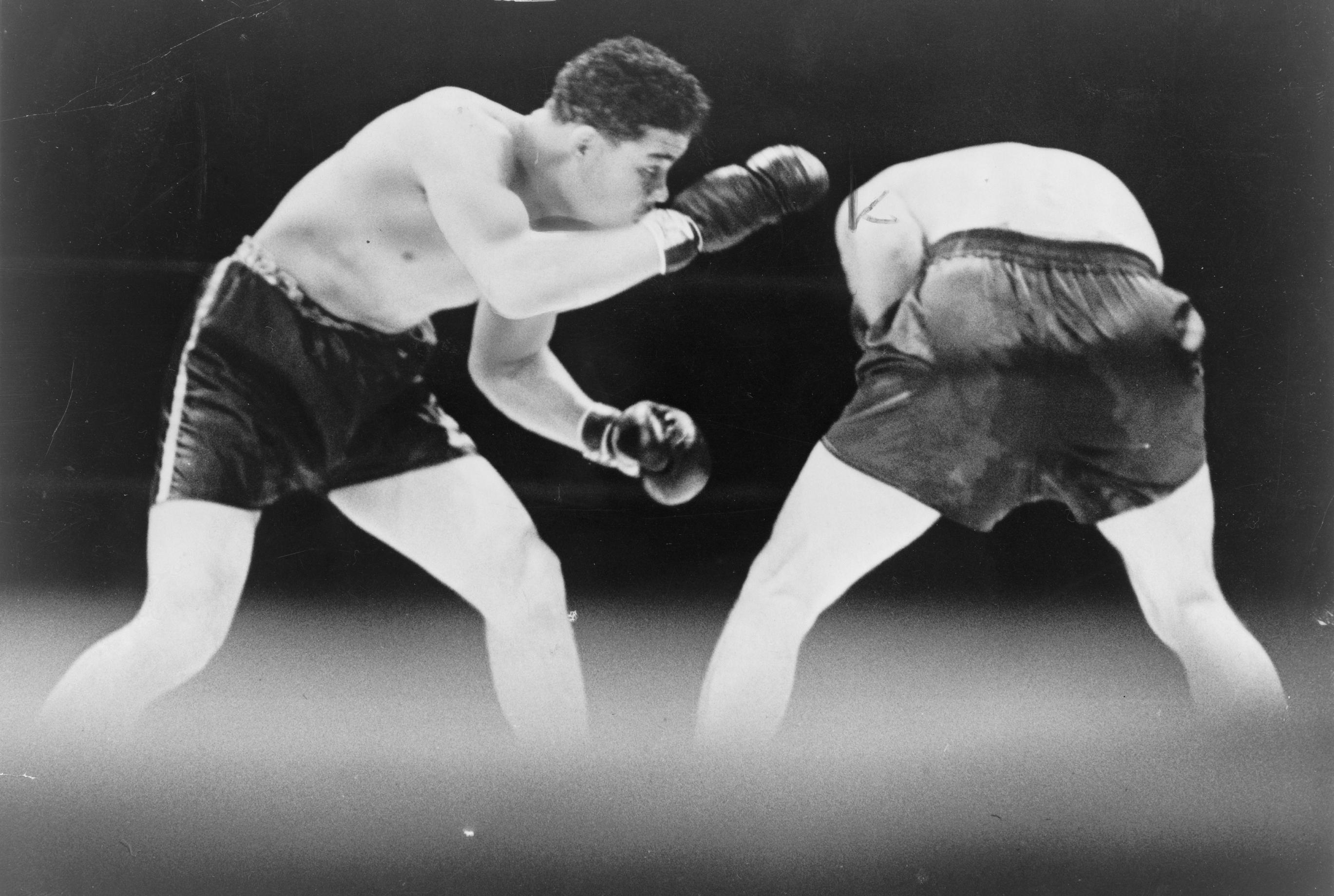
A moment of the fight

The first fight between Louis and Schmeling took place on June 19, 1936, at the famous Yankee Stadium in Bronx, New York. The referee was the legendary Arthur Donovan, and the stadium's seats were sold out. The bout was scheduled for fifteen rounds. 70 million people listened on their radios. Schmeling was a 10-1 underdog.

Schmeling's study of Louis' style led him to openly say, in days before the fight, that he had found the key to victory; fans thought that he was just trying to raise interest in the fight. Nevertheless, boxing fans still wanted to see the rising star against the famed former world champion.

Schmeling spent the first three rounds using his jab while sneaking his right cross behind his jab. Louis was stunned by his rival's style. In the fourth round, a snapping right landed on Louis' chin, and Louis was sent to the canvas for the first time in his twenty-eight professional fights. As the fight progressed, stunned fans and critics alike watched Schmeling continue to use this style effectively, and Louis had no idea how to solve the puzzle.

As rounds went by, Louis suffered various injuries, including one to the eye. Louis remained busy, trying to land a punch that would give him a knockout victory, but, with eyesight trouble and Schmeling's jab constantly in his face, this proved impossible.

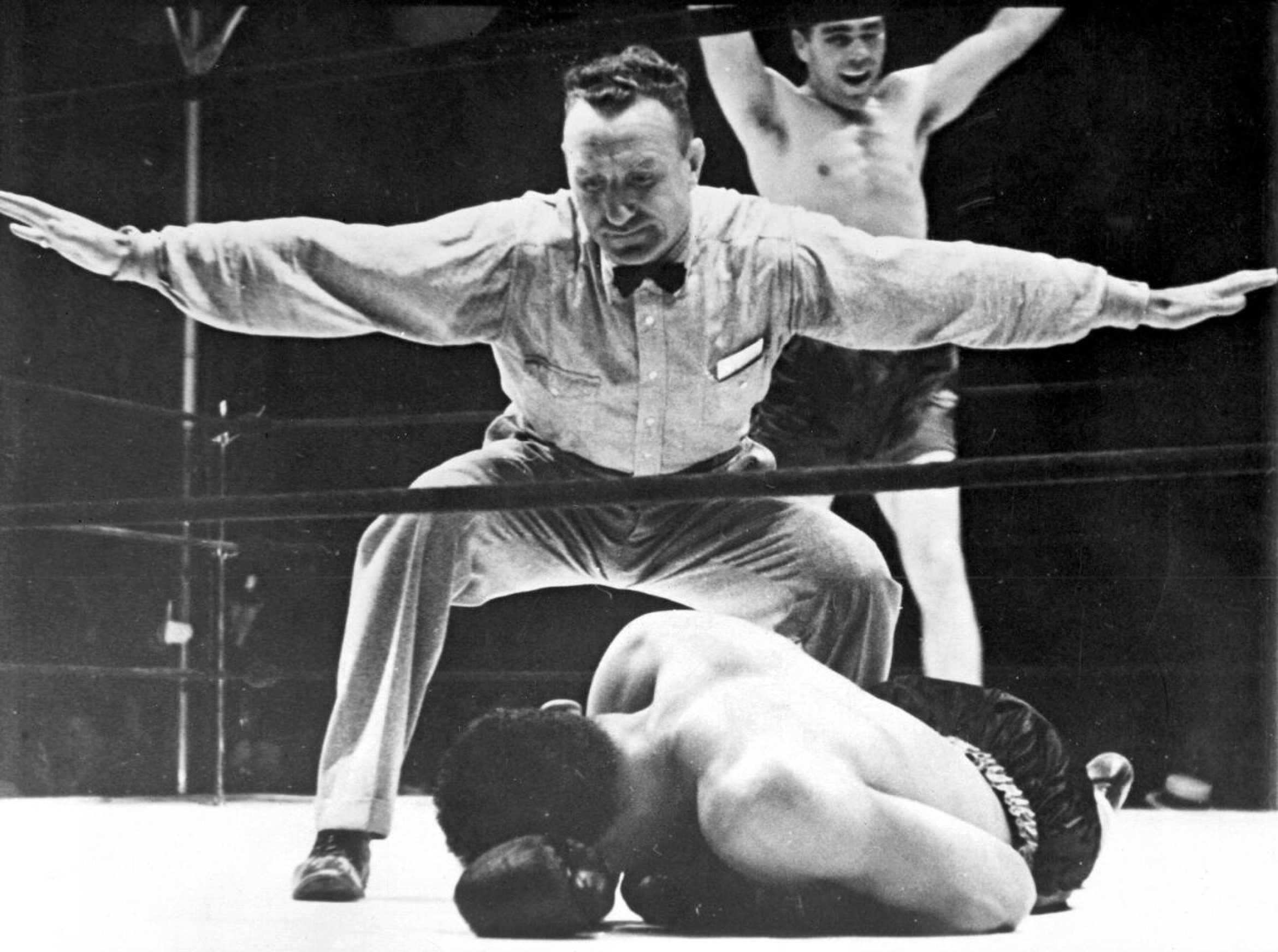
Louis is counted out

By round twelve, Schmeling was far ahead on the judges' scorecards. Finally, he landed a right to Louis' body, followed by another right hand, this one to the jaw. Louis fell near his corner and was counted out by Donovan. This was Louis' only knockout defeat during his first run: the only other knockout happened when Rocky Marciano knocked Louis out fifteen years later. By then, Louis was considered a faded champion and Marciano a rising star.

== Aftermath ==
Among the attendees at Louis' defeat was Langston Hughes, a major figure in the Harlem Renaissance and noted literary figure. Hughes described the national reaction to Louis' defeat in these terms:

I walked down Seventh Avenue and saw grown men weeping like children, and women sitting in the curbs with their heads in their hands. All across the country that night when the news came that Joe was knocked out, people cried.

Conversely, the German reaction to the outcome was jubilant. Hitler contacted Schmeling's wife, sending her flowers and a message: "For the wonderful victory of your husband, our greatest German boxer, I must congratulate you with all my heart." Schmeling dutifully reciprocated with nationalistic comments for the German press, telling a German reporter after the fight:

At this moment I have to tell Germany, I have to report to the Fuehrer in particular, that the thoughts of all my countrymen were with me in this fight; that the Fuehrer and his faithful people were thinking of me. This thought gave me the strength to succeed in this fight. It gave me the courage and the endurance to win this victory for Germany's colors.

== Undercard ==
Confirmed bouts:

== Legacy ==
The two fights came to embody the broader political and social conflict of the time. As the most significant African American athlete of his age and the most successful black fighter since Jack Johnson, Louis was a focal point for African American interest in the 1930s. Moreover, as a contest between representatives of the United States and Nazi Germany during the 1930s, the fights came to symbolize the struggle between democracy and fascism.

== Louis–Schmeling paradox ==
The rivalry between Louis and Schmeling gave rise to the Louis–Schmeling paradox, a concept in sports economics. It was first identified and named by Walter C. Neale, in his article "The peculiar economics of professional sports", published in the Quarterly Journal of Economics in February 1964. The paradox, as identified by Neale, is that the general rule that monopoly is the "ideal market position of a firm" does not hold for professional sports. Where non-sporting firms are "better off the smaller or less important the competition", sporting firms require competitors to be successful: if Joe Louis had had no competitors, he "would have had no one to fight and therefore no income". Neale resolved the paradox by drawing a distinction between sporting competition and market competition, holding that "the firm in law, as organized in the sporting world, is not the firm of economic analysis".

The paradox is sometimes re-stated as "commercial sporting organizations need close competition if they are to be able to maximize their income", as a result of Neale's further conclusion that "demand for competition will decrease if the spectators can predict the outcome of the game". However, this has been challenged by Roger G. Noll, who noted in the Oxford Review of Economic Policy in 2003 that "a team that has dropped out of contentions for a championship will generally draw poorly, but it is likely to sell more tickets if it is playing a team that is at or near that top of the standings than if it is playing another weak team, even though the outcome of the latter game is more uncertain".

== See also ==
- Joe and Max (2002 film)

== Notes ==
Preceded by vs. Charley Retzlaff	Joe Louis's bouts 19 June 1936	Succeeded by vs. Jack Sharkey
Preceded by vs. Paulino Uzcudun	Max Schmeling's bouts 19 June 1936	Succeeded by vs. Harry Thomas
