= Joe and Max =

- DVD cover
- Written by: Jason Horwitch
- Directed by: Steve James
- Starring: Leonard Roberts; Til Schweiger; Peta Wilson
- Theme music composer: Jeff Beal
- Countries of origin: United States; Germany
- Original language: English

Production
- Executive producers: Mike Karz; Brad Krevoy; Klaus Rettig; Gerhard Schmidt
- Producers: Brad Krevoy; Klaus Rettig; Kelli Konop
- Cinematography: Bill Butler
- Editor: Norman Buckley
- Running time: 109 minutes
- Production companies: Starz! Pictures; Karz Entertainment; Motion Picture Corporation of America

Original release
- Release: 3 March 2002

Joe and Max is a 2002 American-German boxing film directed by Steve James and based on the true story of the two boxing matches between American Joe Louis and German Max Schmeling.

== Plot ==
In 1936, African American boxer Joe Louis, trained by Jack Blackburn, is undefeated and apparently invincible. Then Jewish-American boxing manager Joe Jacobs obtains a film of his fight against Paulino Uzcudun in Madison Square Garden. Jacobs delivers the film to his client, German heavyweight champion Max Schmeling. A pioneer of video analysis, Schmeling discovers how Louis always neglects his guard when he has just delivered a certain blow. Schmeling decides to seek a fight with Louis. The next year they fight in the United States. The German, who is nine years Louis's senior, surprises everybody by winning.

The German boxer returns home. The reigning Nazi government strive to exploit his coup for their propaganda, but he refuses to sign a treatise supporting the Nazi line because for him it is unthinkable to comply with the racial policy of Nazi Germany. Only his currently huge popularity saves him from their wrath. Moreover, Schmeling is allowed to keep his manager despite all the discrimination Jews are facing in Germany at this time. Nevertheless, Hitler himself forces Schmeling to sign the Nazi treatise at last.

Schmeling feels that he owes Louis a rematch. This time the American audience is completely against Schmeling because the Nazis have succeeded in using him in their propaganda. Right at the beginning of this fight Schmeling is hit in the lumbar region and suffers a spinal injury. Unable to keep on fighting he must forfeit. Joe Louis visits him after the fight when Schmeling is being treated in a hospital.

Joe Jacobs remains in USA when Schmeling returns home again. Schmeling's wife, Anny Ondra, waits for him at the airport; but this time there is nobody else to receive him. Joe's fate is exactly the opposite. He is revered by the public, but his wife Marva leaves him because she can't deal with the effect this has on him. Meanwhile in Germany, the Kristallnacht takes place. Max Schmeling and Anny Ondra hide his Jewish tailor in their house. In the end only Anny Ondra's aptitude as an actress saves their lives. Even so, Max Schmeling never agrees to become a member of the ruling Nazi party. Eventually he has to serve as a soldier in the Fallschirmjäger while Joe Louis does exhibition fights for the United States Army.

After the war both boxers face personal difficulties. Schmeling's house in Germany is destroyed. Joe Louis has problems with the Internal Revenue Service. Both are clearly past their prime, but still they have to return to the boxing ring. Max Schmeling is eventually lucky because an American boxing official remembers him when Coca-Cola is looking for an appropriate representative in Germany. With Anny Ondra's approval, he accepts the offered position. When Schmeling travels to America on a business trip, he visits the divorced and impoverished Joe Louis. They remain friends for the rest of their lives.

== Reception ==
Critics judged the DVD was worthwhile watching for boxing fans although the film had palpably been made for TV. Also, the film's message was praised.

== See also ==
- Max Schmeling (film)
- List of boxing films
