= Joe Louis vs. Max Schmeling II =

Boxing match

- Date: June 22, 1938
- Venue: Yankee Stadium, New York City, New York, U.S.
- Titles on the line: NYSAC, NBA and The Ring undisputed heavyweight championship

Tale of the tape
Boxer	(United States) Joe Louis	(Nazi Germany) Max Schmeling
Nickname	"The Brown Bomber"	"Black Uhlan of the Rhine"
Hometown	Detroit, Michigan, U.S.	Klein Luckow, Brandenburg, Germany
Pre-fight record	35–1 (30 KO)	52–7–4 (37 KO)
Age	24 years, 1 month	32 years, 8 months
Height	6 ft 1 1/2 in (187 cm)	6 ft 1 in (185 cm)
Weight	198 3/4 lb (90 kg)	193 lb (88 kg)
Style	Orthodox	Orthodox
Recognition	NYSAC, NBA, and The Ring; Undisputed Heavyweight Champion	NBA/The Ring; No. 1 Ranked Heavyweight; Former undisputed heavyweight champion

Result
- Louis defeats Schmeling by 1st round KO

Joe Louis vs. Max Schmeling II was a professional boxing match contested on June 22, 1938, for the undisputed heavyweight championship.

== Background ==
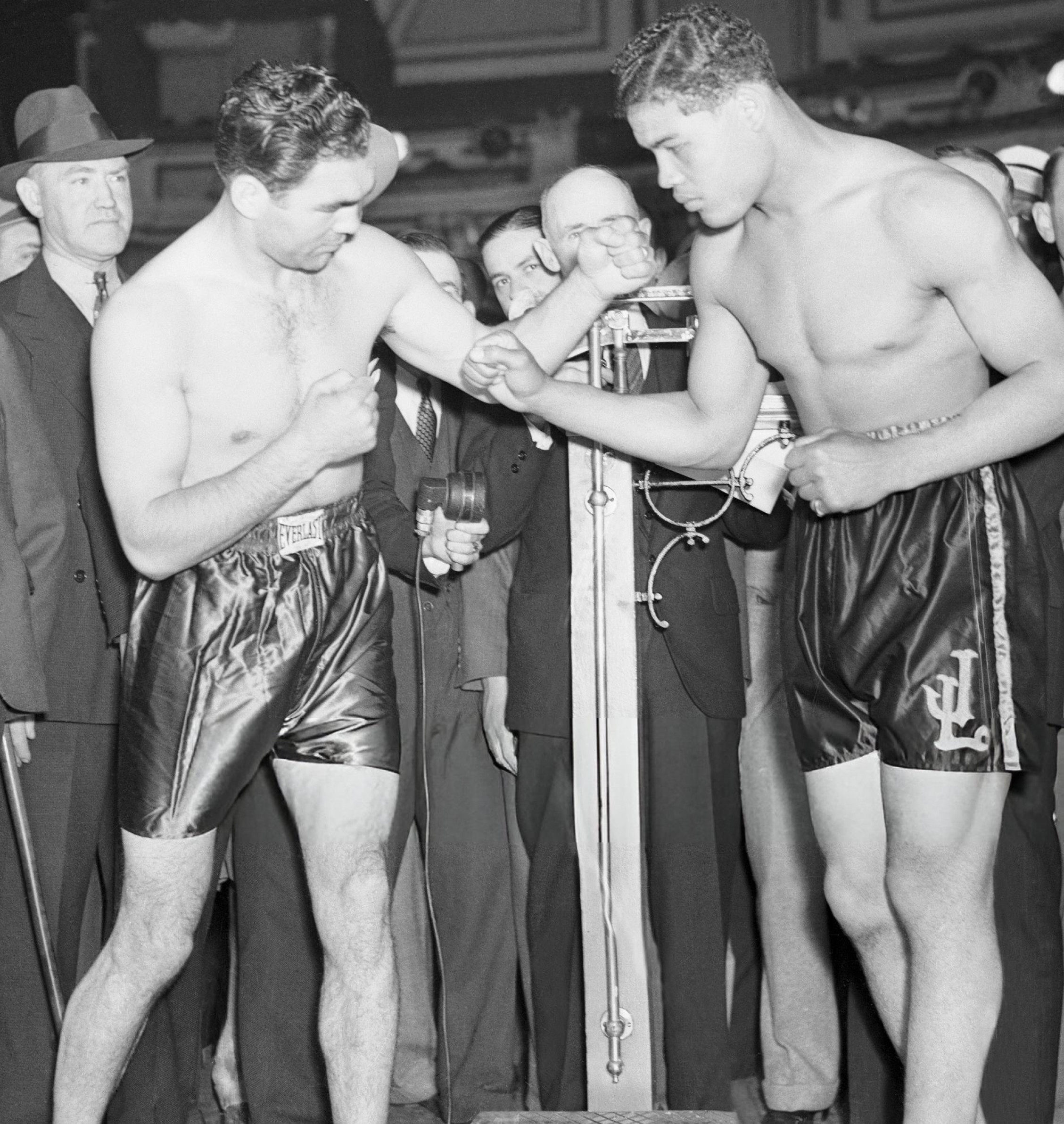
The weigh-in for Louis vs. Schmeling, 1938

After his victory over Louis, Schmeling negotiated for a title bout with world heavyweight champion James J. Braddock. But the talks fell through – partially because of the more lucrative potential of a Louis-Braddock matchup, and partially because of the possibility that, in the event of a Schmeling victory, Nazi authorities would not allow subsequent title challenges by American opponents. Instead, Louis fought Braddock on June 22, 1937, knocking him out in eight rounds in Chicago. Louis, however, publicly announced after the fight that he refused to recognize himself as world champion until he fought Schmeling again.

The United States economy had long been suffering from the Great Depression when these two combatants had their two fights. The economic problem affected the United States throughout the 1930s, and many Americans sought inspiration in the world of sports.

Compounding the economic instability was a heated political conflict between Nazi Germany and the United States. By the time of the Louis–Schmeling rematch in 1938, Nazi Germany had taken over Austria in the Anschluss, heightening tensions between Germany and the other Western powers, and generating much anti-German propaganda in the American media. The German regime generated an onslaught of racially charged propaganda of its own; much of it created by propaganda minister Joseph Goebbels based on Schmeling's success in the boxing world.

Schmeling did not relish being the focus of such propaganda. He was not a member of the Nazi Party and – although proud of his German nationality – denied the Nazi claims of racial superiority: "I am a fighter, not a politician. I am no superman in any way." Schmeling kept his Jewish manager, Joe Jacobs, despite significant pressure, and, in a dangerous political gamble, refused the "Dagger of Honor" award offered by Adolf Hitler. In fact, Schmeling had been urged by his friend and legendary ex-champion Jack Dempsey to defect and declare American citizenship. Schmeling never did revoke his German citizenship, however. Schmeling was quoted saying, "Once a German, always a German."

Nevertheless, the Nazi regime exploited Schmeling in its propaganda efforts and took careful steps to at least ensure Schmeling's nominal compliance. Schmeling's wife and mother were kept from traveling with him to avert any attempt he might make to defect.

Schmeling's entourage also included an official Nazi Party publicist. The publicist not only controlled any possible contrarian remarks by Schmeling, but also issued statements that a black man could not defeat Schmeling, and that Schmeling's purse from the fight would be used to build more German tanks. Hitler himself lifted the nationwide 3:00 a.m. curfew so that cafés and bars could carry the broadcast for their patrons. As a result, the perception of the American public had turned decidedly against Schmeling between 1936 and 1938. Schmeling was picketed at his hotel room, received a tremendous amount of hate mail, and was assaulted with cigarette butts and other detritus as he approached the ring.

A few weeks before the rematch, Louis visited President Franklin Delano Roosevelt at the White House. The New York Times quoted Roosevelt as telling the fighter, "Joe, we need muscles like yours to beat Germany." In his 1976 biography, Louis wrote, "I knew I had to get Schmeling good. I had my own personal reasons and the whole damned country was depending on me." This time, Louis took training for the bout seriously, giving up golf and women throughout his training. Joe Louis said to a friend before the fight, "Yeah, I'm scared. I'm scared I might kill Schmeling."

A few days before the fight, the New York State Athletic Commission had ruled that Joe Jacobs, Schmeling's manager, was ineligible to work in the German's corner, or be in the locker room, as punishment for a previous public relations infraction involving fighter "Two-Ton" Tony Galento. In addition, Schmeling's normal cornerman, Doc Casey, declined to work with Schmeling, fearing bad publicity. As a result, Schmeling sat anxiously in the locker room before the bout; in contrast, Louis took a two-hour nap.

== The fight ==
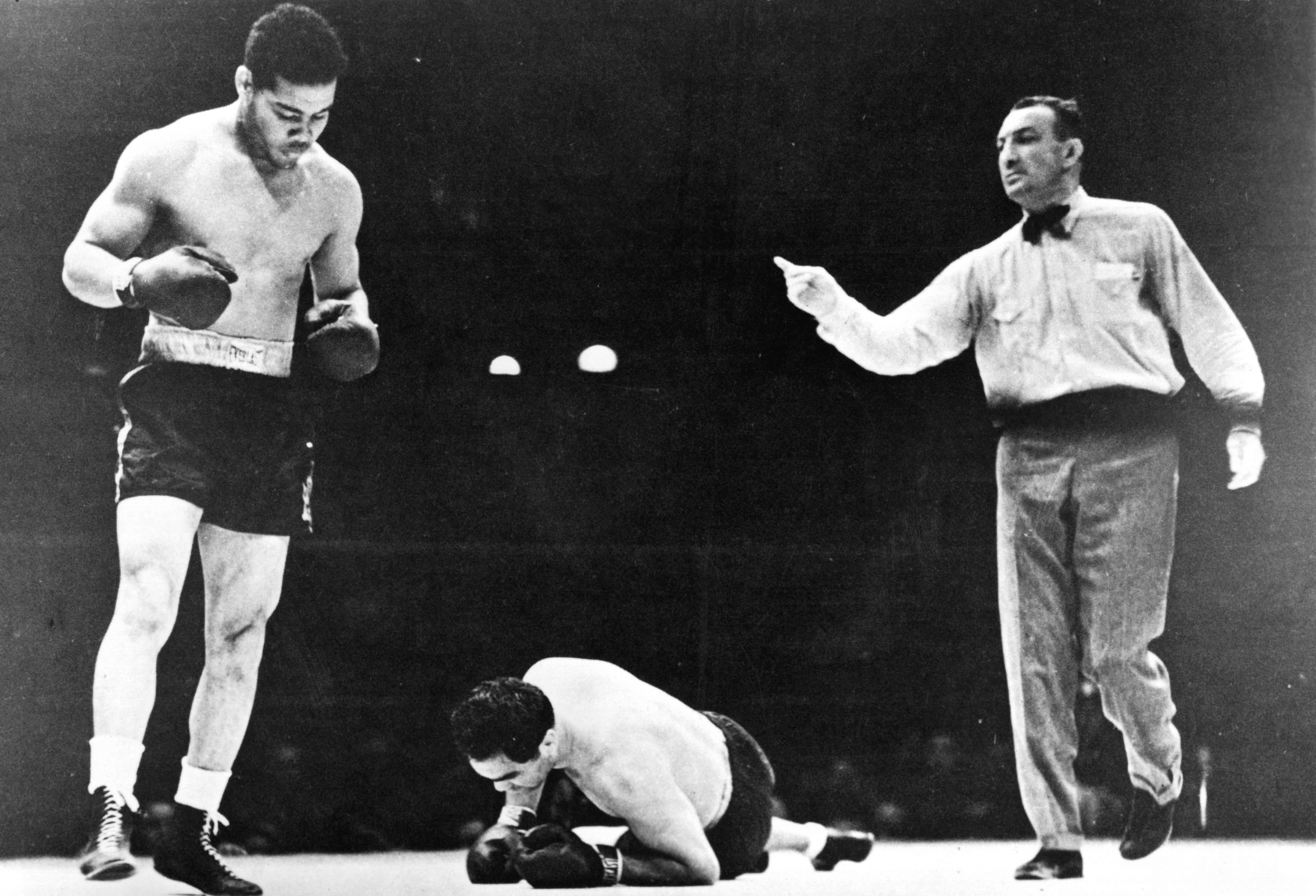
Louis vs. Schmeling, 1938

The Louis-Schmeling rematch came on June 22, 1938 – one year from the day Louis had won the world Heavyweight title. The fighters met once again in a sold-out Yankee Stadium in New York City. Among the more than 70,000 fans in attendance were Clark Gable, Douglas Fairbanks, Gary Cooper, Gregory Peck, and J. Edgar Hoover. The fight drew gate receipts of $1,015,012 (equivalent to $23.2 million in 2025). 70 million listened on radio in the U.S., and over 100 million around the world.

Schmeling came out of his corner trying to utilize the same style that got him the victory in their first fight, with a straight-standing posture and his left hand prepared to begin jabbing.

Louis' strategy, however, had been to get the fight over early. Before the fight, he mentioned to his trainer Jack "Chappie" Blackburn that he would devote all his energy to the first three rounds, and even told sportswriter Jimmy Cannon that he predicted a knockout in one. After only a few seconds of feinting, Louis unleashed a tireless barrage on Schmeling. Referee Arthur Donovan Sr. stopped the action for the first time just over one minute and a half into the fight after Louis connected on five left hooks and a body blow to Schmeling's lower left which had him audibly crying in pain. After sending Louis briefly to his corner, Donovan quickly resumed action, after which Louis went on the attack again, immediately felling the German with a right hook to the face. Schmeling went down this time, arising on the count of three.

Louis then resumed his barrage, this time focusing on Schmeling's head. After connecting on three clean shots to Schmeling's jaw, the German fell to the canvas again, arising at the count of two. With Schmeling having few defenses left at this point, Louis connected at will, sending Schmeling to the canvas for the third time in short order, this time near the ring's center. Schmeling's cornerman Max Machon threw a towel in the ring – although, under New York state rules, this did not end the fight. Machon was therefore forced to enter the ring at the count of eight, at which point Donovan had already declared the fight over. Louis was the winner and world Heavyweight champion, by a technical knockout, two minutes and four seconds into the first round. In all, Louis had thrown 41 punches in the fight, 31 of which landed solidly. Schmeling, by contrast, had been able to throw only two punches.

== Aftermath ==
Having been soundly defeated, Schmeling had to be admitted to Polyclinic Hospital for ten days. During his stay, it was discovered that Louis had cracked several vertebrae in Schmeling's back.

Schmeling and his handlers complained after the bout that Louis' initial volley had included an illegal kidney punch, and even refused Louis' visitation at the hospital. The claim resounded hollowly in the media, however, and they eventually chose not to file a formal complaint.

== Legacy ==
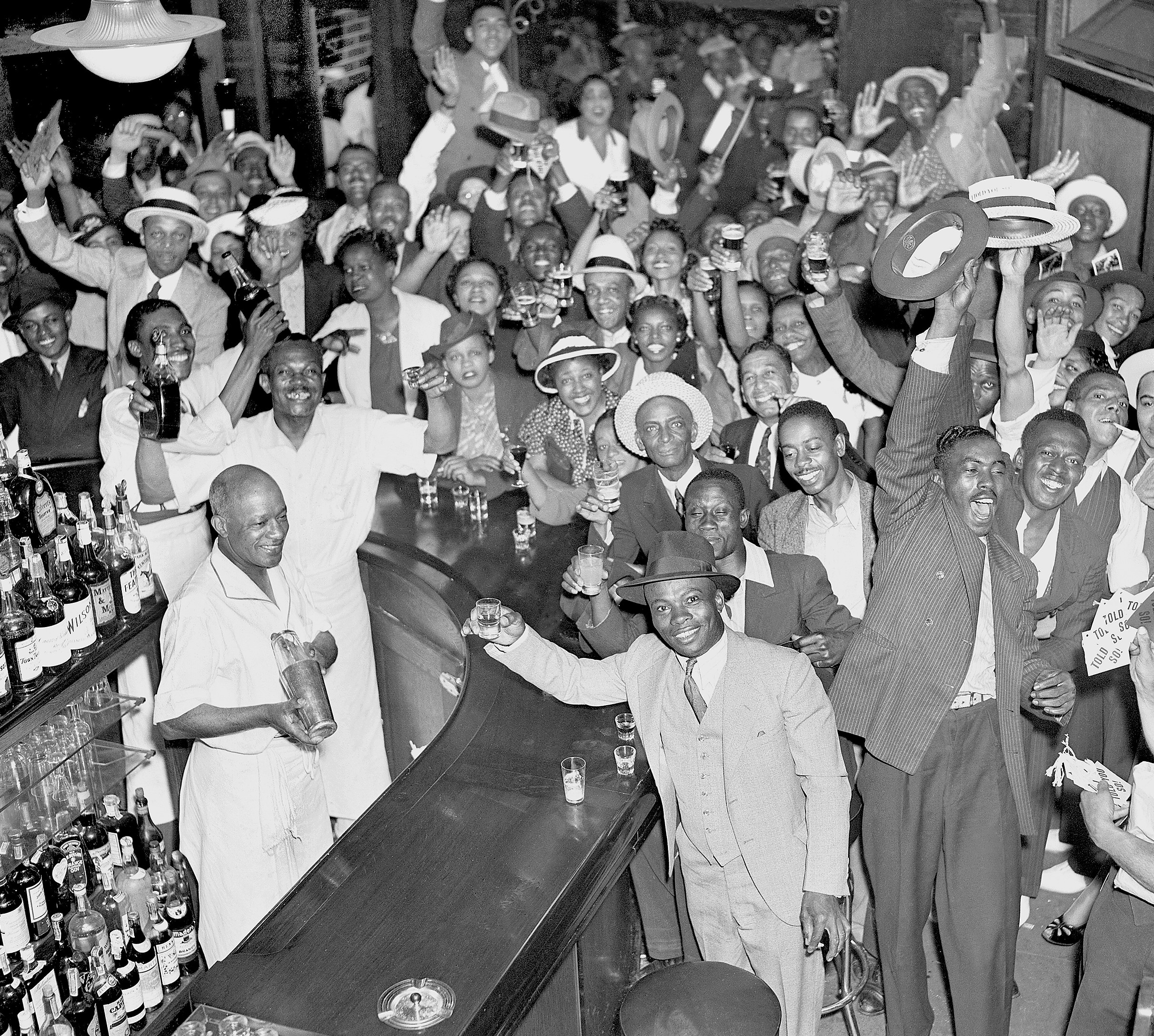
Celebrations in Harlem after the match

The fight had racial as well as political undertones. Much of black America pinned its hopes on the outcome of this Joe Louis fight and his other matches, seeing Louis' success as a vehicle for advancing the cause of African Americans everywhere. The fight between Louis and Schmeling is oftentimes seen as Louis's career defining event and emphasizes his historical importance. With the fight taking place amidst the time the Nazi regime had annexed Austria, Louis was seen as a symbol of democracy where Schmeling was seen as a symbol of fascism. This fight rewarded Louis with widespread support, as ironically an African American man became a symbol of America as a whole. His victory over Schmeling solidified his role as an American sports hero and a representative of their values, which also marked a revolution of differing attitudes towards race. This was a significant development considering the way people of color were treated in sports at this time. In his autobiography, Schmeling himself confirmed the public's reaction to the outcome, recounting his ambulance ride to the hospital afterward: "As we drove through Harlem, there were noisy, dancing crowds. Bands had left the nightclubs and bars and were playing and dancing on the sidewalks and streets. The whole area was filled with celebration, noise, and saxophones, continuously punctuated by the calling of Joe Louis' name."

Reaction in the mainstream American press, while positive toward Louis, reflected the implicit racism in the United States at the time. Lewis F. Atchison of The Washington Post began his story: "Joe Louis, the lethargic, chicken-eating young colored boy, reverted to his dreaded role of the 'brown bomber' tonight"; Henry McLemore of the United Press called Louis "a jungle man, completely primitive as any savage, out to destroy the thing he hates."

The day after the fight, blues musician Bill Gaither recorded one of his most famous songs, "Champ Joe Louis," a song praising the champ in his defeat of Max Schmeling.

Although Schmeling rebounded professionally from the loss to Louis (winning the European Heavyweight Title in 1939 by knocking out Adolf Heuser in the 1st round), the Nazi regime would cease promoting him as a national hero. Schmeling and Nazi authorities grew further in opposition over time. During the Kristallnacht of November 1938, Schmeling provided sanctuary for two young Jewish boys to safeguard them from the Gestapo. Conversely, as a way of punishing Schmeling for his increasingly public resistance, Hitler drafted Schmeling into paratrooper duty in the German Luftwaffe. After brief military service and a comeback attempt in 1947–48, Schmeling retired from professional boxing. He would go on to invest his earnings in various post-War businesses. His resistance to the Nazi party elevated his status once again to that of a hero in post-war Germany.

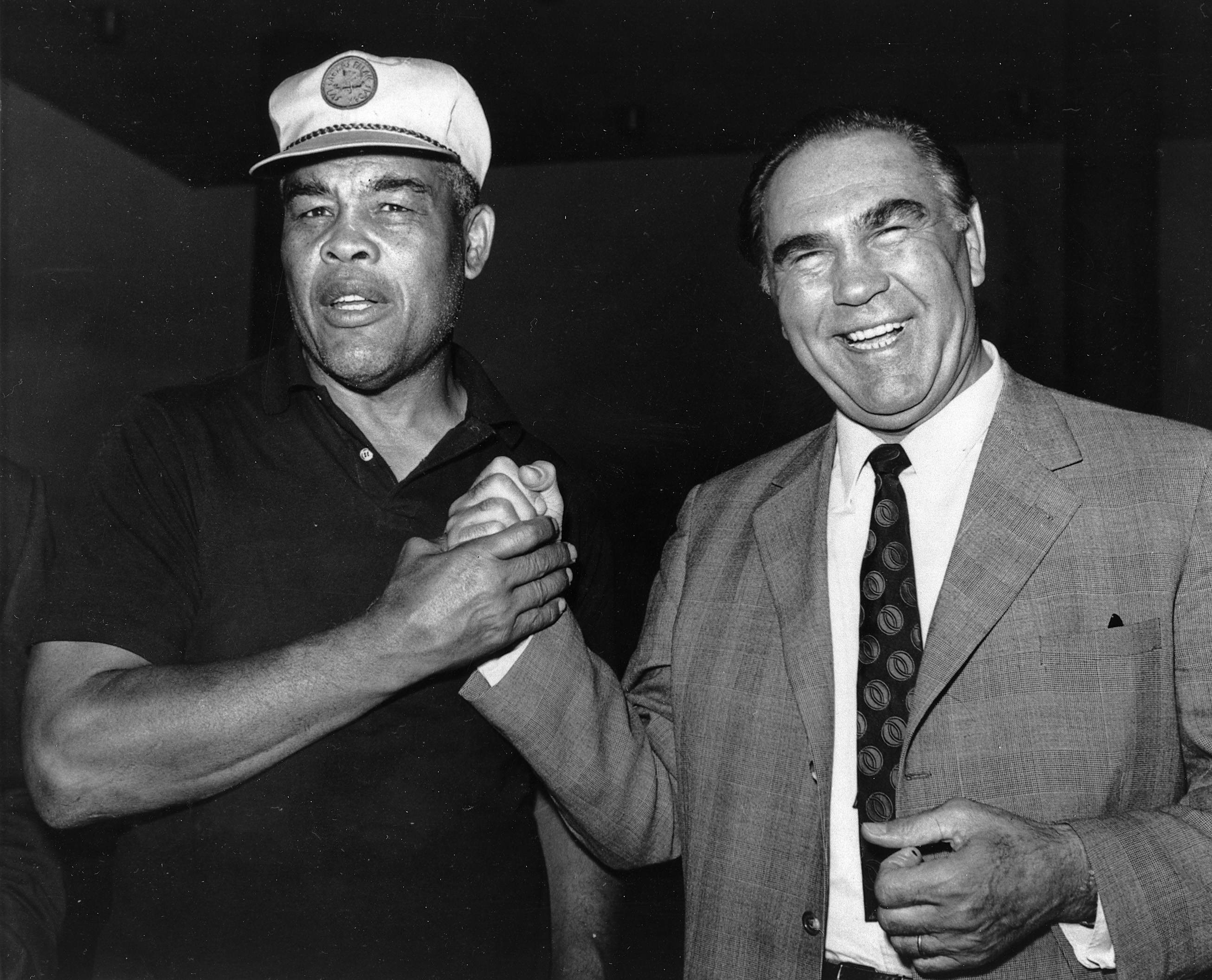
Louis and Schmeling, 1971. The former rivals became close friends in later life

Louis went on to become a major celebrity in the United States and is considered the first true African American national hero. When other prominent blacks questioned whether African Americans should serve against the Axis nations in the segregated U.S. Armed Forces, Louis disagreed, saying, "There are a lot of things wrong with America, but Hitler ain't gonna fix them." He would go on and serve the United States Army during World War II, but he did not engage in battle while the war was going on. He mostly visited soldiers in Europe to provide them with motivational speeches and with boxing exhibitions. He kept defending the world heavyweight title until 1949, making twenty-five consecutive title defenses – still, a world record among all weight divisions for men's boxing (Regina Halmich, a woman boxer, made 29 defenses of her Women's International Boxing Federation world Flyweight championship).

Louis' finances evaporated later in life, and he became involved in the use of illicit drugs.

Louis and Schmeling developed a friendship outside the ring, which endured until Louis' death on April 12, 1981. Their rivalry and friendship was the focus of the 1978 TV movie Ring of Passion. Louis got a job as a greeter at the Caesars Palace hotel in Las Vegas, and Schmeling flew to visit him every year. Louis was reportedly so in need of money, but too damaged to box anymore, so the former champion took up professional wrestling to make ends meet. Schmeling reportedly also sent Louis money in Louis' later years and covered a part of the costs of Louis' funeral, at which he was a pallbearer. Schmeling died 24 years later on February 2, 2005, at the age of 99. He was ranked 55 on The Ring's list of 100 greatest punchers of all time in 2003.

Both Louis and Schmeling are members of the International Boxing Hall of Fame.

== Undercard ==
Confirmed bouts:

Preceded by vs. Harry Thomas	Joe Louis's bouts 22 June 1938	Succeeded by vs. John Henry Lewis
Preceded by vs. Steve Dudas	Max Schmeling's bouts 22 June 1938	Succeeded by vs. Adolf Heuser
