= Jimmy Lyggett Sr =

American boxer

Jimmy Lyggett
Personal information
- Nationality: (United States) American
- Born: 1897. Philadelphia, Pennsylvania, USA
- Died: 1955.(?) in USA
- Weight: Heavyweight

Boxing career

Jimmy Lyggett (1897, Philadelphia, Pennsylvania – c. 1955, somewhere in US) was an American boxer and boxing trainer.

== Boxer ==
He started boxing at the age of 17. At the age of 20, he won the United States Championship for professional Black boxers. One year later, he boxed with Eddie Palmer and won the match by KO in 19 rounds, taking the title of the champion of the "Colored Championship of the World'.

Lyggett fought with several great boxers during his career. He boxed against Jack Blackburn on November 25, 1918 in Philadelphia (ND, 6 rounds) and in 1919 with George Robinson, who later two times fought for 'Colored' World middleweight title.

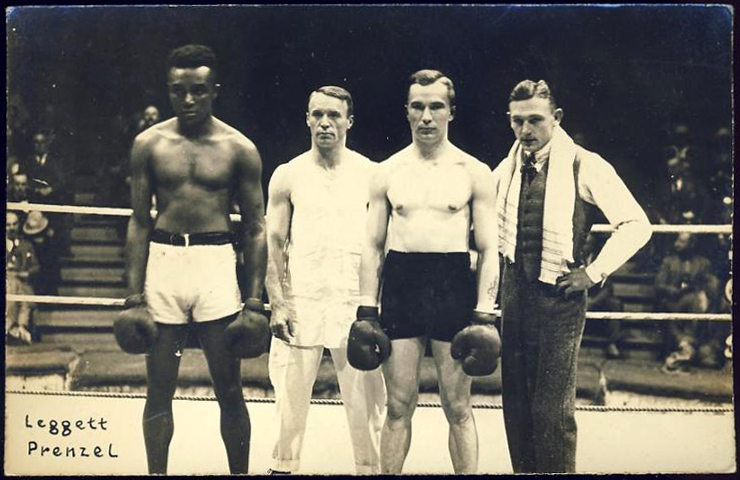
Jimmy Lyggett (wrong written: Leggett) and Kurt Prenzel in Europe

After winning the World Colored Heavyweight Championship, he moved Europe in order to prove himself as the best boxer in the world. He fought several top European boxers, including state champions and vice champions of Germany: Rudolf Arndt, Hans Breitenstraeter, Walter Buckszun, Kurt Prenzel, Adolf Seybold, Rudi Wagener, and Adolf Wiegert, as well as Dane Chic Nelson, and Italian Giuseppe Spalla. He boxed against Max Schmeling twice: the first time on December 26, 1924 in Cologne, losing by TKO in 4th round (disqualification), and second time, in a rematch in Berlin, on April 3, 1925. The two men drew in 8 rounds. After these fights, he was Schmeling's sparring partner for a period of time.

== Boxing trainer ==
While he lived in Vienna, Austria, he met a woman of Croat descent, Roza, whom he married. The couple moved to Zagreb, Croatia in the 1930s. There, he opened his boxing school in Ilica street.

At the age of 33, he ended his career as boxer. He trained many young boxers in several boxing clubs in Zagreb, starting with boxing club Croatia, and later with clubs Herkules, Makabi and Radnik.

After a while, he became a friend with a neighboring tavern owner. He gave him his warehouse in Preradovićeva as a training hall.

When the Independent State of Croatia was formed, its Minister of Sports, Miško Zebić talked Lyggett into training the Croatian national boxing team.

Lyggett was an anti-Communist. Before the end of the war, his brother invited him to return to the US. Finally he accepted the invitation and convinced his wife to move to the US. In 1945, they set off for the US via Italy. They waited for months the ship that would take them to United States. His wife got ill and died in Milan. Broken, Lyggett returned to America alone.

His death place and death date are unclear. Some sources say that he died in US in 1955.

== Sources and references ==
- (in Croatian) Jutarnji list Marin Penavić: Jimmy Lyggett, crnac na čelu boksačke reprezentacije NDH, Feb 2, 2010, accessed Sep 2, 2010 (pictures of Lyggett)
