= Paulino Uzcudun =

Spanish boxer (1899–1985)

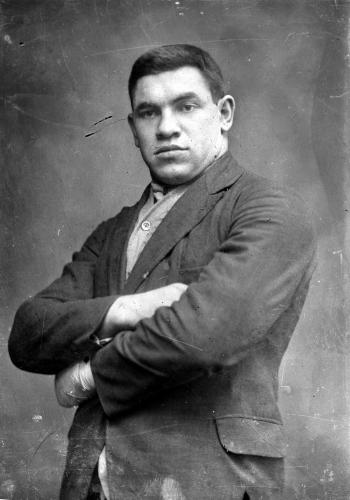

Personal information
- Nickname: Basque Woodchopper
- Nationality: Spanish
- Born: 3 May 1899 Errezil, Guipuzcoa; Basque Country; Spain
- Died: 5 July 1985 (aged 86) Madrid
- Height: 1.78 m (5 ft 10 in)
- Weight: Heavyweight

Boxing career
- Stance: Orthodox

Boxing record
- Total fights: 69
- Wins: 49
- Win by KO: 33
- Losses: 17
- Draws: 3

Paulino Uzcudun Eizmendi (3 May 1899 – 5 July 1985) was a Basque Spanish heavyweight boxer, who is considered to be the greatest heavyweight from Spain. Uzkudun is the Basque spelling of his last name. He was the youngest of nine siblings. In his youth, he became an aizkolari or traditional competitive Basque wood chopper. Uzcudun, known as Paulino in the United States, was the European heavyweight champion, and he fought heavyweight champions Joe Louis, Max Baer, Max Schmeling (three times) and Primo Carnera (twice) during his career. The former butcher—nicknamed "the Basque woodchopper"—retired from boxing with a record of 49 wins (33 KOs), 17 losses and 3 draws.

== Life & career ==
Uzcudun was a rugged boxer with a crouched stance and cross-armed guard. He had a powerful left hook, and fought the toughest heavyweights of his time. He had only one opportunity at the world's heavyweight championship, but was defeated in a fifteen-round fight by Primo Carnera of Italy on October 22, 1933. Trainer Whitey Bimstein accompanied Uzcudun to the bout in Barcelona, Spain. Later in life, Bimstein gave an account in interview, of a scene more reminiscent of the cinema: "I remember one day we were at a sidewalk cafe. Just as I started to put my lips to a glass of vermouth a shot splintered the glass. Believe me, I got back to the hotel in nothing flat..." Much more grim was his description of the Civil War in Spain beyond such high drama: "It was nothing to walk along the streets covered with hundreds of dead, and you couldn't tell when the fighting would break out anew." Against this chaotic backdrop, Uzcudun's chance at the title took place.

Shortly before the fight, Carnera balked at the Spanish-made gloves chosen by the governing boxing commission. The champion, who had insisted upon American gloves, stated loudly and in Spanish that he would not fight. The commissioner, according to Bimstein, removed himself from the room, and "about a dozen soldiers walked toward Carnera." The champion "backed up hurriedly" and conceded the choice. As for the actual fight, Uzcudun went the 15 scheduled rounds and well enough, that "when the verdict was announced, the revolution started all over again." A riot, which included gunfire, commenced. Uzcudun, Bimstein, the other seconds and as many as "three hundred others" took refuge under the massive ring, until troops restored order—even with this, citizenry "continued rioting in the streets all night...." It was unfortunate for Uzcudun, whom Bimstein said "was the finest character among the fighters I ever met, square as they make 'em, game and tough, and in his prime a match for any of 'em."

Uzcudun also "retired" the famed Harry Wills, when he stopped him in four rounds on July 13, 1927. The tough and durable Uzcudun was never knocked off his feet, or KO'd until his last professional fight. On December 13, 1935, Uzcudun made the mistake of coming out of retirement to meet Joe Louis. In the fourth round, Louis hit Uzcudun with a swift, powerful right uppercut that knocked him down causing the referee to stop the fight even though Uzcudun wanted to continue. His record was 49–17–3 with 33 knockouts.

In 1933–34, Uzcudun trained on the beach in Rocky Point, Long Island, New York. During a sparring session with Franklin Rosalia (1911–1972), who also summered in Rocky Point, Uzcudun received a punch that knocked him down flat. Some conjecture that this incident led to his subsequent retirement having been demoralized by this incident. In 1936, Uzcudun fought on the Nationalist (pro-Franco) side during the Spanish Civil War reportedly from the first day of the conflict as a member of the Falange Española de las JONS.

== Professional boxing record ==
All information in this section is derived from BoxRec, unless otherwise stated.

69 fights	49 wins	17 losses
By knockout	33	1
By decision	16	14
By disqualification	0	2
Draws	3	

No.	Result	Record	Opponent	Type	Round	Date	Location	Notes
69	Loss	49–17–3	Joe Louis	TKO	4 (15), 2:32	Dec 13, 1935	Madison Square Garden, Manhattan, New York, U.S.	
68	Loss	49–16–3	Max Schmeling	PTS	12	Jul 7, 1935	Poststadion, Moabit, Germany	
67	Draw	49–15–3	Max Schmeling	MD	12	May 13, 1934	Estadio Olímpico de Montjuïc, Barcelona, Spain	On December 3, 1934, Uzcudun was stripped of the Spanish Heavyweight Championship for refusing to defend it against Isidoro Gastañaga.
66	Loss	49–15–2	Primo Carnera	UD	15	Oct 22, 1933	Piazza di Siena, Rome, Italy	The EBU European and IBU World Heavyweight Championships were at stake.
65	Win	49–14–2	Don McCorkindale	PTS	10	Jul 1, 1933	La Monumental, Barcelona, Spain	
64	Win	48–14–2	Pierre Charles	SD	15	May 13, 1933	Las Ventas, Madrid, Spain	The EBU European Heavyweight Championship was at stake.
63	Win	47–14–2	Hans Schönrath	PTS	10	Apr 16, 1933	Frontón Betis, Seville, Spain	
62	Win	46–14–2	Ernst Guehring	KO	2 (10)	Mar 18, 1933	Plaza de Toros de Valencia, Valencia, Spain	
61	Win	45–14–2	Salvatore Ruggirello	PTS	10	Feb 3, 1933	Frontón Jai-Alai, Madrid, Spain	
60	Win	44–14–2	Giacomo Bergomas	KO	1 (10)	Jan 24, 1933	Teatro Circo Olympia, Barcelona, Spain	
59	Loss	43–14–2	Ernie Schaaf	PTS	15	Jul 25, 1932	Madison Square Garden Bowl, Queens, New York, U.S.	
58	Loss	43–13–2	Mickey Walker	UD	10	May 26, 1932	Madison Square Garden, Manhattan, New York, U.S.	
57	Win	43–12–2	Jack Gagnon	KO	7 (10)	Apr 4, 1932	St. Nicholas Arena, New York City, New York, U.S.	
56	Loss	42–12–2	King Levinsky	MD	10	Jan 15, 1932	Chicago Stadium, Chicago, Illinois, U.S.	
55	Loss	42–11–2	Tommy Loughran	SD	10	Nov 13, 1931	Madison Square Garden, Manhattan, New York, U.S.	
54	Win	42–10–2	Max Baer	PTS	20	Jul 4, 1931	Race Track Arena, Reno, Nevada, U.S.	
53	Win	41–10–2	Les Kennedy	TKO	4 (10), 2:10	Mar 10, 1931	Olympic Auditorium, Los Angeles, California, U.S.	
52	Loss	40–10–2	Primo Carnera	SD	10	Nov 30, 1930	Estadio Olímpico de Montjuïc, Barcelona, Spain	
51	Win	40–9–2	Maurice Griselle	TKO	5 (10)	Oct 18, 1930	Vélodrome d'Hiver, Paris, France	
50	Loss	39–9–2	Johnny Risko	PTS	10	Jun 19, 1930	Navin Field, Detroit, Michigan, U.S.	
49	Win	39–8–2	Otto von Porat	PTS	10	Jan 10, 1930	Madison Square Garden, Manhattan, New York, U.S.	
48	Loss	38–8–2	Tully Griffiths	MD	10	Nov 29, 1929	Chicago Stadium, Chicago, Illinois, U.S.	
47	Loss	38–7–2	Max Schmeling	PTS	15	Jun 27, 1929	Yankee Stadium, The Bronx, New York, U.S.	
46	Win	38–6–2	Francisco Cruz Coelho	KO	1 (10), 1:29	Mar 24, 1929	San Juan Stadium, San Juan, Puerto Rico	
45	Win	37–6–2	KO Christner	PTS	10	Feb 22, 1929	Madison Square Garden, Manhattan, New York, U.S.	A month before this fight, Uzcudun was stripped of the EBU European Heavyweight Championship for failing to defend it.
44	Win	36–6–2	Jack Renault	UD	10	Dec 25, 1928	Estadio Versailles, Cali, Colombia	The Colombian Heavyweight Championship was at stake.
43	Win	35–6–2	Bill Hartwell	PTS	10	Dec 3, 1928	Philadelphia, Pennsylvania, U.S.	
42	Win	34–6–2	Otto von Porat	PTS	10	Nov 11, 1928	Madison Square Garden, Manhattan, New York, U.S.	
41	Loss	33–6–2	Big Boy Peterson	DQ	2 (10)	Oct 19, 1928	Ebbets Field, Brooklyn, New York, U.S.	Uzcudun was DQ'd for hitting Peterson while he was unconscious. Peterson was a late replacement for the injured Roberto Roberti.
40	Win	33–5–2	Ludwig Haymann	KO	11 (12)	Jul 7, 1928	Plaza de Toros del Chofre, San Sebastián, Spain	The EBU European Heavyweight Championship was at stake.
39	Loss	32–5–2	George Godfrey	PTS	10	Feb 28, 1928	Wrigley Field, Los Angeles, California, U.S.	
38	Win	32–4–2	Quintin Romero Rojas	KO	3 (15)	Jan 29, 1928	Toreo de Cuatro Caminos, Mexico City, Mexico	
37	Win	31–4–2	Ed Keeley	TKO	2 (10), 2:50	Jan 16, 1928	Broadway Arena, Brooklyn, New York, U.S.	
36	Win	30–4–2	Pat Lester	TKO	7 (10)	Jan 2, 1928	Armory, Newark, New Jersey, U.S.	
35	Loss	29–4–2	Johnny Risko	PTS	10	Nov 25, 1927	Madison Square Garden, Manhattan, New York, U.S.	
34	Draw	29–3–2	Tom Heeney	PTS	15	Sep 8, 1927	Madison Square Garden, Manhattan, New York, U.S.	
33	Loss	29–3–1	Jack Delaney	DQ	7 (10), 1:57	Aug 11, 1927	Yankee Stadium, The Bronx, New York, U.S.	
32	Win	29–2–1	Harry Wills	KO	4 (15), 1:27	Jul 13, 1927	Ebbets Field, Brooklyn, New York, U.S.	
31	Win	28–2–1	Tom Heeney	PTS	10	Apr 1, 1927	Madison Square Garden, Manhattan, New York, U.S.	
30	Win	27–2–1	Knute Hansen	PTS	10	Feb 25, 1927	Madison Square Garden, Manhattan, New York, U.S.	
29	Win	26–2–1	Homer Smith	TKO	7 (10)	Jan 21, 1927	Benjamin Field Arena, Tampa, Florida, U.S.	
28	Win	25–2–1	Antolín Fierro	KO	1 (10)	Jan 15, 1927	Nuevo Frontón, Havana, Cuba	
27	Win	24–2–1	Martin O'Grady	KO	1 (12)	Jan 1, 1927	Almendares Park, Havana, Cuba	
26	Win	23–2–1	Erminio Spalla	PTS	12	May 18, 1926	La Monumental, Barcelona, Spain	The EBU European Heavyweight Championship was at stake.
25	Win	22–2–1	Harry Drake	KO	1 (10), 1:25	Mar 23, 1926	Cirque de Paris, Paris, France	
24	Draw	21–2–1	Franz Diener	PTS	10	Feb 12, 1926	Kaiserdamm Arena, Berlin, Germany	
23	Win	21–2	Soldier Jones	KO	1 (12)	Feb 9, 1926	Cirque de Paris, Paris, France	
22	Win	20–2	Constant Barrick	TKO	4 (10)	Jan 29, 1926	Circo Olympia, Barcelona, Spain	
21	Win	19–2	Hans Breitenstraeter	KO	9 (10)	Dec 1, 1925	Berlin Sportpalast, Berlin, Germany	
20	Win	18–2	Marcel Nilles	KO	3 (10)	Nov 7, 1925	Vélodrome d'Hiver, Paris, France	
19	Win	17–2	Constant Barrick	TKO	6 (12)	Oct 16, 1925	Circo Price, Madrid, Spain	
18	Win	16–2	Fernand Delarge	TKO	1 (10)	Oct 10, 1925	Plaza de toros de las Arenas, Barcelona, Spain	
17	Win	15–2	Phil Scott	KO	6 (12)	Sep 6, 1925	Plaza de Toros de Vista Alegre, Bilbao, Spain	Scott let himself be counted out, claiming he had been hit low.
16	Win	14–2	Jack Humbeeck	PTS	12	Jul 11, 1925	Plaza de Toros de Goya, Madrid, Spain	
15	Win	13–2	Fernand Delarge	PTS	12	Jun 7, 1925	Arènes d'Eckmühl, Oran, France (present-day Algeria)	
14	Win	12–2	Jack Humbeeck	TKO	4 (10)	Dec 20, 1924	Vélodrome d'Hiver, Paris, France	
13	Win	11–2	Louis Piochelle	KO	2 (10)	Oct 5, 1924	Stade Municipal, Algiers, France (present-day Algeria)	
12	Win	10–2	Frank Goddard	TKO	6 (10)	Sep 7, 1924	Arènes de Bayonne, Bayonne, France	
11	Loss	9–2	George Cook	PTS	15	Jul 29, 1924	Cirque de Paris, Paris, France	
10	Loss	9–1	George Cook	PTS	10	Jul 3, 1924	Royal Albert Hall, London, England	
9	Win	9–0	Jose Teixidor	KO	3 (10)	Jun 14, 1924	Cirque d'hiver, Paris, France	
8	Win	8–0	Arthur Townley	KO	1 (10)	Jun 1, 1924	Stade Buffalo, Montrouge, France	
7	Win	7–0	Marcel Nilles	KO	5 (12)	May 17, 1924	Plaza de toros de las Arenas, Barcelona, Spain	
6	Win	6–0	Paul Journee	KO	1 (10), 1:30	May 11, 1924	Estadio Municipal de Atocha, San Sebastián, Spain	
5	Win	5–0	Laurent Mahieu	KO	1 (10)	Apr 19, 1924	Frontón Euskalduna, Bilbao, Spain	
4	Win	4–0	Alex Touroff	KO	2 (10)	Apr 4, 1924	Circo Americano, Madrid, Spain	
3	Win	3–0	Herman Sjouwerman	TKO	5 (10)	Jan 2, 1924	Salle Wagram, Paris, France	
2	Win	2–0	Paul Journee	PTS	10	Sep 26, 1923	Salle Wagram, Paris, France	
1	Win	1–0	Alex Touroff	KO	3 (10)	Sep 16, 1923	Stade Anastasie, Paris, France	Professional debut
