= Max Schmeling =

German boxer (1905–2005)

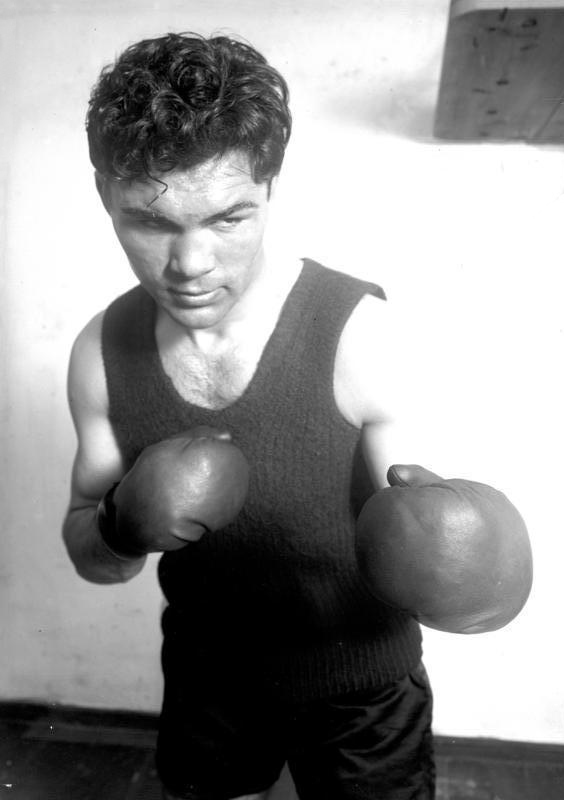
- Schmeling in March 1930

Personal information
- Nicknames: Black Uhlan of the Rhine; Der schwarze Ulan vom Rhein
- Born: Maximilian Adolph Otto Siegfried Schmeling; 28 September 1905 Klein Luckow, Province of Brandenburg, Prussia, German Empire
- Died: 2 February 2005 (aged 99) Wenzendorf, Lower Saxony, Germany
- Height: 1.85 m (6 ft 1 in)
- Weight: Light-heavyweight; Heavyweight
- Military career
- Allegiance: Nazi Germany
- Branch: Luftwaffe
- Service years: 1939–1941
- Conflicts: World War II: Mediterranean theatre; Battle of Crete (WIA)

Boxing career
- Reach: 1.93 m (76 in)
- Stance: Orthodox

Boxing record
- Total fights: 70
- Wins: 56
- Win by KO: 40
- Losses: 10
- Draws: 4
Medal record
Men's amateur boxing
Representing Germany
German National Championships
Silver medal – second place	1924 Chemnitz	Light-heavyweight

Maximilian Adolph Otto Siegfried Schmeling (German: [ˈmaks ˈʃmeːlɪŋ]; 28 September 1905 – 2 February 2005) was a German boxer who was heavyweight champion of the world between 1930 and 1932. His two fights with Joe Louis in 1936 and 1938 were worldwide cultural events because of their national associations. Schmeling is the only boxer to win the world heavyweight championship on a foul.

Starting his professional career in 1924, Schmeling went to the United States in 1928 and, after a ninth-round technical knockout of Johnny Risko, became a sensation. He became the first to win the heavyweight championship (at that time vacant) by disqualification in 1930, after opponent Jack Sharkey knocked him down with a low blow in the fourth round. Schmeling retained his crown successfully in 1931 by a technical knockout victory over Young Stribling. A rematch in 1932 with Sharkey saw the American gaining the title from Schmeling by a controversial fifteen-round split decision. In 1933, Schmeling lost to Max Baer by a tenth-round technical knockout. The loss left people believing that Schmeling was past his prime. Meanwhile, Adolf Hitler and the Nazi Party took over control in Germany, but Schmeling never joined the Party. The same year, he married Czech film actress Anny Ondra.

In 1936, in their first fight, Schmeling knocked out American rising star Joe Louis, placing him as the number one contender for Jim Braddock's title, but Louis got the fight and knocked Braddock out to win the championship in 1937. Schmeling finally got a chance to regain his title in 1938 in the rematch, but Louis won by TKO in the first round. During World War II, Schmeling served with the German Air Force (Luftwaffe) as a paratrooper (Fallschirmjäger). After the war, Schmeling mounted a comeback, but retired permanently in 1948. After retiring from boxing, Schmeling worked for The Coca-Cola Company. Schmeling became friends with Louis, and their friendship lasted until the latter's death in 1981. Schmeling died in 2005 aged 99, a sporting hero in his native Germany. Long after the Second World War, it was revealed that Schmeling had risked his life to save the lives of two Jewish children in 1938. At the age of 99, Schmeling was the longest living heavyweight boxing champion in history.

In 2003, Schmeling was ranked 55 on The Ring magazine's list of 100 greatest punchers of all time.

== Biography ==
=== Early years ===
Max Schmeling Jr. was born in Klein Luckow, in the Prussian Province of Brandenburg, the son of Max Sr. and Amanda (née Fuchs) Schmeling. He had an older brother, Rudolf, born in 1902 and a younger sister, Edith, born in 1913. He first became acquainted with boxing as a teenager, when his father took him to watch film of the heavyweight championship match between Jack Dempsey and Georges Carpentier. Impressed with Dempsey's performance in that fight, young Schmeling became determined to imitate his new hero. He began boxing in amateur competitions and, by 1924, won Germany's national amateur title in the light heavyweight division. Shortly thereafter, he turned professional. Ironically, though he idolised the raging, brawling Dempsey, Schmeling developed a careful, scientific style of fighting that lent itself more to counterpunching. Using this style, he won seventeen of his first twenty-three bouts, thirteen by knockout. In 1925, he got into the ring with Dempsey, who was then still heavyweight champion of the world and was touring Europe. Dempsey boxed for two rounds with the then-unknown German and, according to a story later told by Schmeling, was greatly impressed. He proved Dempsey's praises correct on 24 August 1926, when picking up the German light heavyweight championship with a first-round knockout of rival Max Diekmann, who had previously beaten Schmeling. The next year, Schmeling won the European championship by stopping Fernand Delarge in the first boxing match broadcast live in Germany. After defending both titles against Hein Domgoergen the same year and, in 1928, the European Title with a first-round knockout of Michele Bonaglia, he secured the German heavyweight championship with a points victory against Franz Diener and decided to chase bigger fights and bigger purses in the United States.

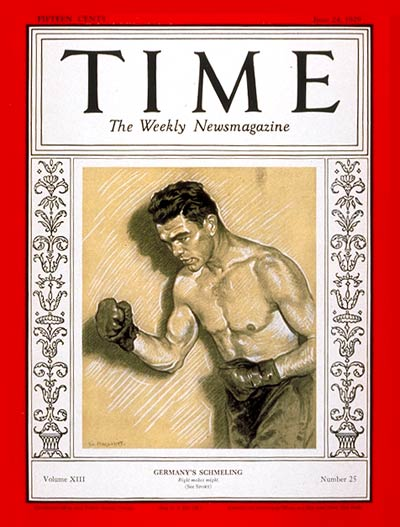
Max Schmeling on the cover of TIME Magazine. June 24, 1929

Arriving in New York City for the first time in 1928, Schmeling was hardly noticed by the American fight circles. Considered a stiff European fighter who had padded his record against German and European unknowns, he was given few opportunities to prove himself until he hooked up with American manager Joe Jacobs. Schmeling's debut in America took place at Madison Square Garden with an eighth-round knockout of Joe Monte, who was not a top-flight heavyweight but nonetheless had been in with some tough competition. Two more victories led to a fight with Johnny Risko, one of the biggest names in the division, though somewhat beyond his prime. On 1 February 1929, Schmeling floored Risko four times with his right hand before the referee halted the contest in the ninth round, handing Risko his only loss by TKO. The surprised crowd in attendance roared with appreciation and The Ring magazine subsequently recognized the win as its 'Fight of the Year.'

=== The "Low Blow Champion" ===
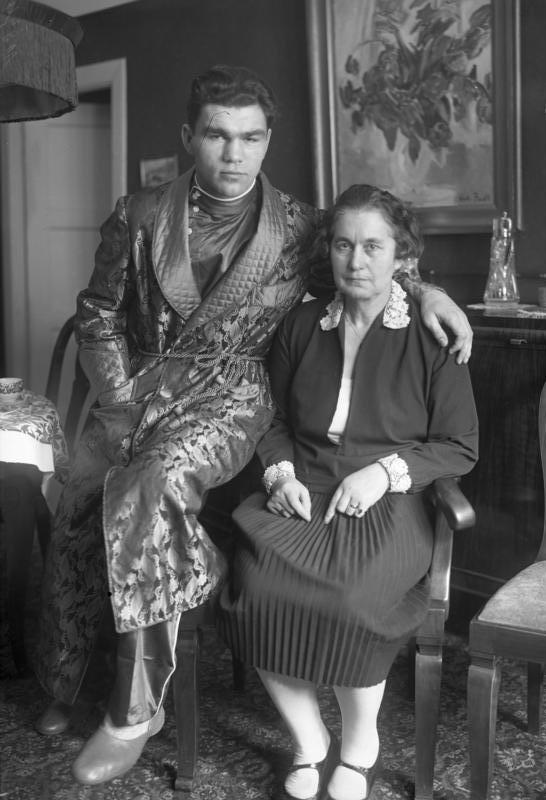
Max Schmeling with his mother Amanda Schmeling (née Fuchs) in 1931

When he defeated the highly regarded Spaniard Paulino Uzcudun with a fifteen-round decision at Yankee Stadium later that year, Schmeling was regarded as the foremost young contender in the division. With the World Heavyweight Champion Gene Tunney having recently retired, promoters arranged a matchup between the German and veteran contender Jack Sharkey to fill the vacancy. On 12 June 1930, at Yankee Stadium, in a fight billed as the 'Battle of the Continents,' Schmeling, known as a slow starter, fell slightly behind on points going into the fourth round. He was trying to corner his opponent when Sharkey let loose with a very fast, clear hit to the groin. Schmeling fell to the canvas, claiming to have been fouled. When manager Jacobs ran into the ring, prompting chaos, the referee disqualified Sharkey and declared Schmeling the victor and the first man to win the world heavyweight championship on a foul. The New York State Athletic Commission (NYSAC), reviewing the call, agreed.

The first European-born boxer to win the heavyweight championship in thirty-three years, Schmeling was also the first from Germany to hold the distinction. Still, the way in which he won the title proved an embarrassment. Called the 'low blow champion,' he was disparaged in both America and Europe as an unproven titleholder. When he initially refused to face Sharkey in a rematch, the NYSAC officially stripped him of their recognition as world champion, but he remained recognised by both the National Boxing Association (NBA) and The Ring magazine. Most of the criticism faded after Schmeling's first defence, a fifteen-round TKO over Young Stribling, a future hall-of-famer with 239 wins to his credit by 1931. In order to solidify his title as undisputed, Schmeling signed a contract to face the "Boston Gob" once more. On 21 June 1932, the championship picture became even more muddled when Sharkey won a highly controversial split decision, taking the championship. Many in attendance, including former heavyweight champion Gene Tunney and the mayor of New York, felt that Schmeling had proven himself the better man and was robbed. In losing the championship, the German had elevated his reputation in the minds of boxing fans.

=== Walker and Baer ===
When Schmeling faced Mickey Walker, the future hall-of-famer who had recently held Sharkey to a draw that many felt Walker deserved, it was thought that this fight was for the real heavyweight championship. Walker, a former welterweight, was a popular slugger who had won championships in two divisions but was at a considerable size disadvantage against the European. Though Walker took the lead on points, Schmeling dealt out a beating as the fight progressed. After eight rounds, Walker's corner threw in the towel, confirming Schmeling's status as the leading heavyweight in the world.

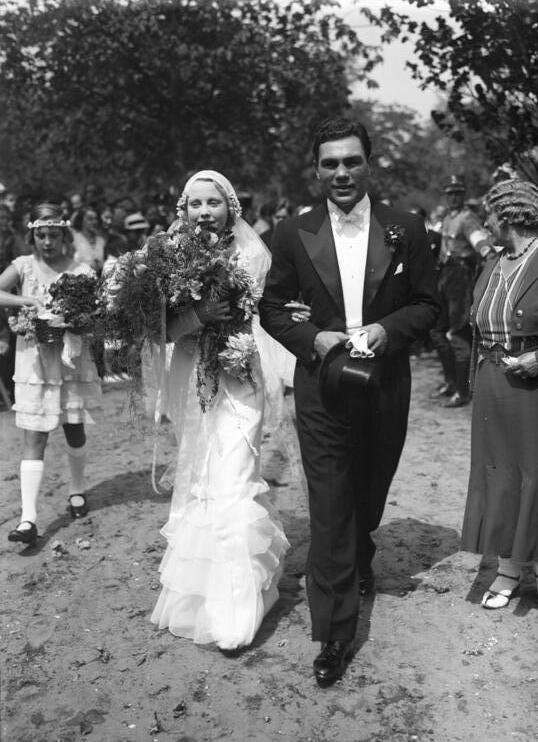
Wedding of Schmeling and Czech actress Anny Ondra in 1933. The couple remained married until Ondra's death in 1987.

With the coming of 1933, however, Schmeling's image in America began to take a decided turn. In 1932, the Nazi Party became the most powerful political force in Germany, and its ideologies, voiced by party leader Adolf Hitler, overflowed with anti-Semitic tendencies. Major American cities such as New York had large Jewish populations, who worried over what the party could mean for people of their religion in the future. Schmeling, because he was German, was viewed as an extension of Hitler's plans for world domination. When he was slated to fight heavy-hitting contender Max Baer on 8 June 1933, he immediately became the 'bad guy' in the eyes of fans. Baer, who did not practice the Jewish religion but had a Jewish father, came into the ring wearing the Star of David on his shorts. Promoter Jack Dempsey played up this angle and suddenly the fight was viewed as Baer defending his faith against the prejudice of the Nazis, represented reluctantly by Schmeling. Thrown off of his game in part by the bad publicity but also because of Baer's wild, brawling style and frequent fouls (including backhand punches and rabbit punches), Schmeling was thrashed after ten rounds before nearly 60,000 onlookers at Yankee Stadium. When the German took a battering against the ropes in the tenth, the referee leapt in to stop the fight. The fight, combined with a follow-up loss to contender Steve Hamas early the next year, left many wondering if Schmeling was still a world top-class fighter.

=== Versus Joe Louis ===
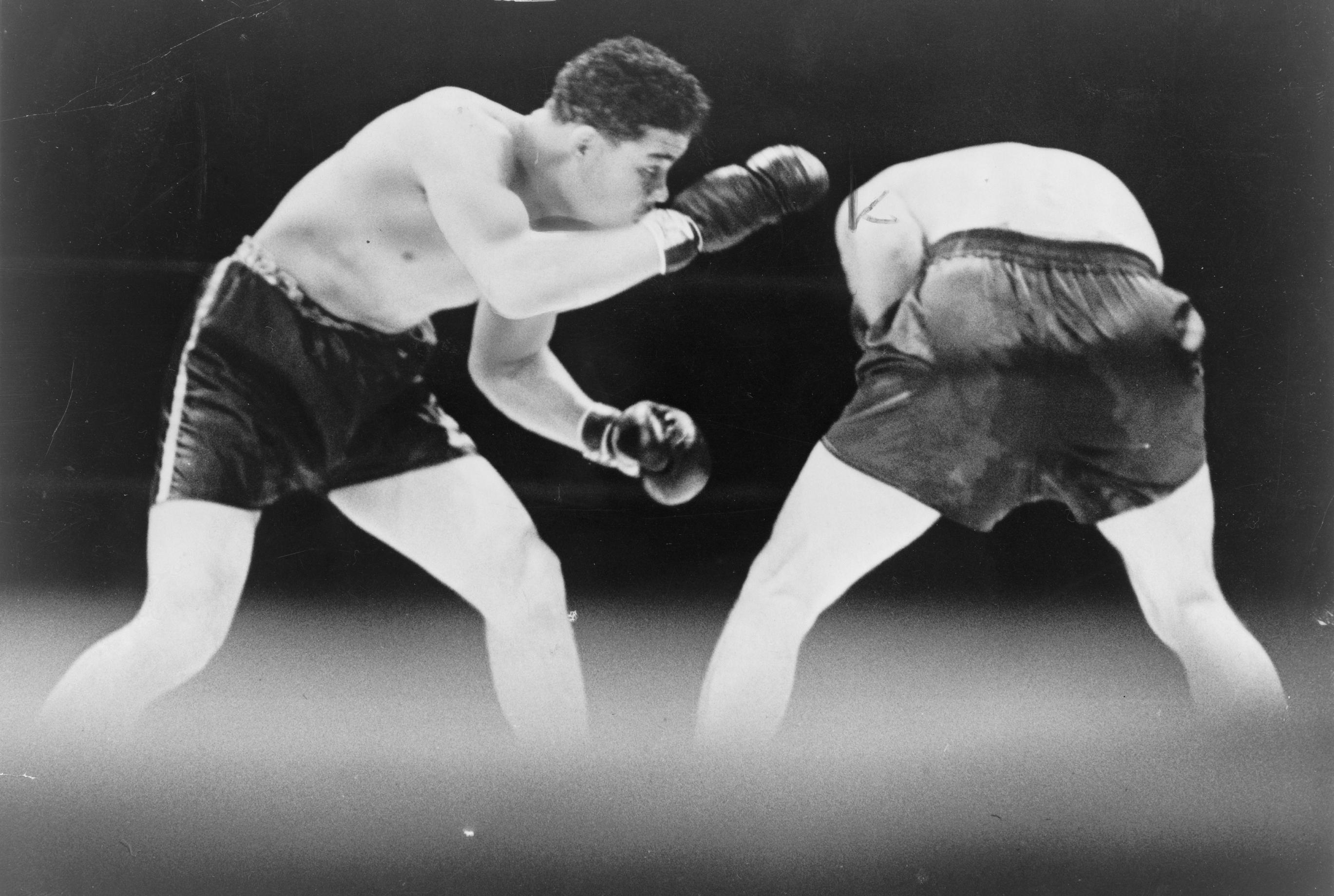
Louis vs. Schmeling, 1936

Returning to his native Germany, Schmeling won three of his next four fights, with one draw, including knockout wins over first Walter Neusel, then another avenging his previous loss to Steve Hamas. However, many among the American press and fans remained unmoved on the idea of rooting for Schmeling in light of the Nazi Party's behavior. Articles continued to be published declaring the German "washed up," a "has been," or a "Nazi puppet." When he was matched with undefeated boxing sensation Joe Louis in 1936 for the German's first fight on American soil in more than two years, he was clearly the betting underdog, considered a name opponent for Louis to roll over on his route to the title. Nevertheless, he was the number two contender for the title behind Louis. Prior to the match, Schmeling carefully studied films of Louis's prior fights, dissecting apparent flaws in the Detroit fighter's technique. Among the weaknesses he noticed was the fact that Louis lowered his left hand after throwing a left jab. In the ring, Schmeling exploited this subtle flaw to his own advantage, countering nearly every Louis jab with his best punch, the right cross. The fight proved to be a competitive, hard-hitting affair for the first three rounds, but, in the fourth, a counter right from the German dropped Louis for the first time in his career. Though Louis rose, he was badly dazed for the remainder of the fight. For a further eight rounds, Schmeling battered Louis, often standing toe-to-toe with the vaunted puncher and landing that same right hand to the jaw repeatedly. In the twelfth, he sent the American tumbling to the floor once more, and this time Louis could not recover. He was counted out on the floor, and Schmeling had scored the most talked-about sports upset of the year.

Now the unexpected number one contender for the heavyweight crown held by Jim Braddock, Schmeling looked forward to his chance to become the first fighter to regain the world heavyweight title by winning the fight with Braddock that had been scheduled for that September. The fight was postponed, however, when Braddock injured his hand in training. Rumors existed that the fight's organizers were stalling, afraid of the negative publicity that would be generated over a perceived Nazi getting a shot at the world's title. When it was confirmed that Braddock's managers were in talks with the Louis camp, the New York Commission officially released an order for Braddock to fight Schmeling for the title. Any other fight, with Louis or otherwise, would not be recognized by New York as being for the championship. The Madison Square Garden Corporation, the largest promotional company in the sport at the time, even attempted to get a legal injunction against a Braddock–Louis fight (Louis was not on their roster). Nonetheless, in February 1937, Schmeling received the news that the champion had indeed signed to defend his championship against Louis. A furious Schmeling protested, but to no avail, and he was forced to watch from ringside as Louis knocked Braddock out and gained the championship. Sorely disappointed and convinced that he would never receive his chance at redemption, Schmeling fought just once more in America, an eighth-round knockout of future contender Harry Thomas, before returning to Germany. In his native land, Schmeling was regarded as a hero and promoted by the Nazi propaganda machine as a perfect example of German supremacy over the rest of the world by virtue of his defeat of the current champion, Louis. The government ordered parades and rallies in his honor. He became a friend to Hitler and other powerful figures in the government and also a popular subject of newspaper articles and films. He continued to press for a chance at a rematch with Louis and in the meantime padded his record against overmatched fighters Ben Foord and Steve Dudas.

=== "Battle of the Century" ===
In 1938, champion Joe Louis announced that he would face Schmeling for the title. The rematch became an instant international sensation. Many clamored impatiently for its happening, but others, afraid of international tensions and the possibility of Hitler taking over the championship, protested. The controversy and ballyhoo led to the event becoming the most anticipated boxing match since the rematch between Dempsey and Gene Tunney, or possibly earlier. Louis, with his poor, lower-class roots, was adopted by American fans as the symbol of America as a land of opportunity. In contrast, Americans perceived Schmeling and his ties to Hitler as an obvious threat to those opportunities and ideals. When the German walked to the ring at Yankee Stadium on 22 June 1938, he did so under a hail of garbage thrown from the stands. Louis came out blazing in the first round and Schmeling tried to counter-punch as he had in the first bout, but to no avail. Driven into the ropes and battered with a fusillade of short, crisp blows from every angle, Schmeling turned his back to his opponent and clutched onto the ropes, letting out a scream that even years later, many spectators could recall vividly. Schmeling later said that he screamed because he had been hit with a blow to the kidneys. Schmeling's knees buckled under the punishment, and referee Arthur Donovan pushed Louis away, beginning a count on Schmeling. Schmeling reluctantly stepped away from the ropes, and Donovan allowed him to continue. A few punches later, Schmeling was knocked down again. From then on, he was helpless. He rose but fell moments later, and Donovan stopped the fight.

Many years later, in 1975, Schmeling said, "Looking back, I'm almost happy I lost that fight. Just imagine if I would have come back to Germany with a victory. I had nothing to do with the Nazis, but they would have given me a medal. After the war I might have been considered a war criminal."

=== Schmeling in his later years ===
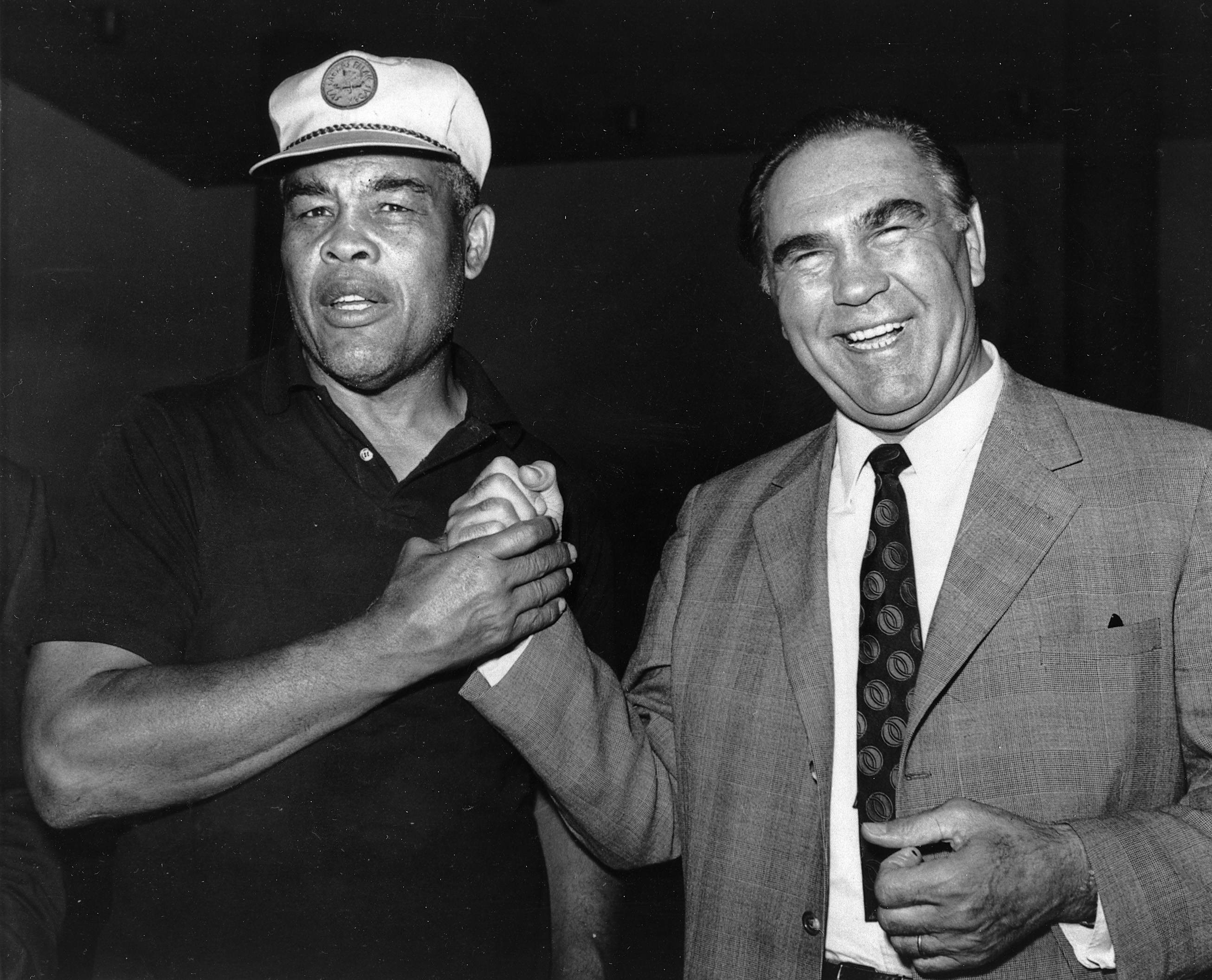
Joe Louis and Max Schmeling in 1971

When he returned to Germany after his defeat by Joe Louis, Schmeling was now shunned by the Nazis. He won both the German and European heavyweight championships on the same night, with a first-round knockout of Adolf Heuser. During the Nazi purge of Jews from Berlin, he personally saved the lives of two Jewish children by hiding them in his Excelsior hotel room in Berlin. He claimed he was sick and permitted no one to enter. It was not the first time that Schmeling defied the Nazi regime's hatred for Jews. As the story goes, Hitler let it be known through the Reich Ministry of Sports that he was very displeased at Schmeling's relationship with Joe Jacobs, his Jewish fight promoter, and wanted it terminated, but Schmeling refused to bow even to Hitler. During the war, Schmeling was drafted, where he served with the Luftwaffe and was trained as a paratrooper. He participated in the Battle of Crete in May 1941, where he was wounded in his right knee by mortar fire shrapnel during the first day of the battle. After recovering, he was dismissed from active service after being deemed medically unfit for duty because of his injury. Nevertheless, in July 1944 a rumor that he had been killed in action made world news. He later visited American POW camps in Germany and occasionally tried to improve conditions for the prisoners. By early 1945, he was spending his time giving exhibition bouts against British Free Corps member Eric Pleasants in German officers' messes.

After the war, Schmeling settled in Hamburg where in 1947, strapped for money, he embarked upon a moderately successful comeback in boxing, winning three of his five bouts with two point-defeats before re-entering retirement for good in October 1948.

Schmeling became a successful mink, chicken, and tobacco farmer in the early 1950s. Towards the end of the decade, after multiple meetings with The Coca-Cola Company's offices in Germany, Schmeling became the face of 'Cocacolonization' and Coca-Cola's reentry into Germany. Before long, he owned his own bottling plant and held an executive's position within the company. Schmeling helped bring vending machines into use in Germany.

He became friends with Joe Louis and he assisted his former rival financially in his later years, eventually financing his funeral in 1981.

During a Los Angeles Times interview in the 1980s rising tennis star Steffi Graf asked Schmeling how he maintained his popularity. Schmeling replied, stating that ‘I told her that a smile doesn’t cost anything and your fans won’t forget it. And, most important, to keep both feet on the ground.’

In 1996 an arena opened in Berlin was named the Max-Schmeling-Halle in Schmeling's honor. The opening ceremony took place on December 14, 1996, with Schmeling in attendance for the event.

His wife of 54 years, the Czech-born actress Anny Ondra, died in 1987. In 1992, he was inducted into the International Boxing Hall of Fame. His autobiography, Max Schmeling: An Autobiography, was published in 1994. He lived his remaining years as a wealthy man and avid boxing fan, dying on 2 February 2005, at the age of 99. There was a memorial held in Schmeling's honor following his death which was attended by many important German figures.

There is a memorial stone located in front of the house where Schmeling was born in Klein Luckow.

In 2010, a bronze statue of Schmeling was erected in Hollenstedt.

== Honours ==
- German Light Heavyweight Champion 1926–1928
- European Light Heavyweight Champion 1927–1928
- German Heavyweight Champion 1928
- World Heavyweight Champion 1930–1932
- European Heavyweight Champion 1939–1943
- Inducted into the International Boxing Hall of Fame in 1992.
- Inducted into Germany's Sports Hall of Fame in 2006.

== Legacy ==
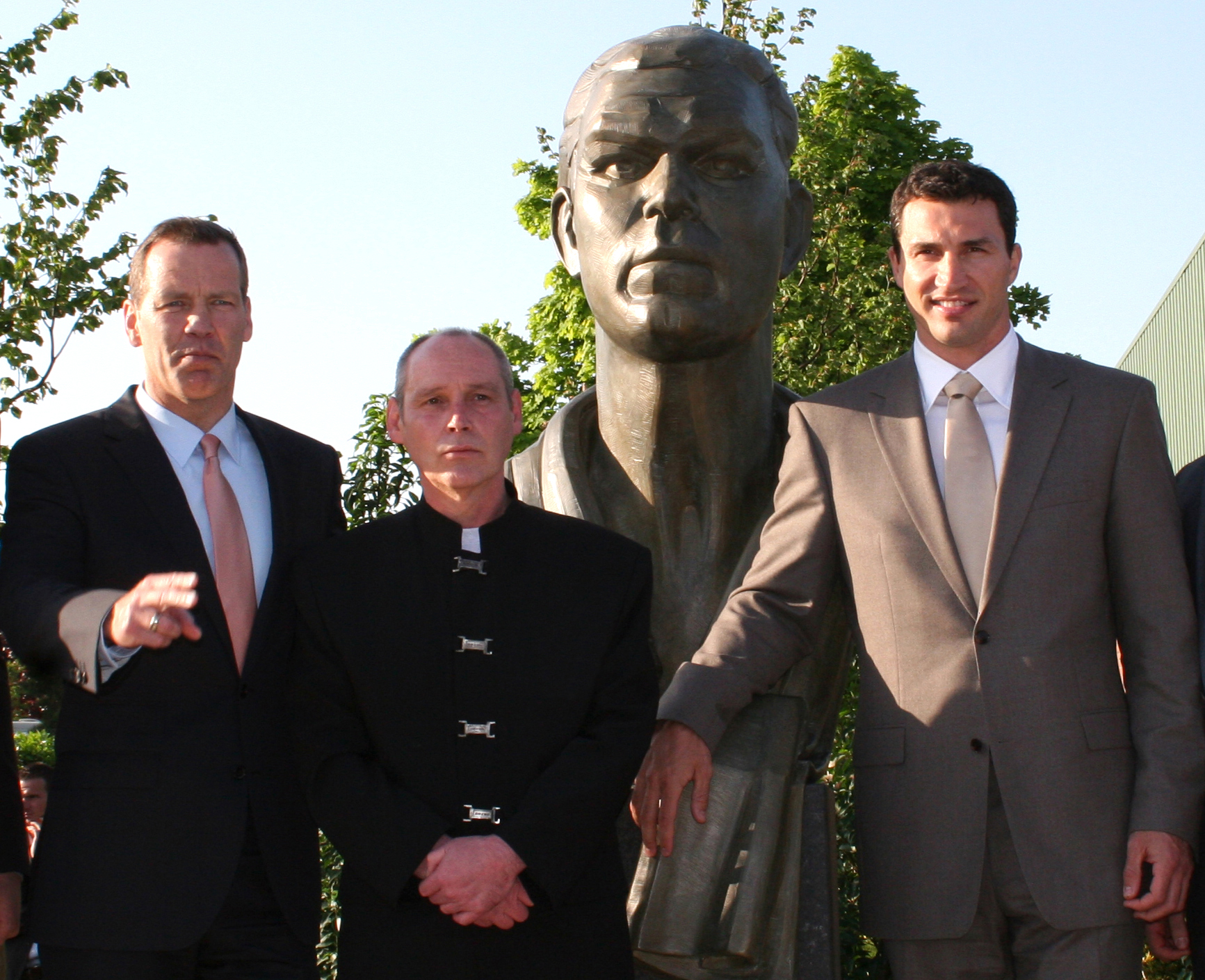
Henry Maske and Wladimir Klitschko, after the unveiling of the Max Schmeling monument in Hollenstedt on 21 May 2010

Schmeling lived in Stettin, Germany (now known as Szczecin, Poland); a band from this city, The Analogs, recorded the song "Max Schmeling" on their album Hlaskover rock (2000). Schmeling briefly appears as himself in the film The Zurich Engagement (1957).

In 2005, Österreichische Post issued a stamp commemorating Max Schmeling, based on the 1926 painting by German artist George Grosz.

Louis and Schmeling's friendship was dramatised in the 2002 made-for-TV biopic Joe and Max. Schmeling was portrayed by German actor Til Schweiger.

The climactic fight between American Rocky Balboa and Russian Ivan Drago in Rocky IV was inspired by the bout between Joe Louis and Max Schmeling, updated to reflect Cold War tensions.

== Honorary residencies ==
- Honorary Resident of the City of Los Angeles
- Honorary Resident of Las Vegas
- Honorary Resident of Klein-Luckow (his hometown)
- Honorary Member of the Austrian Boxing Federation

== Professional boxing record ==
70 fights	56 wins	10 losses
By knockout	39	5
By decision	14	5
By disqualification	3	0
Draws	4	

No.	Result	Record	Opponent	Type	Round, time	Date	Location	Notes
70	Loss	56–10–4	Richard Vogt	PTS	10	31 Oct 1948	VFB Platz, Kiel, Germany	
69	Win	56–9–4	Hans Joachim Draegestein	TKO	9 (10)	2 Oct 1948	VFB Platz, Kiel, Germany	
68	Loss	55–9–4	Walter Neusel	PTS	10	23 May 1948	Platz in Hamburg-Altona, Hamburg, Germany	
67	Win	55–8–4	Hans Joachim Draegestein	PTS	10	7 Dec 1947	Omnibushalle, Hamburg, Germany	
66	Win	54–8–4	Werner Vollmer	KO	7 (10)	28 Sep 1947	Waldstadion, Frankfurt, Germany	
65	Win	53–8–4	Adolf Heuser	KO	1 (15)	2 Jul 1939	Adolf-Hitler-Kampfbahn, Stuttgart, Germany	Won European and German BDB heavyweight titles
64	Loss	52–8–4	Joe Louis	TKO	1 (15), 2:04	22 Jun 1938	Yankee Stadium, Bronx, U.S.	For NYSAC, NBA, and The Ring heavyweight titles
63	Win	52–7–4	Steve Dudas	KO	5 (15)	16 Apr 1938	Hanseatenhalle, Hamburg, Germany	
62	Win	51–7–4	Ben Foord	PTS	12	30 Jan 1938	Hanseatenhalle, Hamburg, Germany	
61	Win	50–7–4	Harry Thomas	TKO	8 (15)	13 Dec 1937	Madison Square Garden, New York City, New York, U.S.	
60	Win	49–7–4	Joe Louis	KO	12 (15), 2:29	19 Jun 1936	Yankee Stadium, Bronx, U.S.	
59	Win	48–7–4	Paulino Uzcudun	PTS	12	7 Jul 1935	Poststadion, Berlin, Germany	
58	Win	47–7–4	Steve Hamas	KO	9 (12)	10 Mar 1935	Hanseatenhalle, Hamburg, Germany	
57	Win	46–7–4	Walter Neusel	TKO	9 (12)	26 Aug 1934	Sandbahn Lokstedt, Hamburg, Germany	
56	Draw	45–7–4	Paulino Uzcudun	MD	12	13 May 1934	Estadio Olímpico de Montjuïc, Barcelona, Spain	
55	Loss	45–7–3	Steve Hamas	UD	12	13 Feb 1934	Philadelphia Convention Hall, Philadelphia, Pennsylvania, U.S.	
54	Loss	45–6–3	Max Baer	TKO	10 (15), 1:51	8 Jun 1933	Yankee Stadium, Bronx, New York, U.S.	
53	Win	45–5–3	Mickey Walker	TKO	8 (15)	26 Sep 1932	Madison Square Garden Bowl, Queens, New York, U.S.	
52	Loss	44–5–3	Jack Sharkey	SD	15	21 Jun 1932	Madison Square Garden Bowl, Queens, New York, U.S.	Lost NYSAC, NBA, and The Ring heavyweight titles
51	Win	44–4–3	Young Stribling	TKO	15 (15), 2:46	3 Jul 1931	Municipal Stadium, Cleveland, Ohio, U.S.	Retained NBA and The Ring heavyweight titles
50	Win	43–4–3	Jack Sharkey	DQ	4 (15), 2:55	12 Jun 1930	Yankee Stadium, Bronx, New York, U.S.	Won vacant NYSAC, NBA, and The Ring heavyweight titles
49	Win	42–4–3	Paulino Uzcudun	PTS	15	27 Jun 1929	Yankee Stadium, Bronx, New York, U.S.	
48	Win	41–4–3	Johnny Risko	TKO	9 (15)	1 Feb 1929	Madison Square Garden, New York City, New York, U.S.	
47	Win	40–4–3	Pietro Corri	KO	1 (10)	21 Jan 1929	Laurel Garden, Newark, New Jersey, U.S.	
46	Win	39–4–3	Joe Sekyra	PTS	10	4 Jan 1929	Madison Square Garden, New York City, New York, U.S.	
45	Win	38–4–3	Joe Monte	KO	8 (10)	23 Nov 1928	Madison Square Garden, New York City, New York, U.S.	
44	Win	37–4–3	Franz Diener	PTS	15	4 Apr 1928	Berlin Sportpalast, Berlin, Germany	Won vacant German BDB heavyweight title
43	Win	36–4–3	Ted Moore	PTS	10	11 Mar 1928	Westfalenhallen, Dortmund, Germany	
42	Loss	35–4–3	Gipsy Daniels	KO	1 (10)	25 Feb 1928	Festhalle Frankfurt, Frankfurt, Germany	
41	Win	35–3–3	Michele Bonaglia	KO	1 (15), 2:31	6 Jan 1928	Berlin Sportpalast, Berlin, Germany	Retained European light-heavyweight title
40	Win	34–3–3	Gipsy Daniels	PTS	10	2 Dec 1927	Berlin Sportpalast, Berlin, Germany	
39	Win	33–3–3	Hein Domgoergen	KO	7 (15)	6 Nov 1927	Achilleion, Leipzig, Germany	Retained European and German BDB light-heavyweight titles
38	Win	32–3–3	Louis Clement	TKO	6 (10)	2 Oct 1927	Westfalenhallen, Dortmund, Germany	
37	Win	31–3–3	Robert Larsen	TKO	3 (10)	2 Sep 1927	Berlin Sportpalast, Berlin, Germany	
36	Win	30–3–3	Willem Westbroek	KO	3 (10)	7 Aug 1927	Radrennbahn, Essen, Germany	
35	Win	29–3–3	Jack Taylor	PTS	10	1 Aug 1927	Sagebiel, Hamburg, Germany	
34	Win	28–3–3	Fernand Delarge	KO	14 (15)	19 Jun 1927	Westfalenhallen, Dortmund, Germany	Won European light-heavyweight title
33	Win	27–3–3	Raoul Paillaux	KO	3 (10)	17 May 1927	Sagebiel, Hamburg, Germany	
32	Win	26–3–3	Robert Larsen	PTS	10	8 May 1927	Stadion Radrennbah, Frankfurt, Germany	
31	Win	25–3–3	Stanley Glen	KO	1 (10)	26 Apr 1927	Berlin Sportpalast, Berlin, Germany	
30	Win	24–3–3	Francois Charles	TKO	8 (10)	8 Apr 1927	Berlin Sportpalast, Berlin, Germany	
29	Win	23–3–3	Leon Sebilo	KO	2 (10)	12 Mar 1927	Westfalenhallen, Dortmund, Germany	
28	Win	22–3–3	Joe Mehling	TKO	3 (10)	4 Feb 1927	Zirkus Sarassani, Dresden, Germany	
27	Win	21–3–3	Louis Wilms	TKO	8 (10)	23 Jan 1927	Jahrhunderthalle, Breslau, Germany (now Wrocław, Poland)	
26	Win	20–3–3	Jack Stanley	KO	8 (10)	7 Jan 1927	Berlin Sportpalast, Berlin, Germany	
25	Win	19–3–3	Herman van 't Hof	DQ	8 (10)	1 Oct 1926	Berlin Sportpalast, Berlin, Germany	
24	Win	18–3–3	Max Diekmann	KO	1 (15), 0:30	24 Aug 1926	Luna Park, Berlin, Germany	Won vacant German BDB light-heavyweight title
23	Win	17–3–3	Aug Vongehr	TKO	1 (4)	13 Jul 1926	Luna Park, Berlin, Germany	
22	Win	16–3–3	Willy Louis	KO	1 (6)	19 Mar 1926	Hochhaus-Sportschule, Cologne, Germany	
21	Draw	15–3–3	Max Diekmann	PTS	8	12 Feb 1926	Kaiserdamm Arena, Berlin, Germany	
20	Win	15–3–2	René Compère	PTS	8	8 Nov 1925	Bickendorfer Festhalle, Cologne, Germany	
19	Loss	14–3–2	Larry Gains	TKO	2 (10)	28 Aug 1925	Kristallpalast, Cologne, Germany	
18	Draw	14–2–2	Leon Randol	PTS	10	9 May 1925	Brussels, Belgium	
17	Loss	14–2–1	Jack Taylor	PTS	10	9 May 1925	Messehalle, Cologne, Germany	
16	Win	14–1–1	Fred Hammer	PTS	10	28 Apr 1925	Beethovenhalle, Bonn, Germany	
15	Draw	13–1–1	Jimmy Lyggett Sr	PTS	8	3 Apr 1925	Berlin Sportpalast, Berlin, Germany	
14	Win	13–1	Alfred Baker	KO	8 (8)	15 Mar 1925	Schauburgring, Cologne, Germany	
13	Win	12–1	Leon Randol	KO	4 (8)	1 Mar 1925	Schauburgring, Cologne, Germany	
12	Win	11–1	Joe Mehling	PTS	6	20 Jan 1925	Kriegervereinshaus, Berlin, Germany	
11	Win	10–1	Johnny Cludts	KO	2 (8)	18 Jan 1925	Schauburgring, Cologne, Germany	
10	Win	9–1	Jimmy Lyggett Sr	DQ	4 (10)	26 Dec 1924	Bickendorfer Festhalle, Cologne, Germany	
9	Win	8–1	Richard Hartig	KO	1 (10)	17 Dec 1924	Saalbau Friedrichshain, Berlin, Germany	
8	Win	7–1	Battling Mathar	KO	3 (10)	7 Dec 1924	Tonhalle Düsseldorf, Düsseldorf, Germany	
7	Win	6–1	Hans Breuer	KO	2 (10)	4 Dec 1924	Colonia-Haus, Cologne, Germany	
6	Win	5–1	Fred Hammer	KO	3	31 Oct 1924	Bickendorfer Festhalle, Cologne, Germany	
5	Loss	4–1	Max Diekmann	RTD	4 (6)	10 Oct 1924	Berlin Sportpalast, Berlin, Germany	
4	Win	4–0	Rocky Knight	PTS	8	4 Oct 1924	Bickendorfer Festhalle, Cologne, Germany	
3	Win	3–0	Willy Louis	KO	1	20 Sep 1924	Duisburg, Germany	
2	Win	2–0	Henri van der Vyver	KO	3 (8)	19 Sep 1924	Bickendorfer Festhalle, Cologne, Germany	
1	Win	1–0	Hans Czapp	KO	6	2 Aug 1924	Tonhalle Düsseldorf, Düsseldorf, Germany	

== Titles in boxing ==
=== Major world titles ===
- NYSAC heavyweight champion (200+ lbs) (2×) (Note: Schmeling was stripped of his NYSAC title on January 6, 1931, but was reinstated on January 22, 1932.)
- NBA (WBA) heavyweight champion (200+ lbs)

=== The Ring magazine titles ===
- The Ring heavyweight champion (200+ lbs)

=== Regional/International titles ===
- European light heavyweight champion (175 lbs)
- German (BDB) light heavyweight champion (175 lbs)
- European heavyweight champion (200+ lbs)
- German (BDB) heavyweight champion (200+ lbs) (2×)

=== Undisputed titles ===
- Undisputed heavyweight champion (2×)

== Literature and media ==
- Kluge, Volker:Max Schmeling. Aufbau, Berlin 2004, ISBN 3-351-02570-X.
- Krauß, Martin: Schmeling. Die Karriere eines Jahrhundertdeutschen. Die Werkstatt, Göttingen 2005, ISBN 3-89533-472-3.
- David Margolick: Beyond Glory. Joe Louis Vs. Max Schmeling, and a World on the Brink. Knopf, New York 2005, ISBN 978-0-375-41192-2.
- Pfeifer, David: Max Schmeling – Berufsboxer, Propagandafigur. Unternehmer. Die Geschichte eines deutschen Idols. Campus, Frankfurt am Main 2005, ISBN 3-593-37546-X.
- Max Schmeling erzählt aus seinem Leben. Berührung. Hörbuch. Unterlauf & Zschiedrich Hörbuchverlag Berlin 2003, ISBN 978-3-934384-28-6.
- David Pfeifer (2007). "Schmeling, Max Siegfried Adolph Otto". Neue Deutsche Biographie (in German). Vol. 23. Berlin: Duncker & Humblot. pp. 125–126. (full text online).

=== Films ===
- Joe & Max. Fernsehfilm, USA, Deutschland, 2002, 109 Min., Regie: Steve, u.a. mit Til Schweiger als Max Schmeling
- ARD-Legenden: Max Schmeling. Dokumentation, ARD 2003, 45 Min., Regie: Michael Wulfes
- Der Kampf des Jahrhunderts. Max Schmeling gegen Joe Louis. Dokumentation, USA, 2004, 87 Min., Regie: Barak Goodman, von Phoenix
- Max Schmeling. Kinofilm, Bundesrepublik Deutschland, 2010, 123 min., Regie: Uwe Boll, mit Henry Maske als Max Schmeling, Susanne Wuest als Anny Ondra, Vladimir Weigl als Joe Jacobs, u.v.a.

== See also ==
- List of heavyweight boxing champions
- List of European Boxing Union heavyweight champions

== Notes and references ==
=== References ===
Sporting positions
World boxing titles
Vacant Title last held by Gene Tunney	NYSAC heavyweight champion 12 June 1930 – 6 January 1931; Stripped	Vacant Title next held by Himself
Vacant Title last held by Gene Tunney	NBA heavyweight champion 12 June 1930 – 21 June 1932	Succeeded by Jack Sharkey
Vacant Title last held by Gene Tunney	The Ring heavyweight champion 12 June 1930 – 21 June 1932	Succeeded by Jack Sharkey
Vacant Title last held by Gene Tunney	Undisputed heavyweight champion 12 June 1930 – 21 June 1932	Succeeded by Jack Sharkey
Vacant Title last held by Himself	NYSAC heavyweight champion 22 January 1932 – 21 June 1932	Succeeded by Jack Sharkey

Awards
Preceded by Tommy Loughran W15 Leo Lomski (January 6, 1928)	Ring Magazine Fight of the Year; 1929—TKO9 Johnny Risko (February 1)	Succeeded by Jackie Kid Berg W10 Kid Chocolate (August 7, 1930)
Preceded by Jackie Kid Berg W10 Kid Chocolate (August 7, 1930)	Ring Magazine Fight of the Year; 1931—TKO15 Young Stribling (July 4)	Succeeded by Tony Canzoneri W15 Billy Petrolle (November 4, 1932)
Preceded by Tony Canzoneri W15 Billy Petrolle (November 4, 1932)	Ring Magazine Fight of the Year; 1933—TKOby10 Max Baer (June 8)	Succeeded by Barney Ross W15 Jimmy McLarnin (May 28, 1934)
Preceded by Joe Louis KO4 Max Baer (September 24, 1935)	Ring Magazine Fight of the Year; 1936—KO12 Joe Louis (June 19)	Succeeded by Joe Louis W15 Tommy Farr (August 30, 1937)
Preceded by Tommy Loughran (1929)	Ring Magazine Fighter of the Year; 1930	Succeeded by Tommy Loughran (1931)
