= Steve Hamas =

American football player and boxer (1907–1974)

Profile
- Position: Fullback

Personal information
- Born: January 9, 1907; Passaic, New Jersey, US
- Died: October 11, 1974 (aged 67); Northport, New York, US
- Listed height: 6 ft 0 in (1.83 m)
- Listed weight: 195 lb (88 kg)

Career information
- High school: East Rutherford (NJ)
- College: Penn State

Career history
- Orange Tornadoes (1929)

Career statistics
- Games: 12

Steven Vincent Hamas (January 9, 1907 – October 11, 1974), also known as Hurricane and the Passaic Pounder, was an American football player and boxer. He was a multi-sport athlete at Pennsylvania State University in the late 1920s, receiving 12 varsity letters in football, boxing, lacrosse, basketball, and track and field. He played professional football in the National Football League (NFL) in 1929 and before turning to professional boxing, defeating former light heavyweight champion Tommy Loughran and former heavyweight champion Max Schmeling. He compiled a 35–4–2 in 41 bouts.

== Early life ==
Hamas was born in 1907 in Passaic, New Jersey. His father was an immigrant from Austria-Hungary who operated a tavern. His mother died when he was a boy. The family moved to Wallington, New Jersey, and Hamas transferred from Passaic High School to East Rutherford High School where he had "a fabulous athletic career."

== Penn State ==
He enrolled at Pennsylvania State University on a football scholarship. He played for Penn State Nittany Lions football team where coach Hugo Bezdek played him at center, tackle, end, and halfback, and dubbed him the "All-American substitute." He was a five-sport star at Penn State, competing in football, basketball, track and field (shot put, discus, and hammer throw), and lacrosse.

Although he had never boxed before, Penn State boxing coach Leo Houck recruited Hamas to spar with his roommate and the team's light heavyweight star, Marty McAndrews. His progress was slowed by a broken wrist, and he underwent an operation to straighten the wrist. He defeated "Dynamite Joe" LaVoti of Syracuse in his first meet and went on to win the national collegiate championship. Hamas was the first athlete in Penn State history to receive 12 varsity letters, and as of 2015, the feat had been matched only by Tubby Crawford in the 1940s.

== Professional football ==
He played professional football in the National Football League (NFL) as a fullback for the Orange Tornadoes. He appeared in 12 NFL games, five as a starter, during the 1929 season.

== Professional boxing ==
After his football career ended, Hamas competed as a professional boxer in the heavyweight division. He won his first 29 bouts. He twice defeated former light-heavyweight champion Tommy Loughran, and in February 1934, he also defeated former champion Max Schmeling.

In a rematch with Schmeling in March 1935 in Hamburg, Germany, Hamas suffered a pre-fight injury, tearing a tendon in his left elbow while training in Hamburg. He was not fit to fight in the rematch as the pain from the injury severely limited his ability to strike with his left arm. Schmeling showed no mercy, and Hamas injured his knee falling to the mat and lost badly, the only fight that Hamas did not finish in his career. Hamas was hospitalized for months after the fight, suffering a concussion and having his left side paralyzed for three years. He did not fight again.

Hamas had 41 professional bouts from 1930 to 1935, winning 35 (27 by knockout), losing four (twice to Loughran, once to Schmeling, and once to Lee Ramage), and two draws.

== Later life ==
During World War II, Hamas served in the United States Army Air Forces and attained the rank of major. He was assigned to physical fitness training for airmen. After the war, he worked as a copper salesman, for the Wright Aeronautical Company, and later for the New Jersey Department of Motor Vehicles. He died in 1974 at age 67.
