= Jack Humbeeck =

Belgian boxer

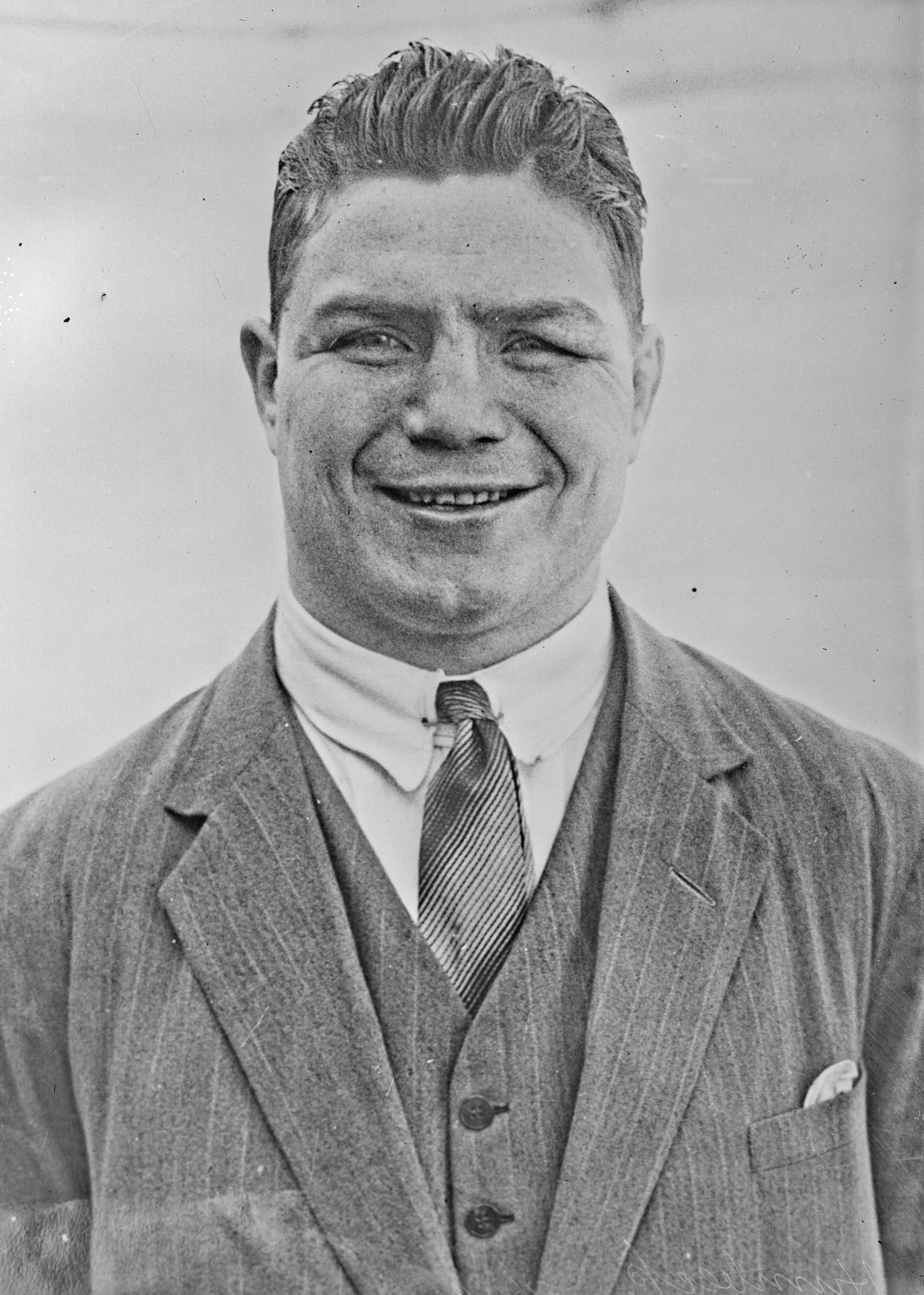
- Jack Humbeeck in 1927

Personal information
- Nationality: Belgian
- Born: Jacques Van Humbeeck; 5 June 1904
- Height: 186 cm (6 ft 1 in)
- Weight: heavyweight

Boxing career

Boxing record
- Total fights: 105
- Wins: 42
- Losses: 50
- Draws: 13

Jack Humbeeck also written as Jaak van Humbeeck (born 5 June 1904) was a Belgian boxer. He competed in the heavyweight category. He competed at international competitions and fought between 1921 and 1933.

== Career ==
Humbeeck made his debut on 20 May 1921 in Antwerp against Boudinon and won. During his career he had 105 fights, winning 42 of them (50 losses, 13 draws). He won 36.59% of his fights via KOs.

Humbeeck became national champion for the first time in 1922 and became it many times more until 1927. In 1923, he won the European title. He fought his last match against Arthur Meurant on 23 October 1933, which he lost.
