= Fernand Delarge =

Belgian boxer

Personal information
- Nationality: Belgium
- Born: Fernand Delarge; 13 April 1904 Liège, Belgium
- Died: 14 September 1960 (aged 56) Liège, Belgium
- Weight: Light heavyweight

Boxing career

Boxing record
- Total fights: 65
- Wins: 28
- Win by KO: 13
- Losses: 27
- Draws: 9

Fernand Delarge (13 April 1904 – 14 September 1960) was a Belgian boxer who competed in the 1924 Summer Olympics. He was born in Liège.

In 1924 he was eliminated in the first round of the light heavyweight class after losing to the upcoming bronze medallist Sverre Sørsdal.

After the Olympics Delarge turned pro and won the European Championship in 1926 against Herman van't Hoff. After two successful title defences he lost the title to Max Schmeling in 1927.

Delarge died in Liège on 14 September 1960 at the age of 56.
