= Klein Luckow =

- Ortsteil of Jatznick
- Interactive map of Klein Luckow
- Location within Germany Location within Mecklenburg-Vorpommern
- Coordinates: 53°33′12″N 13°50′17″E
- Country: Germany
- State: Mecklenburg-Vorpommern
- District: Vorpommern-Greifswald
- Municipality: Jatznick

Area
  - Total: 19.40 km^{2} (7.49 sq mi)
- Elevation: 57 m (187 ft)

Population (2011-12-31)
  - Total: 220
  - Density: 11/km^{2} (29/sq mi)
- Time zone: UTC+01:00 (CET)
  - Summer (DST): UTC+02:00 (CEST)
- Postal codes: 17337
- Dialling codes: 039752
- Vehicle registration: VG

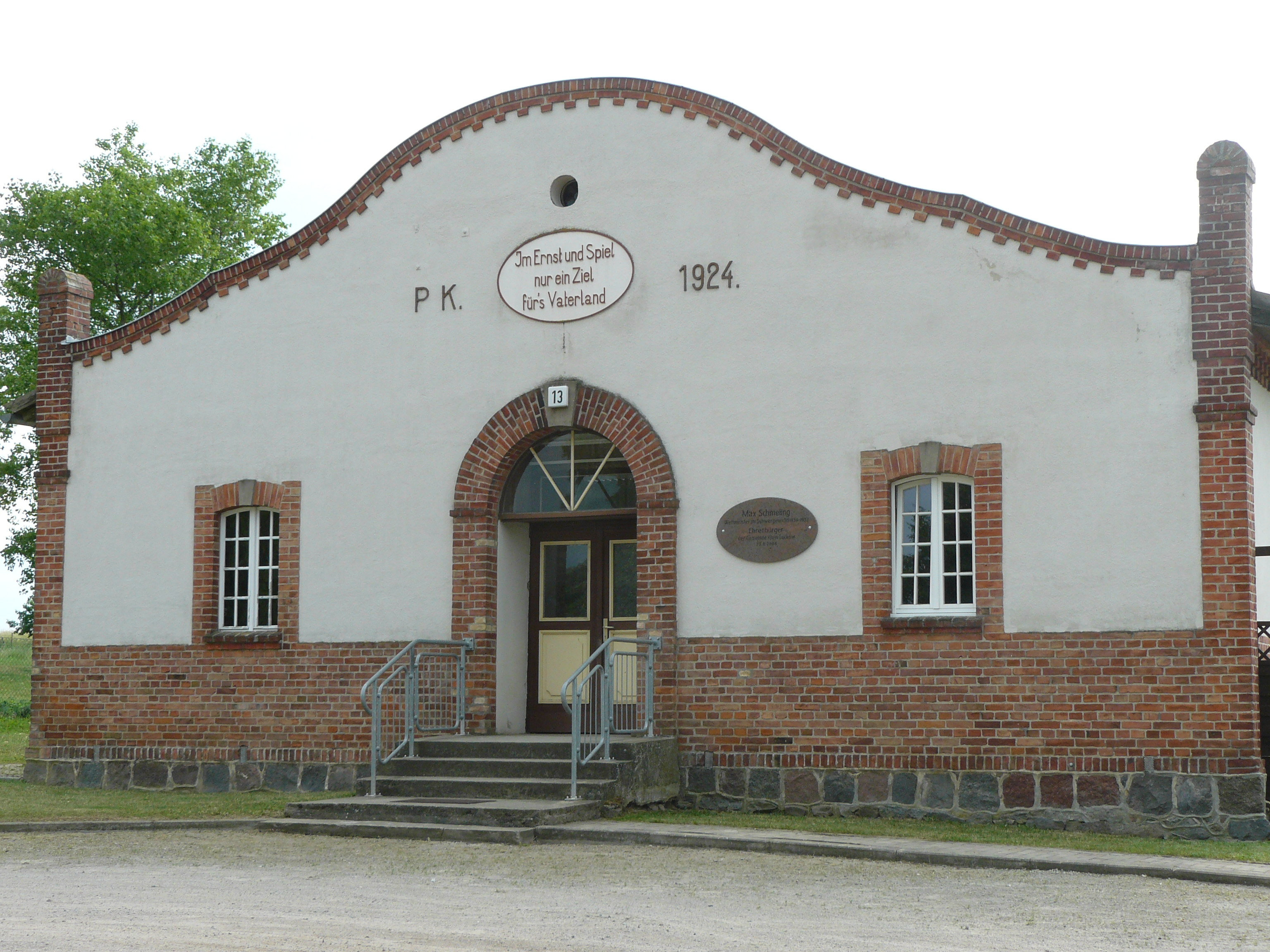
Klein Luckow, 2012.

Klein Luckow is a village and a former municipality in the Vorpommern-Greifswald district, in Mecklenburg-Vorpommern, Germany. Since 1 January 2012, it is part of the municipality Jatznick.

== Notable residents ==
- Max Schmeling (1905–2005) a German boxer who was heavyweight champion of the world between 1930 and 1932
