= Civil War Era National Cemeteries MPS =

Cover documentation in the U.S. National Register of Historic Places

The following cemeteries were added to the National Register of Historic Places as part of the Civil War Era National Cemeteries Multiple Property Submission (or MPS).

Resource Name	Also known as	Address	City	County	State	Added
Fayetteville National Cemetery		700 Government Ave.	Fayetteville	Washington County	Arkansas	July 28, 1999
Fort Smith National Cemetery		522 Garland Ave. and S. 6th St.	Fort Smith	Sebastian County	Arkansas	May 20, 1999
Little Rock National Cemetery		2523 Confederate Blvd.	Little Rock	Pulaski County	Arkansas	December 20, 1996
Barrancas National Cemetery		80 Hovey Road	Pensacola	Escambia County	Florida	February 12, 1998
Marietta National Cemetery		500 Washington Ave.	Marietta	Cobb County	Georgia	September 18, 1998
Alton National Cemetery		600 Pearl St.	Alton	Madison County	Illinois	May 5, 2011
Camp Butler National Cemetery		5063 Camp Butler Rd.	Springfield	Sangamon County	Illinois	August 15, 1997
Mound City National Cemetery		Jct. of IL 37 and US 51	Mound City	Pulaski County	Illinois	October 8, 1997
Quincy National Cemetery		36th & Main Sts	Quincy	Adams County	Illinois	May 6, 2011
Rock Island National Cemetery		0.25 mi N of southern tip of Rock Island	Moline	Rock Island County	Illinois	June 13, 1997
Crown Hill National Cemetery		700 W. 38th St.	Indianapolis	Marion County	Indiana	April 29, 1999
New Albany National Cemetery		1943 Ekin Ave.	New Albany	Floyd County	Indiana	June 25, 1999
Keokuk National Cemetery		1701 J St.	Keokuk	Lee County	Iowa	June 4, 1997
Fort Leavenworth National Cemetery		Within Fort Leavenworth military reservation	Fort Leavenworth	Leavenworth County	Kansas	July 15, 1999
Fort Scott National Cemetery		900 East National Ave.	Fort Scott	Bourbon County	Kansas	July 15, 1999
Camp Nelson National Cemetery		6890 Danville Rd.	Nicholasville	Jessamine County	Kentucky	September 3, 1998
Cave Hill National Cemetery		701 Baxter Ave.	Louisville	Jefferson County	Kentucky	September 3, 1998
Danville National Cemetery		277 N. First St.	Danville	Boyle County	Kentucky	May 29, 1998
Lexington National Cemetery		833 W. Main St.	Lexington	Fayette County	Kentucky	September 3, 1998
Mill Springs National Cemetery		9044 West Hwy 80	Nancy	Pulaski County	Kentucky	May 29, 1998
Alexandria National Cemetery		209 Shamrock Ave.	Pineville	Rapides Parish	Louisiana	July 9, 1997
Baton Rouge National Cemetery		220 N. 19th St.	Baton Rouge	East Baton Rouge Parish	Louisiana	July 9, 1997
Port Hudson National Cemetery		20978 Port Hickey Rd.	Zachary	East Baton Rouge Parish	Louisiana	May 20, 1999
Annapolis National Cemetery		800 West St.	Annapolis	Anne Arundel County	Maryland	June 13, 1996
Loudon Park National Cemetery		3445 Frederick Ave.	Baltimore	Baltimore County	Maryland	June 20, 1996
Corinth National Cemetery		1551 Horton St.	Corinth	Alcorn County	Mississippi	November 20, 1996
Natchez National Cemetery		41 Cemetery Rd.	Natchez	Adams County	Mississippi	November 22, 1999
Jefferson Barracks National Cemetery		2900 Sheridan Rd.	Green Park	St. Louis County	Missouri	July 9, 1998
Jefferson City National Cemetery		1024 E. McCarty St.	Jefferson City	Cole County	Missouri	October 1, 1998
Springfield National Cemetery		1702 E. Seminole St.	Springfield	Greene County	Missouri	August 27, 1999
Beverly National Cemetery		Bridgeboro Rd., jct. of Mt. Holly, and Bridgeboro Rds.	Edgewater Park Township	Burlington County	New Jersey	October 15, 1997
Cypress Hills National Cemetery		625 Jamaica Ave.	Brooklyn	Kings County	New York	November 13, 1997
New Bern National Cemetery		1711 National Ave.	New Bern	Craven County	North Carolina	January 31, 1997
Raleigh National Cemetery		501 Rock Quarry Rd.	Raleigh	Wake County	North Carolina	January 31, 1997
Salisbury National Cemetery		202 Government Rd.	Salisbury	Rowan County	North Carolina	April 12, 1999
Wilmington National Cemetery		2011 Market St.	Wilmington	New Hanover County	North Carolina	January 31, 1997
Philadelphia National Cemetery		Jct. of Haines St. and Limekiln Rd.	Philadelphia	Philadelphia County	Pennsylvania	July 24, 1997
Beaufort National Cemetery		1601 Boundary St.	Beaufort	Beaufort County	South Carolina	October 10, 1997
Florence National Cemetery		803 E. National Cemetery Rd.	Florence	Florence County	South Carolina	January 5, 1998
Chattanooga National Cemetery		1200 Bailey Ave.	Chattanooga	Hamilton County	Tennessee	September 16, 1996
Knoxville National Cemetery		939 Tyson St., NW	Knoxville	Knox County	Tennessee	September 12, 1996
Memphis National Cemetery		3568 Townes Ave.	Memphis	Shelby County	Tennessee	October 30, 1996
Nashville National Cemetery		1420 Gallatin Rd., S	Nashville	Davidson County	Tennessee	December 20, 1996
San Antonio National Cemetery		517 Paso Hondo St.	San Antonio	Bexar County	Texas	November 22, 1999
Alexandria National Cemetery		1450 Wilkes St.	Alexandria	Alexandria County	Virginia	March 2, 1995
City Point National Cemetery		Jct. of 10th Ave. and Davis St.	Hopewell	Hopewell (Independent City)	Virginia	August 10, 1995
Cold Harbor National Cemetery		Jct. VA 156 and 619, .5 mi. E	Mechanicsville	Hanover County	Virginia	August 10, 1995
Culpeper National Cemetery		305 U.S. Ave.	Culpeper	Culpeper County	Virginia	February 26, 1996
Danville National Cemetery		721 Lee St.	Danville	Danville (Independent City)	Virginia	April 7, 1995
Fort Harrison National Cemetery		8620 Varina Rd.	Richmond	Henrico County	Virginia	August 10, 1995
Glendale National Cemetery		Jct of VA 156 and VA 600, 1 mi. S	Providence Forge	Henrico County	Virginia	February 26, 1996
Hampton National Cemetery		Jct. of Cemetery Rd. and Marshall Ave.	Hampton	Hampton (Independent City)	Virginia	February 26, 1996
Richmond National Cemetery		1701 Williamsburg Rd.	Richmond	Henrico County	Virginia	October 26, 1995
Seven Pines National Cemetery		400 E. Williamsburg Rd.	Sandston	Henrico County	Virginia	October 26, 1995
Staunton National Cemetery		901 Richmond Ave.	Staunton	Staunton (Independent City)	Virginia	February 26, 1996
Winchester National Cemetery		401 National Ave.	Winchester	Winchester (Independent City)	Virginia	February 26, 1996
