= William W. McCammon =

William Wallace McCammon
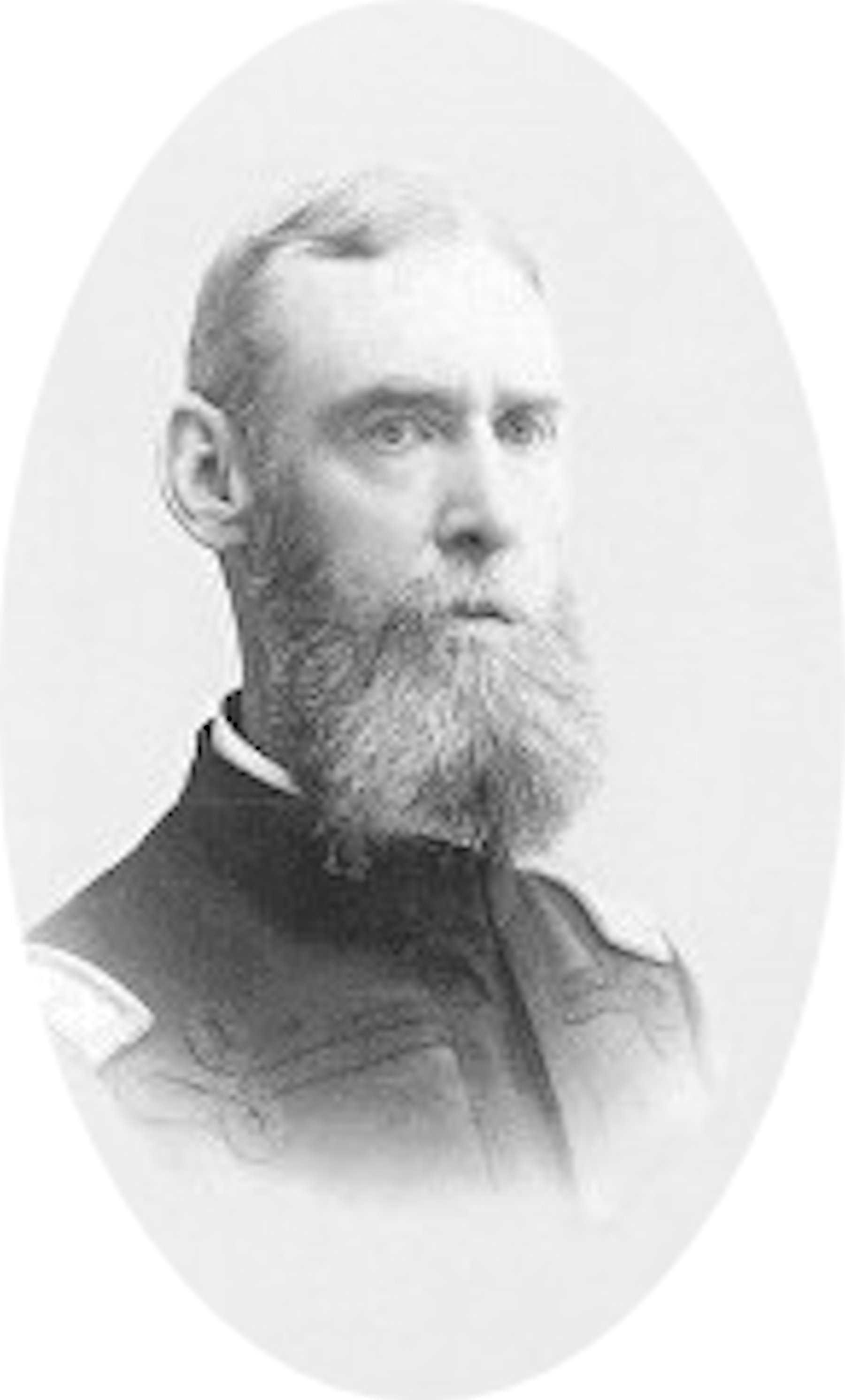
- Born: May 28, 1838; Shippensburg, Pennsylvania, US
- Died: March 27, 1903 (aged 64); Vancouver, Washington, US
- Burial place: Vancouver Barracks National Cemetery
- Military career
- Allegiance: United States of America; Union
- Branch: United States Navy; Union Army
- Service years: 1861 – 1866, 1867 – 1902
- Rank: Major
- Unit: 24th Missouri Infantry
- Conflicts: American Civil War
- Awards: Medal of Honor

William Wallace McCammon (May 28, 1838 – March 27, 1903) was a soldier in the Union Army who received the Medal of Honor for his actions during the American Civil War.

== Biography ==
He obtained the award for his service as 1st Lieutenant in Company E, 24th Missouri Infantry. He was Provost marshal of the company. During the fighting at Corinth, Mississippi, on October 3, 1862 (the Second Battle of Corinth), after great losses to his company, he voluntarily assumed command and continued to lead until the repulse and retreat of the enemy forces the next day. The award was not issued until July 9, 1896. He made a career in the army, rose to the rank of Major, and also served in the Spanish–American War. He was a companion of the Oregon Commandery of the Military Order of the Loyal Legion of the United States.

He died 19 1903 in Vancouver, Washington, and was buried at Vancouver Barracks National Cemetery.

== See also ==
- List of Medal of Honor recipients
- List of American Civil War Medal of Honor recipients: M–P
