= Danville National Cemetery =

Danville National Cemetery may refer to any of three United States National Cemeteries:

- Danville National Cemetery (Illinois), Danville, Illinois
- Danville National Cemetery (Kentucky), Danville, Kentucky
- Danville National Cemetery (Virginia), Danville, Virginia
