= Edmund Burke Whitman =

American Superintendent of National Cemeteries

Superintendent of National Cemeteries

Personal details
- Born: October 18, 1812 East Bridgewater, Massachusetts, U.S.
- Died: September 2, 1883 (aged 70) Cambridge, Massachusetts, U.S.
- Spouses: Nancy Russell (m. 1839; died 1855) Lucretia Clapp (m. 1858)
- Education: Harvard University (1838)

Edmund Burke Whitman (October 18, 1812 – September 2, 1883) was a quartermaster during the American Civil War. After the war he was Superintendent of National Cemeteries where he developed the principles for the selection of new United States National Cemetery sites in April 1869. His principles specified that a site should be of historical interest, and it should have convenient access for visitors. He and his team of United States Colored Troops (USCT) located more than 100,000 bodies of Union fallen in the Southern U.S. Most of the information was given to him by the African American inhabitants, as the white populace was often hostile to his efforts.

== Biography ==
He was born in East Bridgewater, Massachusetts, on October 18, 1812, to Alfred Whitman and Betsey Robbins. He attended Phillips Exeter Academy and graduated from Harvard University in 1838.

On August 30, 1839, he married Nancy Russell in Kingston, Massachusetts. They had four children: Amelia Whitman (1840–?), Alfred Whitman (1841–?), Russell Whitman (1844–?), and James Whitman (1847–?). Nancy died around 1854 or 1855. In 1855 the family moved to Lawrence, Kansas.

He married Lucretia Clapp on October 25, 1858. They had a son: Edmund Whitman (c. 1860–?). In 1877 the family moved to Cambridge, Massachusetts.

He died on September 2, 1883, in Cambridge, Massachusetts.

Whitman is prominently featured in the 2008 historical book This Republic of Suffering: Death and the American Civil War by Drew Gilpin Faust.
