= South Florida National Cemetery =

Veterans cemetery in Palm Beach County, Florida

- Interactive map of South Florida National Cemetery

Details
- Established: 2015
- Location: 6501 South State Road; Lake Worth Beach, Florida
- Country: United States
- Coordinates: 26°34′44″N 80°12′32″W
- Type: United States National Cemetery
- Owned by: U.S. Department of Veterans Affairs
- Size: 313 acres (127 ha)
- No. of graves: >33,000
- Website: Official
- Find a Grave: South Florida National Cemetery

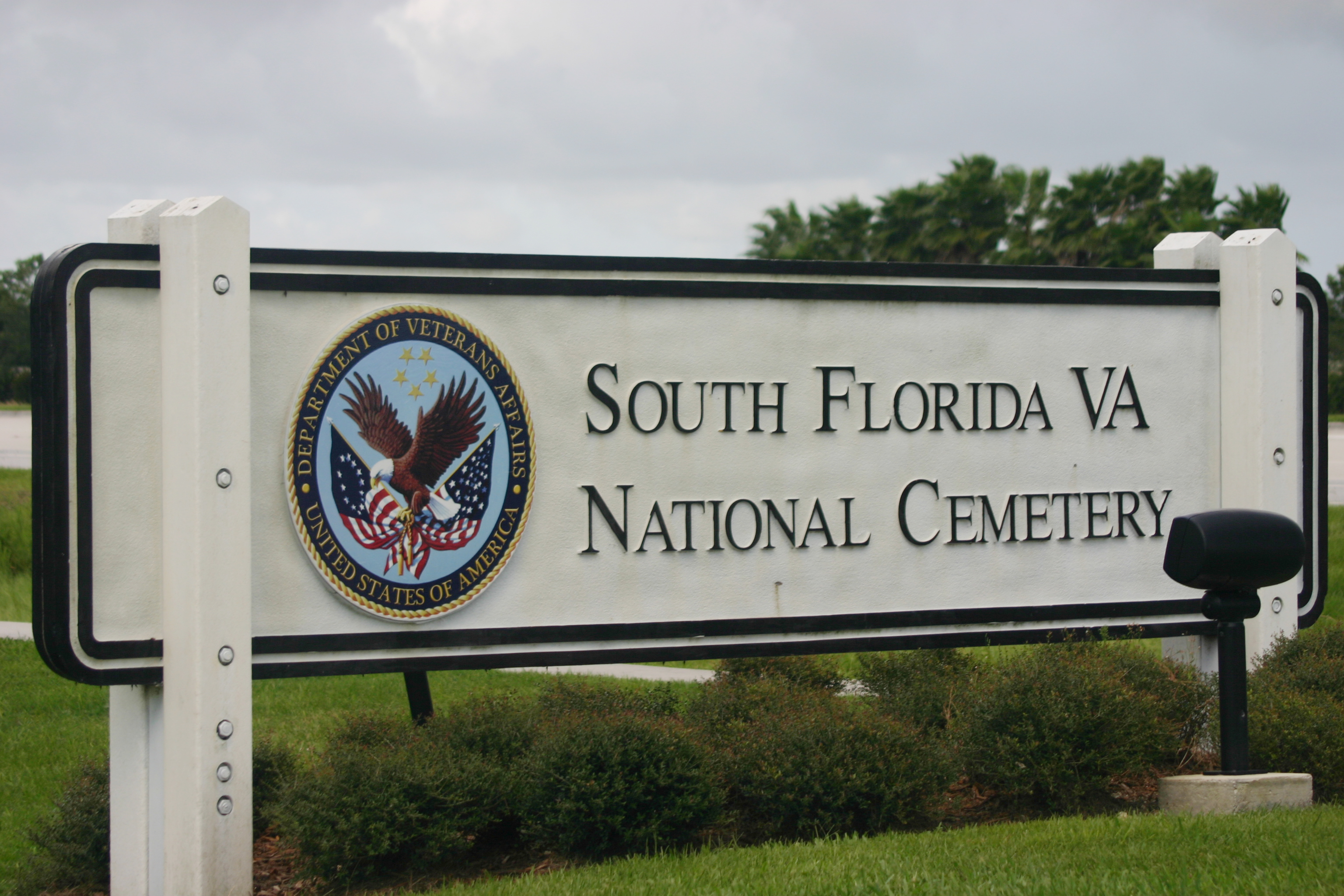
Sign in front of the cemetery.

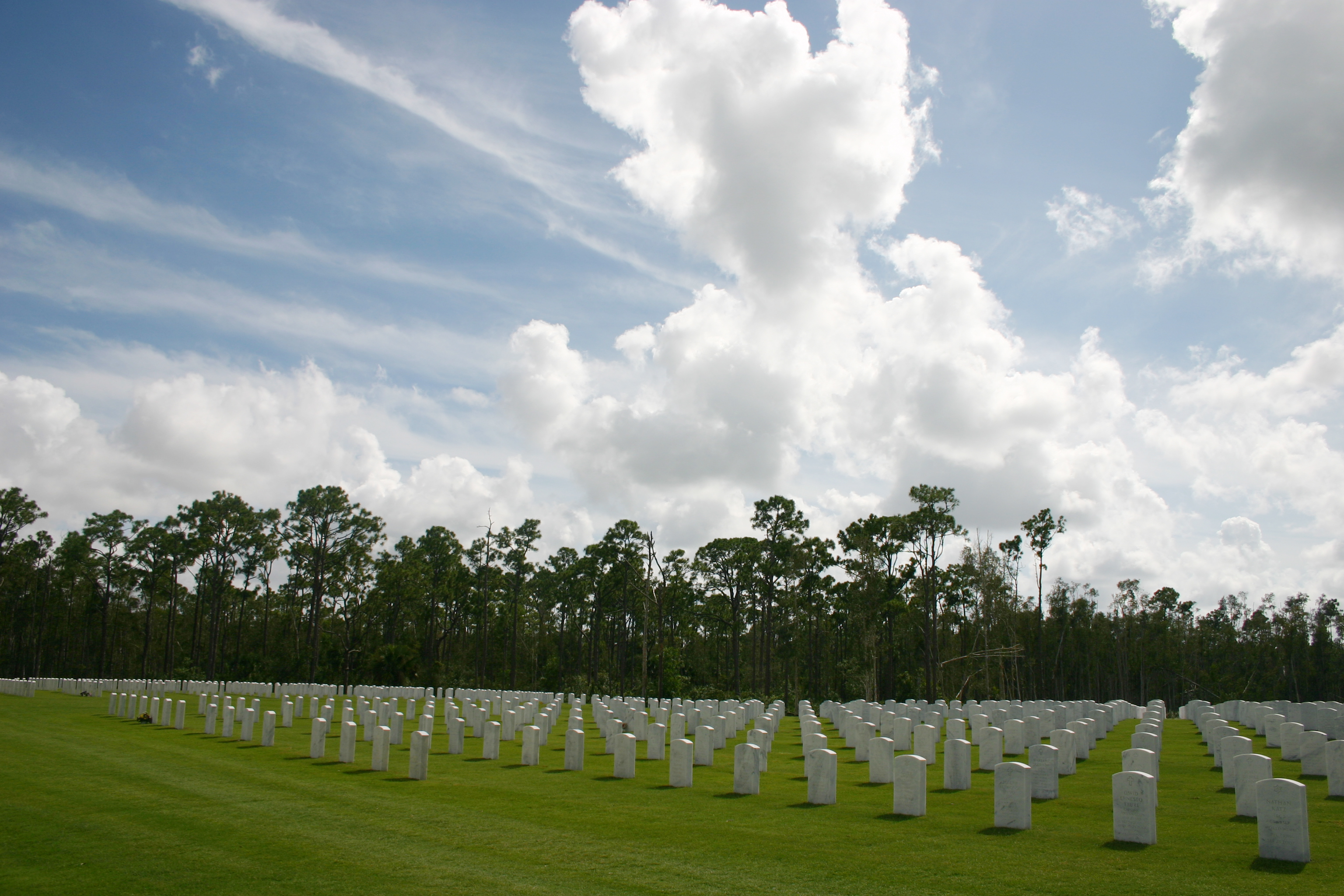
Headstones, facing west.

South Florida National Cemetery is a United States National Cemetery, located in western Lake Worth Beach, Florida. It is maintained by the United States Department of Veterans Affairs, and it is also one of the newest national cemeteries in the United States, when it opened to the public on April 16, 2007, although the official dedication of the cemetery was on March 9, 2008. The federal approval for the 313-acre (127 ha) cemetery was in October 2000.

== Notable burials ==
- Joe Astroth (1922–2013) Major League Baseball Player
- Johnny Gray (1926–2014) Major League Baseball Player
- Claude R. Kirk Jr. (1926–2011) 36th Governor of Florida
- John Orsino (1938–2016) Professional Baseball Player
- Hank Rosenstein (1920–2010) Professional Basketball Player
- Leo C. Zeferetti (1927–2018) US Congressman
