= Kerrville National Cemetery =

Veterans cemetery in Kerr County, Texas

Coordinates: 30°00′51″N 99°06′36″W

Details
- Established: 1923
- Location: Kerrville, Texas
- Country: United States
- Type: United States National Cemetery (closed to new interments)
- Owned by: U.S. Department of Veterans Affairs
- Size: 1.7 acres (0.69 ha)
- No. of graves: 515
- Website: Official
- Find a Grave: Kerrville National Cemetery

Kerrville National Cemetery is a United States National Cemetery located in the city of Kerrville, in Kerr County, Texas. Administered by the United States Department of Veterans Affairs, it encompasses 1.7 acres (0.69 ha), and as 2014 had 515 interments. It is maintained by Fort Sam Houston National Cemetery in San Antonio, Texas and is now closed to new interments.

== History ==
In 1923, the trustees of Brown Cemetery gave permission for military veterans who had no family or burial preparations to be interred in a section of the cemetery. In 1932, the section of land was sold to the American Legion and then donated to the Veteran's Administration in 1943. It became a National Cemetery in 1973.
