= Fort Jackson National Cemetery =

Veterans cemetery in Richland County, South Carolina

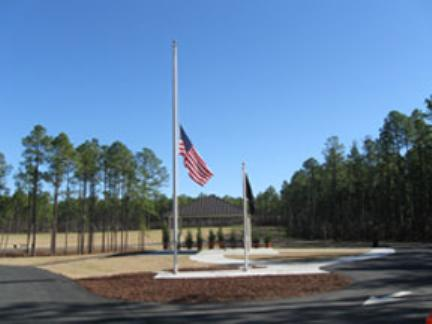
- Fort Jackson National Cemetery
- Interactive map of Fort Jackson National Cemetery

Details
- Location: 4170 Percival Rd., Columbia, South Carolina
- Coordinates: 34°05′27″N 80°51′00″W
- Owned by: Department of Veterans Affairs
- Size: 585 acres (237 ha)
- No. of interments: >9,000
- Find a Grave: Fort Jackson National Cemetery

Fort Jackson National Cemetery is a United States National Cemetery located northeast of Columbia, South Carolina. It encompasses 585 acres (237 ha) acquired from Fort Jackson, a United States Army Basic Training facility, and was dedicated on October 26, 2008.

== History ==
The Veterans Administration was authorized to establish six new burial sites by the National Cemetery Act of 2003. Areas not served by an existing National Cemetery and containing at least 170,000 veteran residents included Bakersfield, California; Birmingham, Alabama; Jacksonville, Florida; Sarasota County, Florida; southeastern Pennsylvania and Columbia- Greenville, South Carolina.

The Fort Jackson National Cemetery joins two existing civil war cemeteries in South Carolina, Florence National Cemetery and Beaufort National Cemetery.

== Site Status ==
Initial construction began in May, 2008 and created a 15-acre (6.1 ha) burial area with temporary facilities. Stage 1A was completed in December, 2008, and the grounds were opened for burials in January, 2009. On July 9, 2009, the Department of Veterans Affairs announced a $10 million contract to develop stage 1B at the cemetery, with construction starting immediately on an entrance, roadways within the 50-acre (20 ha) section, permanent buildings for administration and maintenance, a public information center and shelters for services during inclement weather. Infrastructure consisting of drainage, fencing, landscaping, irrigation and utilities is also being built. The section under development will provide 5,000 gravesites, including 4,200 pre-placed crypts, 5,000 in-ground cremation sites and 2,000 columbarium niches. Stage 1 is expected to be complete at the end of 2010 or early 2011.
