= United States National Cemetery System =

Cemeteries for veterans in the United States

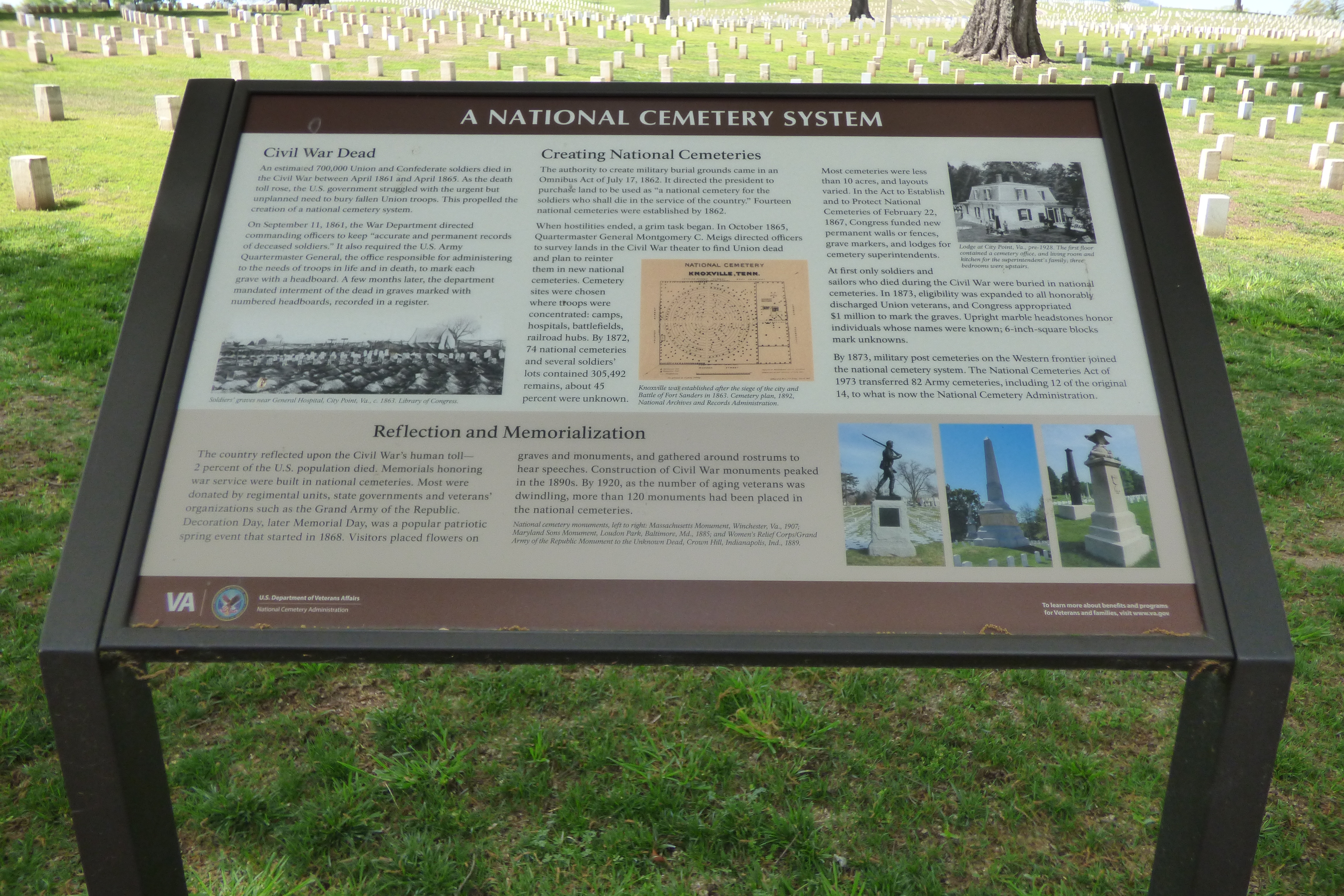
A plaque at Chattanooga National Cemetery that explains the history of the National Cemetery System

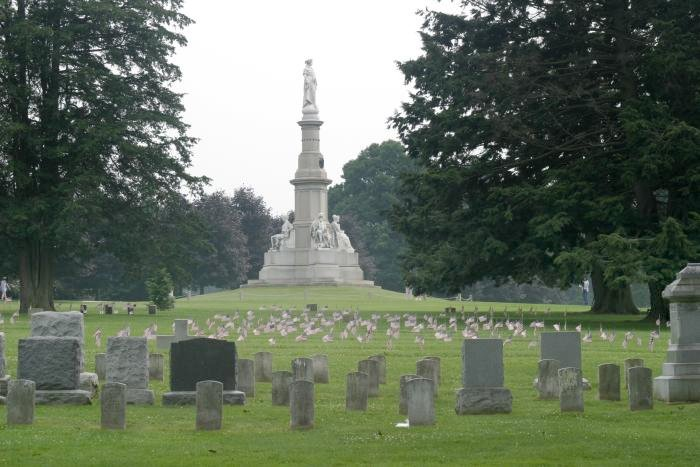
Gettysburg National Cemetery, Pennsylvania

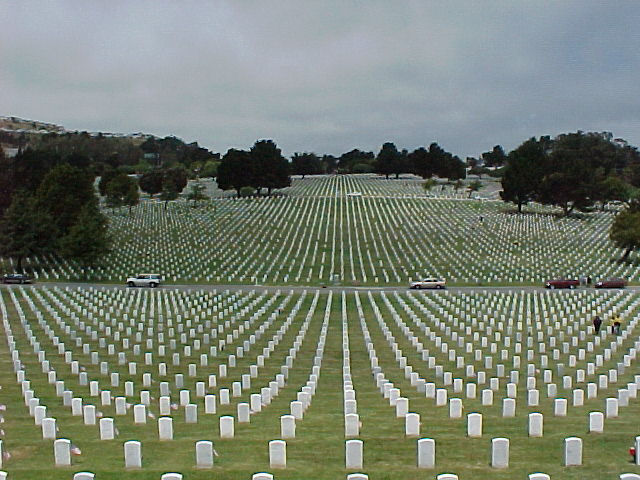
Golden Gate National Cemetery, California

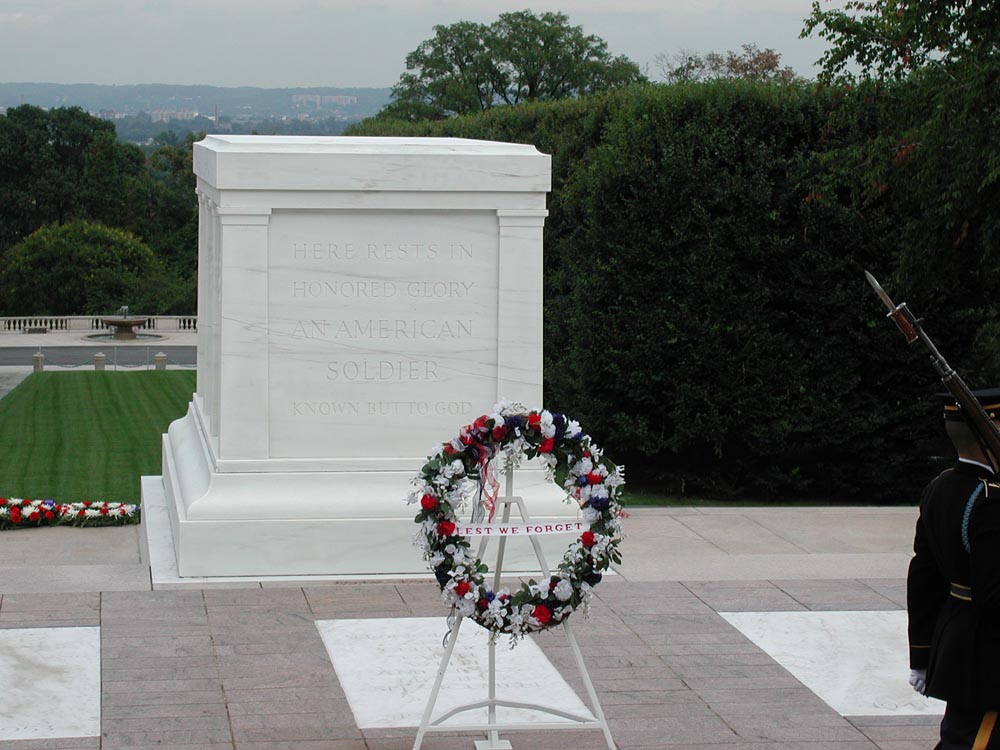
Arlington National Cemetery, Virginia

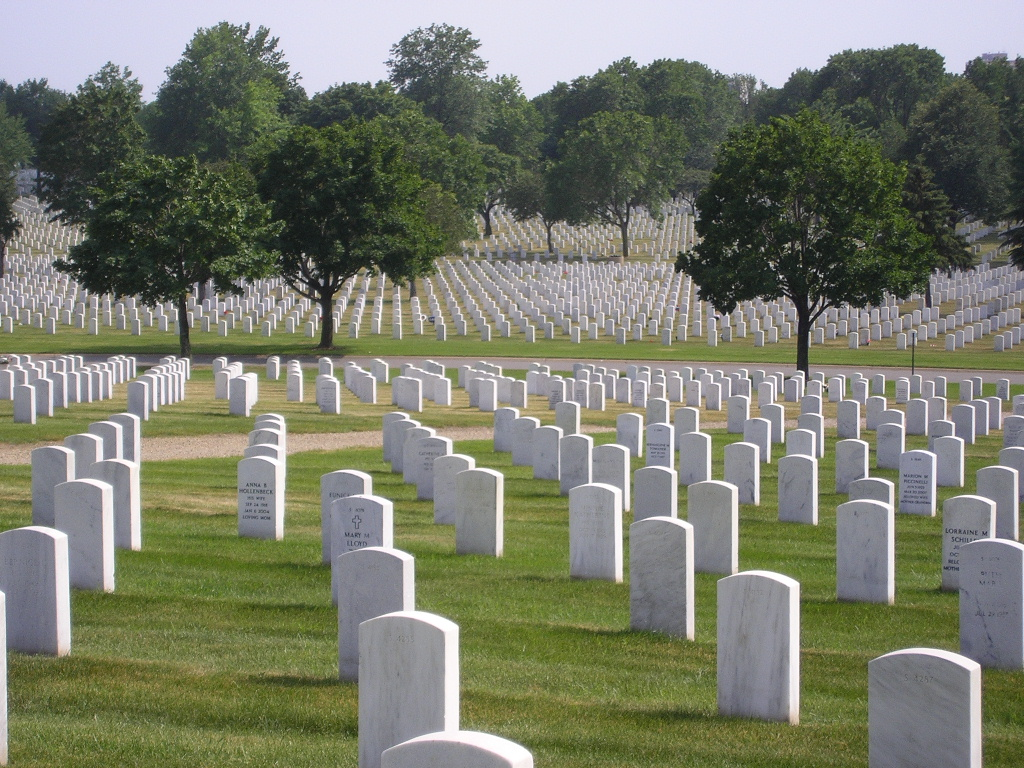
Fort Snelling National Cemetery, Minnesota

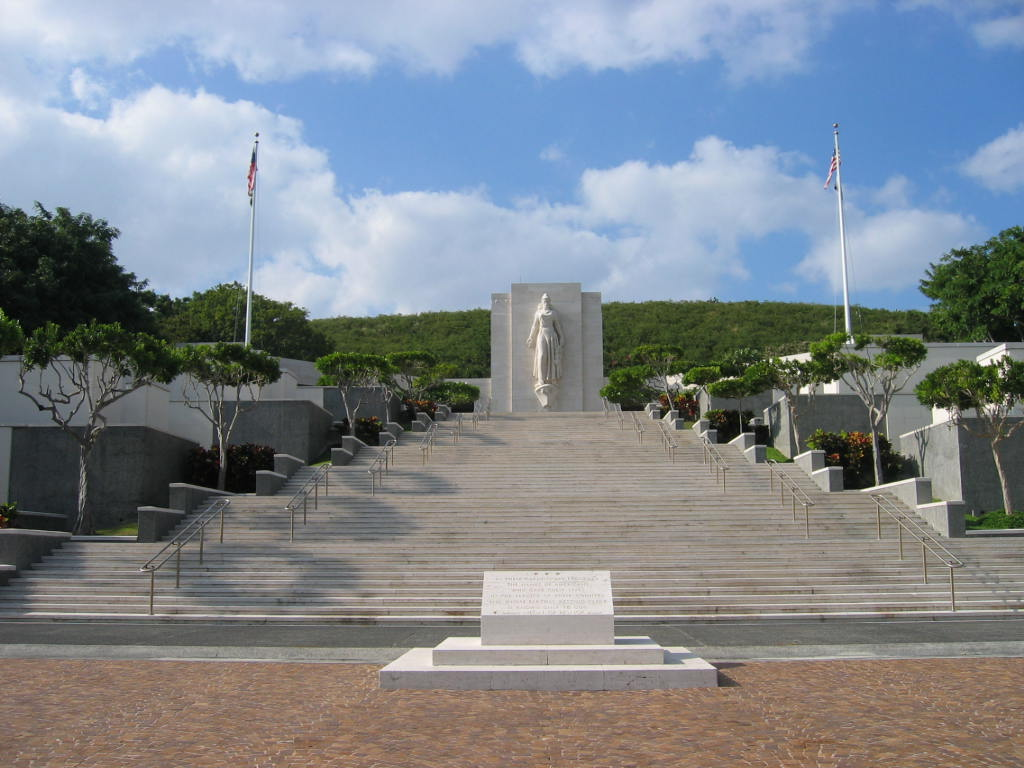
National Memorial Cemetery of the Pacific, Hawaii

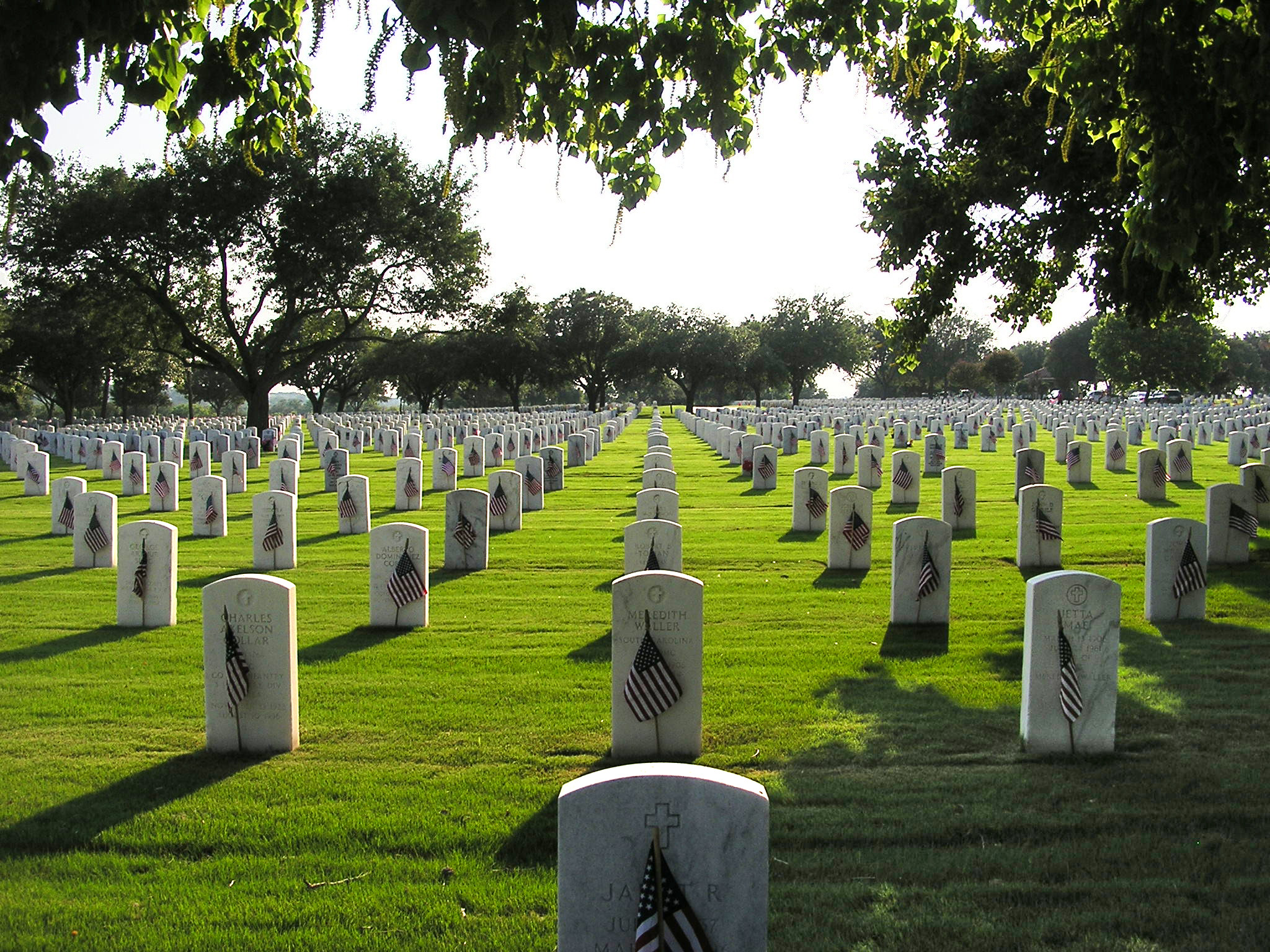
Fort Sam Houston National Cemetery. Memorial Day 2010

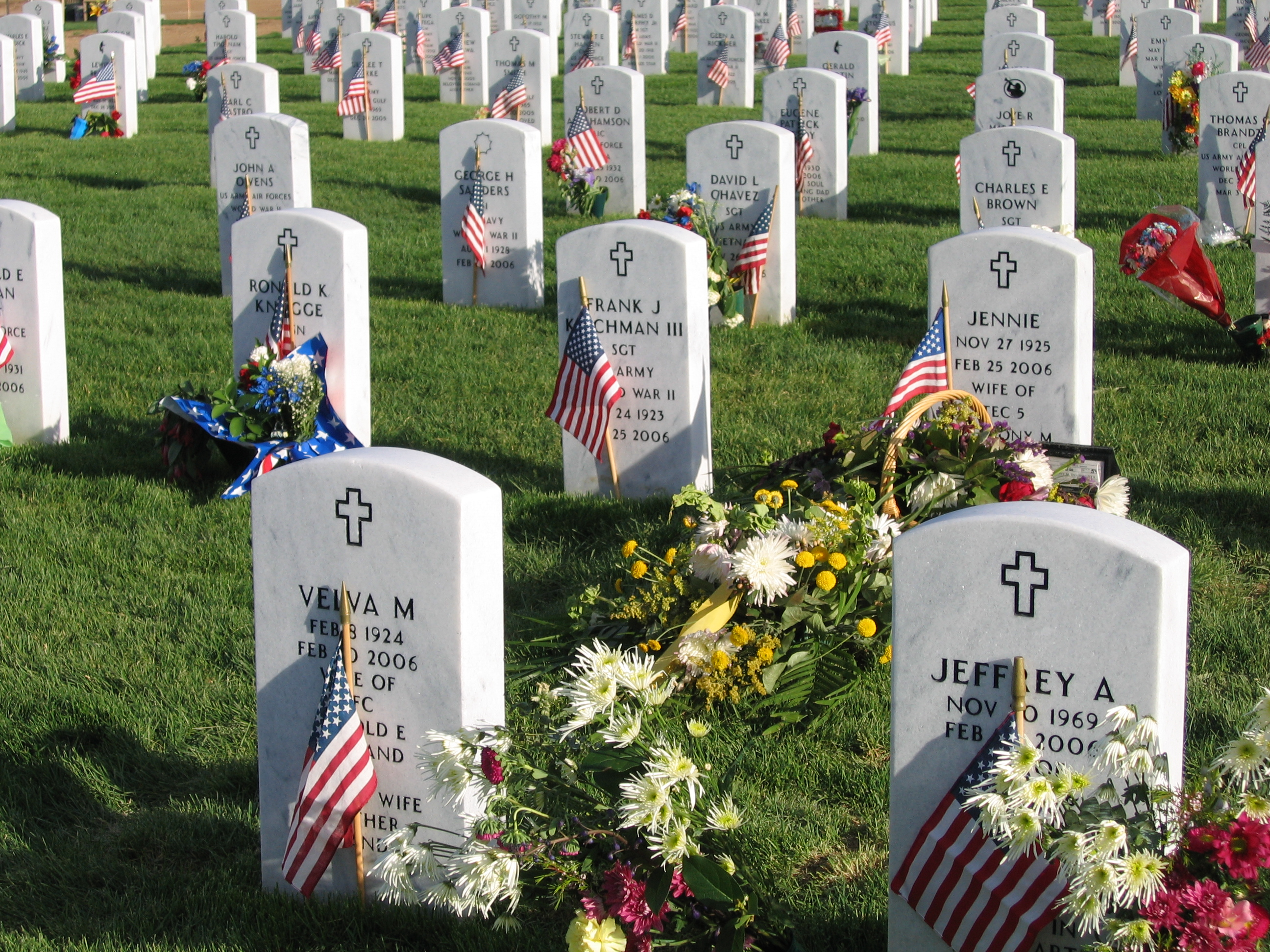
Gravesites at Fort Logan National Cemetery during Memorial Day 2006

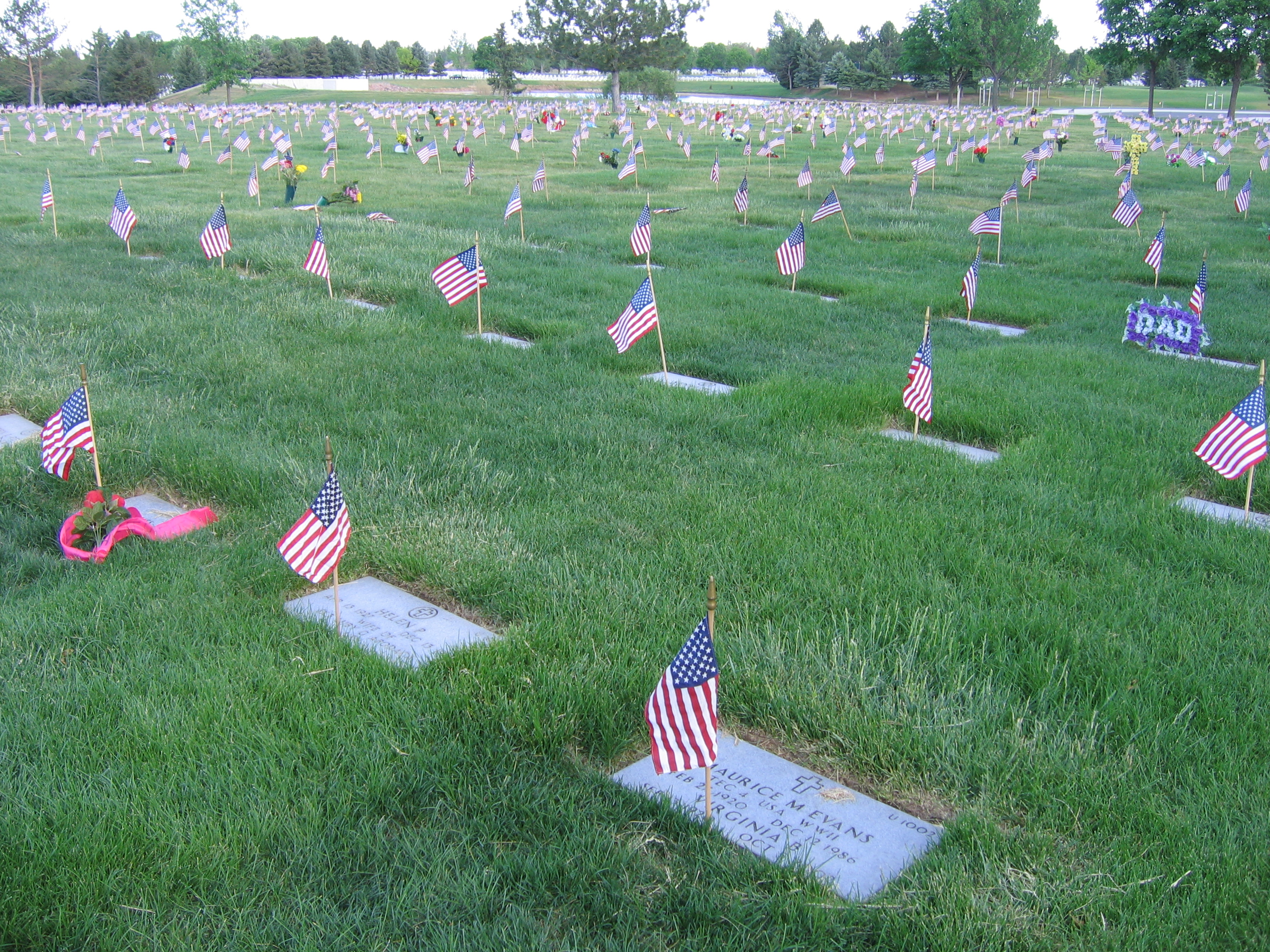
Flags flying at Fort Logan National Cemetery during Memorial Day 2006. The cemetery has flat markers, a practice which is used extensively in the new fields at this cemetery.

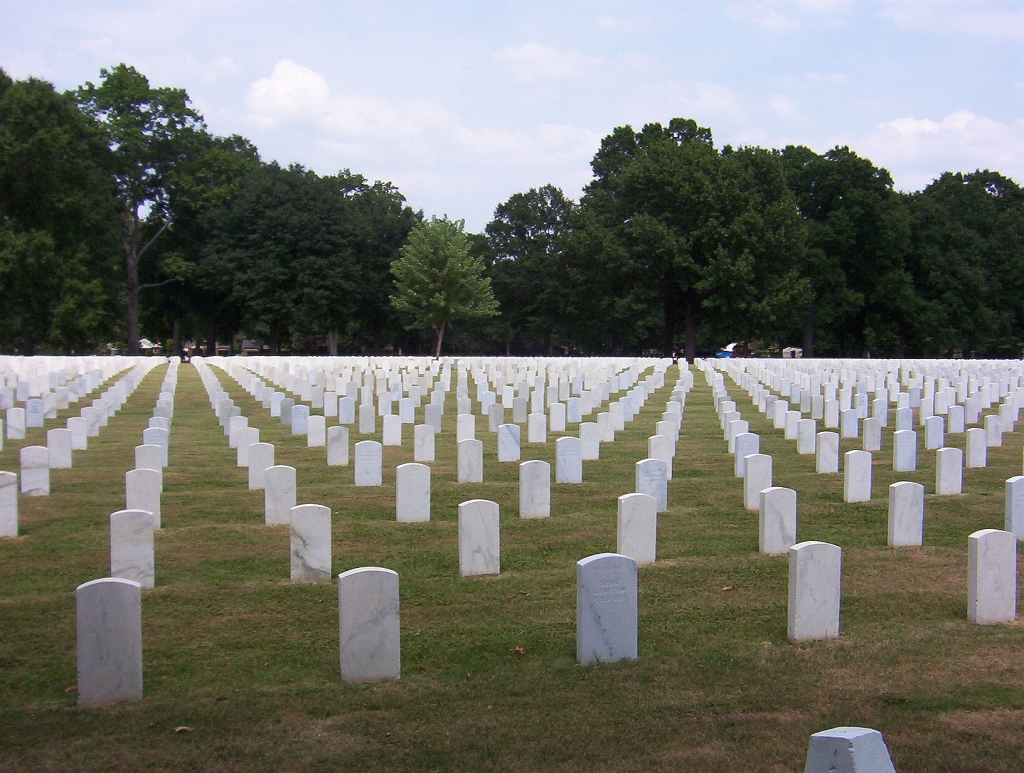
Memphis National Cemetery, Tennessee

Creation of national cemeteries

The United States National Cemetery System is a system of 173 military cemeteries in the United States and its territories. The authority to create military burial places came during the American Civil War, in an act passed by the U.S. Congress on July 17, 1862. By the end of 1862, 12 national cemeteries had been established. Two of the nation's most iconic military cemeteries, Arlington National Cemetery which is under the jurisdiction of the Department of the Army, and Gettysburg National Cemetery, under the jurisdiction of the National Park Service, were established in 1864 and 1863, respectively.

== National Cemetery Administration ==
The National Cemetery Administration of the United States Department of Veterans Affairs (VA) maintains 157 national cemeteries as well as the Nationwide Gravesite Locator, which can be used to find burial locations of American military Veterans through their searchable website. The Department of the Army maintains two national cemeteries, Arlington National Cemetery and United States Soldiers' and Airmen's Home National Cemetery. The National Park Service (NPS) maintains 14 national cemeteries associated with historic sites and battlefields.

The American Battle Monuments Commission, an independent agency of the executive branch, established by Congress in 1923, maintains 26 American military cemeteries and other memorials outside the United States.

== History ==
Twelve national cemeteries were established in 1862. A total of 34 were established during the Civil War from 1861 to 1865. Additional cemeteries were set up after the United States Civil War by Edmund Burke Whitman. Congress passed additional laws to establish and protect national cemeteries in 1867. The National Cemetery Administration lists a total of 73 Civil War-Era National Cemeteries from 1861 to 1868.

Final military honors are provided for qualified Veterans by volunteer veteran or National Guard details known as Memorial Honor Details (MHD), upon application by family members through their choice of mortuary handling the deceased.

== List of United States national cemeteries ==
Cemetery	City	State	Agency	Founded (Note: The year listed is the official date of establishment listed by the VA. This may differ from the year of the first burial, the oldest remains, the year the land was acquired, etc. Many post cemeteries have been given national cemetery status as late as 2020, which is considerably later than the original cemetery. For example, Vancouver Barracks post cemetery was established in 1849 and became a national cemetery in 2020—one of 11 cemeteries transferred from the Army to NCA in 2019–2020 per Exec. Order No. 13781, 2017.)
Abraham Lincoln National Cemetery	Elwood	Illinois	VA	1999
Acadia National Cemetery	Jonesboro	Maine	VA	2020
Alabama National Cemetery	Montevallo	Alabama	VA	2009
Alexandria National Cemetery (Louisiana)	Pineville	Louisiana	VA	1867
Alexandria National Cemetery (Virginia)	Alexandria	Virginia	VA	1862
Alton National Cemetery	Alton	Illinois	VA	1948
Andersonville National Cemetery	Andersonville	Georgia	NPS	1865
Andrew Johnson National Cemetery	Greeneville	Tennessee	NPS	1906
Annapolis National Cemetery	Annapolis	Maryland	VA	1862
Antietam National Cemetery	Sharpsburg	Maryland	NPS	1865
Arlington National Cemetery	Arlington	Virginia	Army	1864
Bakersfield National Cemetery	Bakersfield	California	VA	2009
Ball's Bluff National Cemetery	Leesburg	Virginia	VA	1865
Baltimore National Cemetery	Baltimore	Maryland	VA	1936
Barrancas National Cemetery	Pensacola	Florida	VA	1868
Bath National Cemetery	Bath	New York	VA	1879
Baton Rouge National Cemetery	Baton Rouge	Louisiana	VA	1867
Battleground National Cemetery	Washington	D.C.	NPS	1864
Bay Pines National Cemetery	Bay Pines	Florida	VA	1933
Beaufort National Cemetery	Beaufort	South Carolina	VA	1863
Beverly National Cemetery	Beverly	New Jersey	VA	1864
Biloxi National Cemetery	Biloxi	Mississippi	VA	1934
Black Hills National Cemetery	Sturgis	South Dakota	VA	1948
Calverton National Cemetery	Calverton	New York	VA	1976
Camp Butler National Cemetery	Springfield	Illinois	VA	1862
Camp Nelson National Cemetery	Nicholasville	Kentucky	VA	1866
Cape Canaveral National Cemetery	Scottsmoor	Florida	VA	2015
Cave Hill National Cemetery	Louisville	Kentucky	VA	1863
Chalmette National Cemetery	Chalmette	Louisiana	NPS	1864
Chattanooga National Cemetery	Chattanooga	Tennessee	VA	1863
Cheyenne National Cemetery	Cheyenne	Wyoming	VA	2020
City Point National Cemetery	Hopewell	Virginia	VA	1866
Cold Harbor National Cemetery	Mechanicsville	Virginia	VA	1866
Corinth National Cemetery	Corinth	Mississippi	VA	1866
Crown Hill National Cemetery	Indianapolis	Indiana	VA	1866
Culpeper National Cemetery	Culpeper	Virginia	VA	1867
Custer National Cemetery	Crow Agency	Montana	NPS	1879
Cypress Hills National Cemetery	Brooklyn	New York	VA	1862
Dallas-Fort Worth National Cemetery	Dallas	Texas	VA	2000
Danville National Cemetery (Illinois)	Danville	Illinois	VA	1898
Danville National Cemetery (Kentucky)	Danville	Kentucky	VA	1862
Danville National Cemetery (Virginia)	Danville	Virginia	VA	1867
Dayton National Cemetery	Dayton	Ohio	VA	1867
Eagle Point National Cemetery	Eagle Point	Oregon	VA	1952
Fargo National Cemetery	Harwood	North Dakota	VA	2019
Fayetteville National Cemetery	Fayetteville	Arkansas	VA	1867
Finn's Point National Cemetery	Salem	New Jersey	VA	1875
Florence National Cemetery	Florence	South Carolina	VA	1865
Florida National Cemetery	Bushnell	Florida	VA	1987
Fort Bayard National Cemetery	Bayard	New Mexico	VA	1922
Fort Bliss National Cemetery	Fort Bliss	Texas	VA	1939
Fort Custer National Cemetery	Augusta	Michigan	VA	1982
Fort Donelson National Cemetery	Dover	Tennessee	NPS	1867
Fort Gibson National Cemetery	Fort Gibson	Oklahoma	VA	1868
Fort Harrison National Cemetery	Richmond	Virginia	VA	1866
Fort Jackson National Cemetery	Columbia	South Carolina	VA	2009
Fort Leavenworth National Cemetery	Fort Leavenworth	Kansas	VA	1862
Fort Logan National Cemetery	Denver	Colorado	VA	1950
Fort Lyon National Cemetery	Las Animas	Colorado	VA	1867
Fort McPherson National Cemetery	Maxwell	Nebraska	VA	1873
Fort Meade National Cemetery	Sturgis	South Dakota	VA	1878
Fort Mitchell National Cemetery	Fort Mitchell	Alabama	VA	1987
Fort Richardson National Cemetery	Fort Richardson	Alaska	VA	1984
Fort Rosecrans National Cemetery	San Diego	California	VA	1934
Fort Sam Houston National Cemetery	San Antonio	Texas	VA	1937
Fort Scott National Cemetery	Fort Scott	Kansas	VA	1862
Fort Sheridan National Cemetery	Fort Sheridan	Illinois	VA	2019
Fort Sill National Cemetery	Elgin	Oklahoma	VA	2001
Fort Smith National Cemetery	Fort Smith	Arkansas	VA	1867
Fort Snelling National Cemetery	Minneapolis	Minnesota	VA	1939
Fort Stevens National Cemetery	Hammond	Oregon	VA	2020
Fredericksburg National Cemetery	Fredericksburg	Virginia	NPS	1865
Georgia National Cemetery	Canton	Georgia	VA	2006
Gerald B. H. Solomon Saratoga National Cemetery	Schuylerville	New York	VA	1999
Gettysburg National Cemetery	Gettysburg	Pennsylvania	NPS	1863
Glendale National Cemetery	Richmond	Virginia	VA	1866
Golden Gate National Cemetery	San Bruno	California	VA	1938
Grafton National Cemetery	Grafton	West Virginia	VA	1867
Great Lakes National Cemetery	Holly	Michigan	VA	2005
Hampton National Cemetery	Hampton	Virginia	VA	1866
Hampton VAMC National Cemetery	Hampton	Virginia	VA	1898
Hot Springs National Cemetery	Hot Springs	South Dakota	VA	1930
Houston National Cemetery	Houston	Texas	VA	1963
Indiantown Gap National Cemetery	Annville	Pennsylvania	VA	1976
Jacksonville National Cemetery	Jacksonville	Florida	VA	2009
Jefferson Barracks National Cemetery	St. Louis	Missouri	VA	1863
Jefferson City National Cemetery	Jefferson City	Missouri	VA	1867
Keokuk National Cemetery	Keokuk	Iowa	VA	1862
Kerrville National Cemetery	Kerrville	Texas	VA	1943
Knoxville National Cemetery	Knoxville	Tennessee	VA	1863
Leavenworth National Cemetery	Leavenworth	Kansas	VA	1930
Lebanon National Cemetery	Lebanon	Kentucky	VA	1867
Lexington National Cemetery	Lexington	Kentucky	VA	1863
Little Rock National Cemetery	Little Rock	Arkansas	VA	1868
Long Island National Cemetery	Farmingdale	New York	VA	1936
Los Angeles National Cemetery	Los Angeles	California	VA	1930
Loudon Park National Cemetery	Baltimore	Maryland	VA	1862
Louisiana National Cemetery	Zachary	Louisiana	VA	2012
Marietta National Cemetery	Marietta	Georgia	VA	1866
Marion National Cemetery	Marion	Indiana	VA	1930
Massachusetts National Cemetery	Bourne	Massachusetts	VA	1976
Memphis National Cemetery	Memphis	Tennessee	VA	1867
Mill Springs National Cemetery	Nancy	Kentucky	VA	1862
Miramar National Cemetery	San Diego	California	VA	2010
Mobile National Cemetery	Mobile	Alabama	VA	1865
Morovis National Cemetery	Morovis	Puerto Rico	VA	2020
Mound City National Cemetery	Mound City	Illinois	VA	1864
Mountain Home National Cemetery	Mountain Home	Tennessee	VA	1903
Nashville National Cemetery	Madison	Tennessee	VA	1866
Natchez National Cemetery	Natchez	Mississippi	VA	1866
National Cemetery of the Alleghenies	Cecil Township	Pennsylvania	VA	2005
National Memorial Cemetery of Arizona	Phoenix	Arizona	VA	1989
National Memorial Cemetery of the Pacific	Honolulu	Hawaii	VA	1948
New Albany National Cemetery	New Albany	Indiana	VA	1862
New Bern National Cemetery	New Bern	North Carolina	VA	1867
Northwoods National Cemetery	Harshaw	Wisconsin	VA	2020
Ohio Western Reserve National Cemetery	Rittman	Ohio	VA	2000
Omaha National Cemetery	Omaha	Nebraska	VA	2016
Philadelphia National Cemetery	Philadelphia	Pennsylvania	VA	1885
Pikes Peak National Cemetery	Colorado Springs	Colorado	VA	2018
Poplar Grove National Cemetery	Petersburg	Virginia	NPS	1866
Port Hudson National Cemetery	Zachary	Louisiana	VA	1866
Prescott National Cemetery	Prescott	Arizona	VA	1931
Puerto Rico National Cemetery	Bayamón	Puerto Rico	VA	1948
Quantico National Cemetery	Triangle	Virginia	VA	1977
Quincy National Cemetery	Quincy	Illinois	VA	1899
Raleigh National Cemetery	Raleigh	North Carolina	VA	1865
Richmond National Cemetery	Richmond	Virginia	VA	1866
Riverside National Cemetery	Riverside	California	VA	1976
Rock Island National Cemetery	Rock Island	Illinois	VA	1863
Roseburg National Cemetery	Roseburg	Oregon	VA	1932
Sacramento Valley National Cemetery	Dixon	California	VA	2006
Salisbury National Cemetery	Salisbury	North Carolina	VA	1865
San Antonio National Cemetery	San Antonio	Texas	VA	1867
San Francisco National Cemetery	San Francisco	California	VA	1884
San Joaquin Valley National Cemetery	Gustine	California	VA	1992
Santa Fe National Cemetery	Santa Fe	New Mexico	VA	1875
Sarasota National Cemetery	Sarasota	Florida	VA	2009
Seven Pines National Cemetery	Sandston	Virginia	VA	1866
Shiloh National Cemetery	Shiloh	Tennessee	NPS	1867
Sitka National Cemetery	Sitka	Alaska	VA	1924
Snake River Canyon National Cemetery	Buhl	Idaho	VA	2020
South Florida National Cemetery	Lake Worth Beach	Florida	VA	2007
Springfield National Cemetery	Springfield	Missouri	VA	1867
Saint Augustine National Cemetery	St. Augustine	Florida	VA	1881
Staunton National Cemetery	Staunton	Virginia	VA	1866
Stones River National Cemetery	Murfreesboro	Tennessee	NPS	1864
Tahoma National Cemetery	Kent	Washington	VA	1997
Tallahassee National Cemetery	Tallahassee	Florida	VA	2015
Togus National Cemetery	Chelsea	Maine	VA	1936
US Soldiers' & Airmen's Home National Cemetery	Washington	D.C.	Army	1862
Vancouver Barracks National Cemetery	Vancouver	Washington	VA	2020
Vicksburg National Cemetery	Vicksburg	Mississippi	NPS	1866
Washington Crossing National Cemetery	Newtown	Pennsylvania	VA	2009
Western New York National Cemetery	Pembroke	New York	VA	2020
West Virginia National Cemetery	Grafton	West Virginia	VA	1987
Willamette National Cemetery	Portland	Oregon	VA	1950
Wilmington National Cemetery	Wilmington	North Carolina	VA	1867
Winchester National Cemetery	Winchester	Virginia	VA	1866
Wood National Cemetery	Milwaukee	Wisconsin	VA	1871
Woodlawn National Cemetery	Elmira	New York	VA	1874
Yellowstone National Cemetery	Laurel	Montana	VA	2014
Yorktown National Cemetery	Yorktown	Virginia	NPS	1866
Zachary Taylor National Cemetery	Louisville	Kentucky	VA	1928

== See also ==
- Fort Leavenworth Military Prison Cemetery
- USVA emblems for headstones and markers
- List of military tombstone abbreviations
