= Fargo National Cemetery =

Veterans cemetery in Cass County, North Dakota

- Interactive map of Fargo National Cemetery

Details
- Established: 2016
- Location: Harwood, North Dakota
- Country: United States
- Coordinates: 46°56′09″N 96°56′04″W
- Type: United States National Cemetery
- Size: 4.8 acres (1.9 ha)
- Website: www.cem.va.gov/cems/nchp/fargo.asp
- Find a Grave: Fargo National Cemetery

Fargo National Cemetery is a 4.8 acre United States Department of Veterans Affairs (VA) national cemetery located in Raymond Township, Cass County, North Dakota (with the street address in Harwood, North Dakota). The cemetery serves as the burial needs of more than 30,000 veterans, their spouses, and eligible family members.

== History and location ==
In June 2016, the VA purchased the property at 8709 40th Avenue N, County Road 20, Harwood, North Dakota, for $93,445 A contract to build the cemetery was awarded in July 2017.

This is the first national cemetery built in North Dakota and is part of the VA National Cemetery Administration's Rural Initiative, which aims to provide access to VA burial benefits for veterans residing in rural areas who have not previously had reasonable access to a national or state veterans' cemetery.

The cemetery was dedicated on September 7, 2019 and the first interment took place on October 15, 2019. The first phase of cemetery development offers more than 3,000 casket and cremation spaces to accommodate burials for the next 10 years. The cemetery provides burials for caskets, in-ground and columbarium burials for cremations, as well as a memorial wall for remains that were unrecoverable or unidentified, buried at sea, donated to science, or cremated.

Fargo National Cemetery is the second Rural Initiative cemetery in the nation and the first to be built by the VA's National Cemetery Administration.
