= Fort Sheridan National Cemetery =

Historic veterans cemetery in Lake County, Illinois

- Interactive map of Fort Sheridan National Cemetery

Details
- Established: 1889
- Location: Fort Sheridan, Lake County, Illinois
- Country: United States
- Coordinates: 42°13′28″N 87°49′15″W, Elevation: 690 feet (210 m)
- Type: United States National Cemetery
- Owned by: National Cemetery Administration
- No. of graves: 2,354 (2025)
- Website: Fort Sheridan National Cemetery - National Cemetery Administration
- Find a Grave: Fort Sheridan National Cemetery
- Fort Sheridan National Cemetery
- Location within Illinois
- Coordinates: 42°13′28″N 87°49′15″W

Fort Sheridan National Cemetery was established in 1889 on the grounds of Fort Sheridan, a United States Army installation that had been established two years earlier, in 1887, in Lake County, Illinois and remained an active U.S. Army installation until 1993.

In January 1989, as part of the Base Realignment and Closure (BRAC) process, the Secretary of Defense approved a recommendation to close the fort. Following the closure, a 1997 agreement transferred approximately 250 acres of the former post to the Lake County Forest Preserve District. One condition of this transfer was that the District would provide perpetual care and maintenance of Fort Sheridan National Cemetery.

In December 2019, administrative responsibility for the cemetery was officially transferred from the Department of the Army to the National Cemetery Administration (NCA), part of the United States National Cemetery System and would be administered by the Abraham Lincoln National Cemetery.

Veterans interred at Fort Sheridan National Cemetery span U.S. military history from the American Civil War through modern conflicts. The cemetery also contains the graves of several World War II-era German prisoners of war who were held at Fort Sheridan and the nearby Camp Grant.

As of 2025, Fort Sheridan National Cemetery contains 2,354 interments.
