= Bakersfield National Cemetery =

Veterans cemetery in Kern County, California

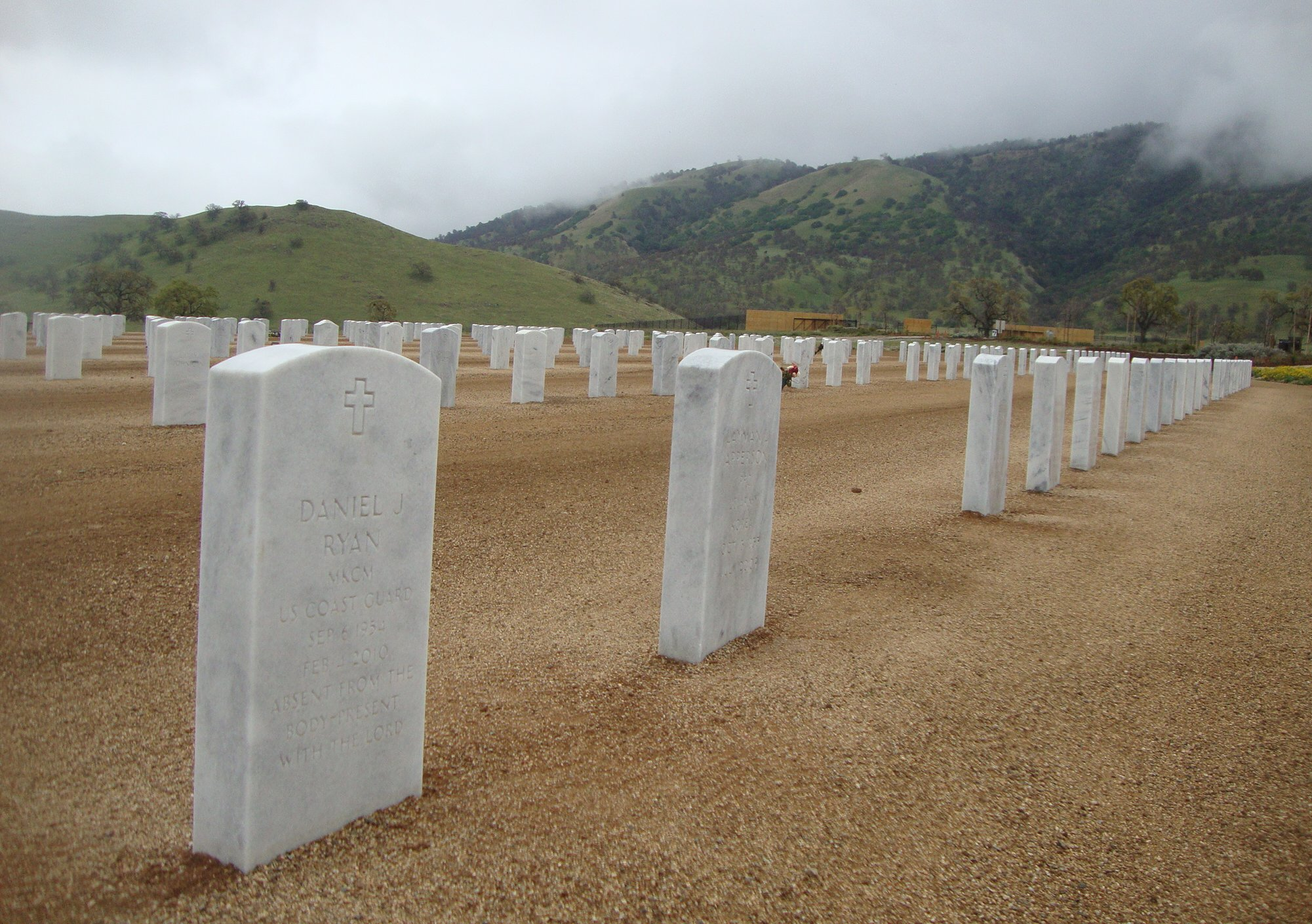
- Bakersfield National Cemetery, March 2012
- Interactive map of Bakersfield National Cemetery

Details
- Established: 2009
- Location: near Bakersfield, California
- Country: United States
- Coordinates: 35°15′19″N 118°40′03″W
- Type: United States National Cemetery
- Owned by: US Dept. of Veterans Affairs
- Size: 500 acres (200 ha)
- No. of interments: >8,500 (2021)
- Website: cem.va.gov/bakersfield.asp
- Find a Grave: Bakersfield National Cemetery

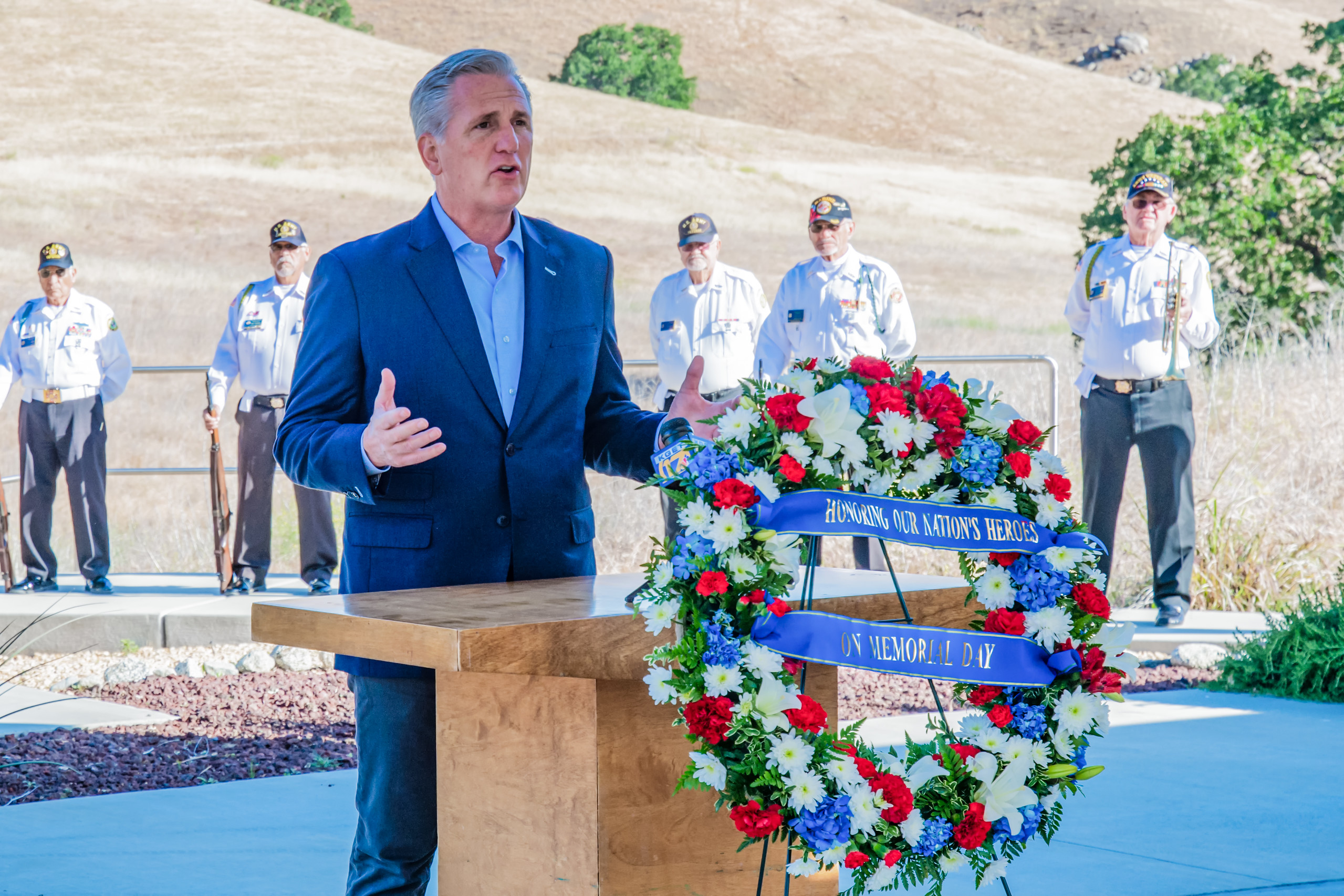
Congressman Kevin McCarthy speaks at Memorial Day at the cemetery in 2020.

Bakersfield National Cemetery is a United States National Cemetery located at 30338 East Bear Mountain Blvd, Arvin, California, in Kern County. It is approximately 20 miles (32 km) east of Bakersfield. It is isolated from urban development by oak studded rolling hills in the Tehachapi Mountains. Administered by the United States Department of Veterans Affairs, the cemetery has space to accommodate caskets and cremated remains on 500 acres (200 ha) of land.

== History ==
The history of the location of the cemetery dates back to the 1840s, when California was a part of Mexico. The land was granted by Mexican Governor Manuel Micheltorena to Jose Antonio Aguirre and Ignacio del Valle. They were the first recorded owners of the property. The land was primarily used for cattle ranching. During the 1850s and 1860s, General Edward Fitzgerald Beale purchased the land, and combined it with other property to form a large ranch. It was named Ranchos el Tejon, or The Tejon Ranch.

In 1915, Bear Mountain Boulevard (SR 223) was constructed, replacing the dangerous White Wolf Road to the south. An important route, it linked the southern San Joaquin Valley, to Tehachapi and industries in the Mojave Desert. It was also a part of the Midway Route, which was one of two routes connecting Bakersfield with Los Angeles. It continued to serve that function until 1933, when Bena Road to the north was constructed, which provided a more direct connection to Bakersfield.

In 2003, congress adopted the National Cemetery Expansion Act. This authorized the creation of six new national cemeteries, including the Bakersfield National Cemetery. The Tejon Ranch Company offered land at multiple sites for the cemetery. Eventually, 500 acres of land adjacent to Bear Mountain Boulevard was selected. In 2007, architectural design contract was awarded to Huitt-Zollars, Inc, in Irvine, California. The cemetery opened in the summer of 2009, with a 20-acre (8.1 ha) early burial site and temporary facilities. Construction of the permanent facilities were completed two years later.

== Notable interments ==
- Charles Napier (1936–2011) – actor and US Army sergeant who served in Korea
