= Yellowstone National Cemetery =

Veterans cemetery in Yellowstone County, Montana

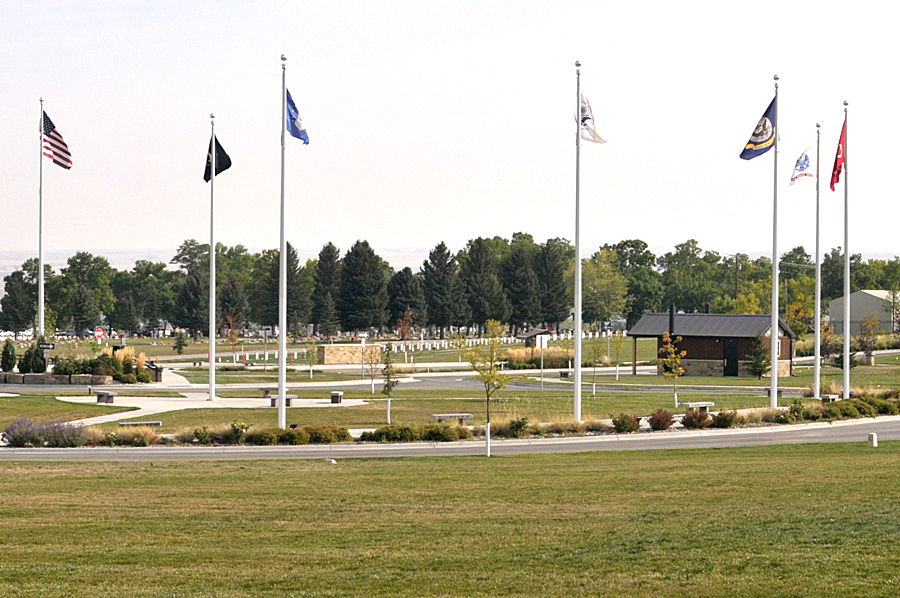
- Yellowstone National Cemetery.
- Interactive map of Yellowstone National Cemetery

Details
- Established: 2014
- Location: Yellowstone County, Montana
- Country: United States
- Coordinates: 45.6963772°N 108.7724053°W
- Type: United States National Cemetery
- Owned by: US Department of Veterans Affairs
- Size: 10 acres (4.0 ha)
- No. of interments: >1,500
- Find a Grave: Yellowstone National Cemetery

Yellowstone National Cemetery is a United States National Cemetery located one mile north of Laurel, Yellowstone County, Montana, at 55 Buffalo Trail Road (state highway 532), administered by the US Department of Veterans Affairs, National Cemetery Administration. The 10.5 acres (4.2 ha) cemetery began as a satellite cemetery of Black Hills National Cemetery; Sturgis, South Dakota. On 18 May 2015 the Department of Veterans Affairs created five national areas of responsibility. Fort Logan National Cemetery, Denver, Colorado, in the newly formed Continental Division, assumed supervisory responsibility for Yellowstone National Cemetery. Yellowstone National Cemetery is the first of eight smaller national burial grounds the Department of Veterans Affairs began in its Rural Veterans Burial Initiative for largely rural states in America.

== History ==
Montana has had a US national cemetery for over 100 years: the Custer National Cemetery at present Little Bighorn Battlefield National Monument; Crow Agency, Montana. On 1 August 1879 the US Army established this cemetery as a National Cemetery of the fourth class. This cemetery included already interred US military battle deaths from the Battle of the Little Big Horn (Custer's Last Stand). As years passed more interments occurred at Custer National Cemetery: including military burials from the Plains Indian Wars, non-battle related deaths from other frontier military forts in the region, and other interments continuing to modern times. On 1 July 1940 the US Army turned over to the US Department of the Interior, US Park Service, the Custer National Cemetery: one of fourteen national cemeteries now managed by the US Park Service. One hundred years of interments exhausted available burial space at Custer National Cemetery, and in January 1978 the US Park Service closed the cemetery to first, or non-reserved, interments.

In 1978 the US Veterans Administration began a state grant program to help states build state veterans cemeteries. In March 1989 US Veterans Administration became a cabinet-level post, designated US Department of Veterans Affairs, (herein "Veterans Affairs"). By the early 2000s Montana had three Veterans Affairs state grant supported veterans cemeteries: Montana State Veterans Cemetery at Helena; Western Montana State Veterans Cemetery at Missoula; and Eastern Montana State Veterans Cemetery at Miles City. The Montana state legislature authorized a state veterans cemetery in Yellowstone County, but did not provide funding. Yellowstone County, Montana's most populous county with Montana's largest city, Billings, has the state's largest veterans' population, but no veterans cemetery.

In the early 2000s Yellowstone County veterans, citing long travel distances to Montana state veterans cemeteries or open national cemeteries, began a grass-roots effort to build a veterans cemetery in Yellowstone County without Veterans Affairs state grant monies. A coalition of Yellowstone County veterans and civic leaders agreed on a plan to fund, design, build, and operate a veterans cemetery in Yellowstone County to Veterans Affairs, National Cemetery Administration, standards, and then petition Veterans Affairs to designate the cemetery a national cemetery.

In November 2006 Yellowstone County, Montana, voters approved by a 61 to 39 percent margin, a countywide mil levy to raise monies to build and operate the newly named Yellowstone County Veterans Cemetery. Yellowstone County purchased about 10 acres (4.0 ha) of land from the city of Laurel, fifteen miles west of Billings, for the cemetery. Peaks to Plains Design, Billings, Montana, a woman-owned small business, designed the cemetery, and Hardy Construction, also from Billings, was construction contractor for the cemetery. Yellowstone County also purchased a 37 acres (15 ha) right-of-way or easement on Montana state land north of the Laurel city land for future cemetery expansion. Yellowstone County Board of Commissioners would govern the cemetery through the Board's appointed Yellowstone County Veterans Cemetery Board.

Yellowstone County veterans, citizens, local and state civic leaders, and Montana's congressional delegation held ground-breaking ceremonies for the $1.7 million Yellowstone County Veterans Cemetery on Memorial Day, 2008, with dedication of the completed cemetery on Veterans Day, 2008. On 8 December 2008 Glenn L. Butz, veteran, US Army, World War II, was the cemetery's first interment.

Yellowstone County veterans and civic leaders began a concerted effort through Montana's US congressional delegation, led by Senator Jon Tester, D-Mont, a member of the Senate Veterans Affairs Committee, to have Veterans Affairs designate Yellowstone County Veterans Cemetery a national cemetery. The effort centered on showing Veterans Affairs the need for smaller-in-scale national cemeteries for America's predominantly rural states. In 2011, Veterans Affairs began its Rural Veterans Burial Initiative Program (herein "Rural Initiative") to improve burial access for veterans residing in America's rural areas. Veterans Affairs looked at states lacking a National cemetery with available space for first interments. In 2012 Veterans Affairs designated eight states to have smaller national burial grounds. The states are Montana, Wyoming, Utah, Nevada, Idaho, North Dakota, Wisconsin, and Maine. Veterans Affairs agreed to take Yellowstone County Veterans Cemetery under the Rural Initiative, but only the cemetery's already built and developed 10 acres (4.0 ha).

Veterans Affairs asked for public input on a name for the new national cemetery; Montana's citizens submitted fifty two different proposed names. Proposed name Yellowstone National Cemetery came from a veteran in Laurel, Yellowstone County, Montana, who lived near the cemetery. The veteran sent an email on 3 January 2014 to US Senator Jon Tester, D-Mont.; Veterans Affairs, National Cemetery Administration, Denver, Colorado; and to the Yellowstone County Board of Commissioners, which read in part, "The name Yellowstone National Cemetery meets VA requirements of location, region, and broad inspiring appeal. The name reflects grandeur of America's west, with nobility, strength, courage, and character: hallmarks befitting sacrifice, honor, and gallantry of America's military veterans. The lasting name of this hallowed ground must fervently and sincerely honor the very soul and service of veterans forever interred there, Yellowstone National Cemetery is that name." Veterans Affairs agreed with the recommended name, Yellowstone National Cemetery.

On 26 May 2014 Yellowstone County, Montana, officially donated to Veterans Affairs without financial cost to the federal government, the renamedYellowstone National Cemetery. Veterans Affairs officials, Montana's congressional delegation, local civic leaders, veterans, and citizens dedicated the new national cemetery on 27 May 2014. Dedication ceremony included tribal blessings in native language and native ceremonies by leaders of the Crow Nation and Northern Cheyenne Nation in Montana.

During summer 2016 the National Cemetery Administration completed a significant enhancement project for Yellowstone National Cemetery. These enhancements included installation of 762 in-ground concrete crypts capable of interring 1,524 caskets, a new larger 320-niche columbarium, new signage, and a new interment plaza.

During summer 2021 the National Cemetery Administration completed construction of three more columbaria at Yellowstone National Cemetery. This increased columbaria capacity by 960 niches.

As of 1 Jan 2026 Yellowstone National Cemetery has had over 2,500 interments/memorials.

== Gallery ==
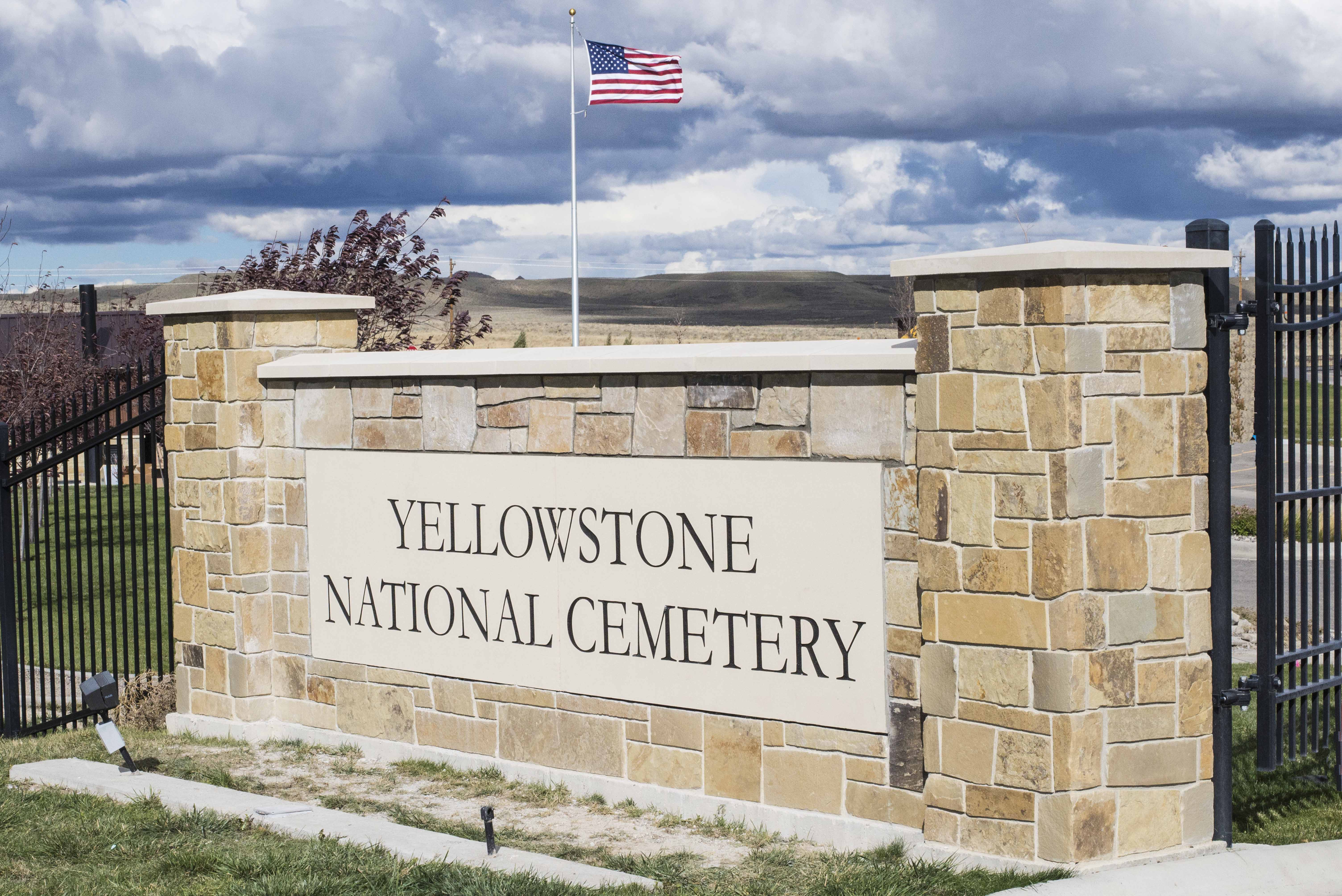

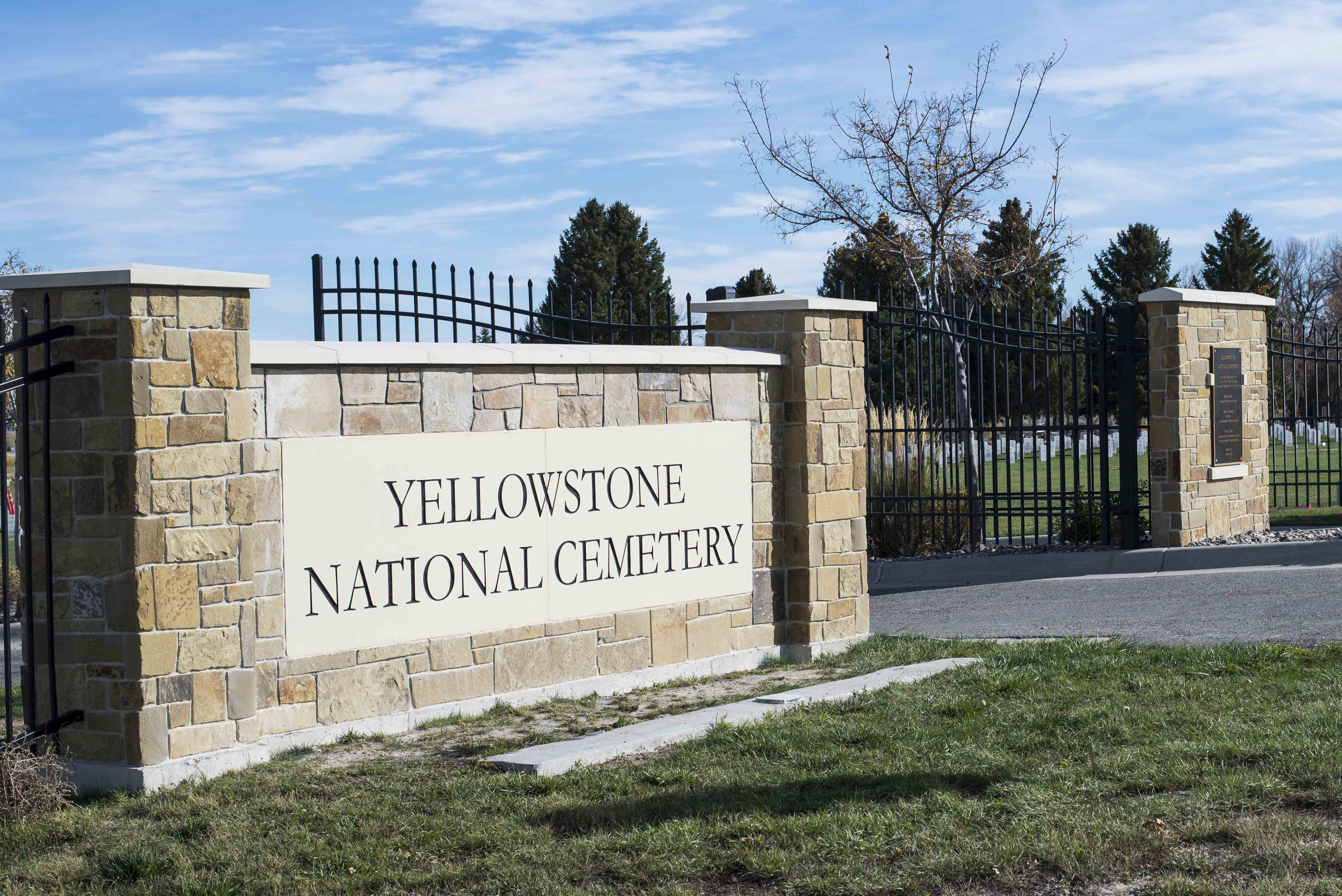

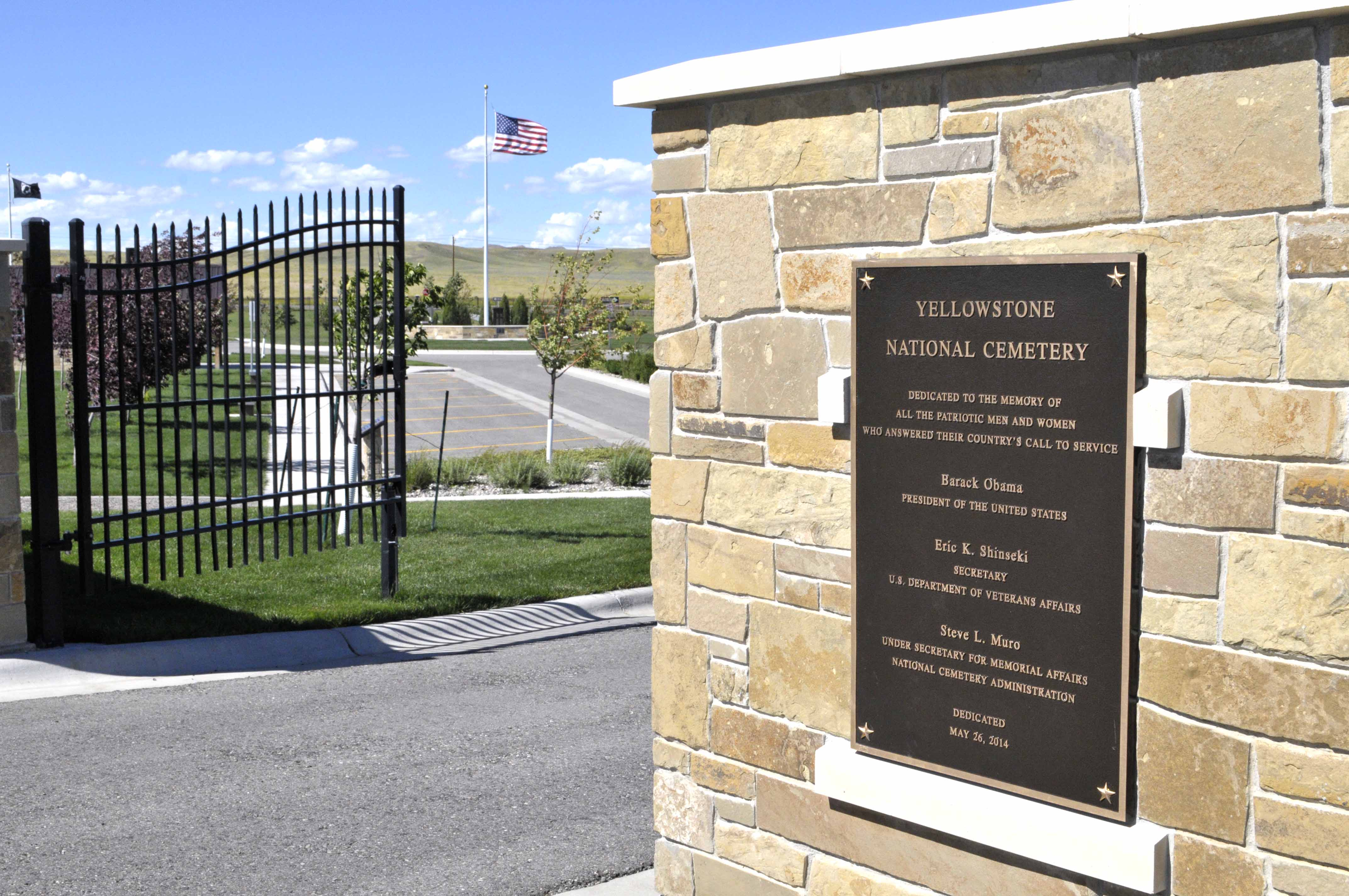

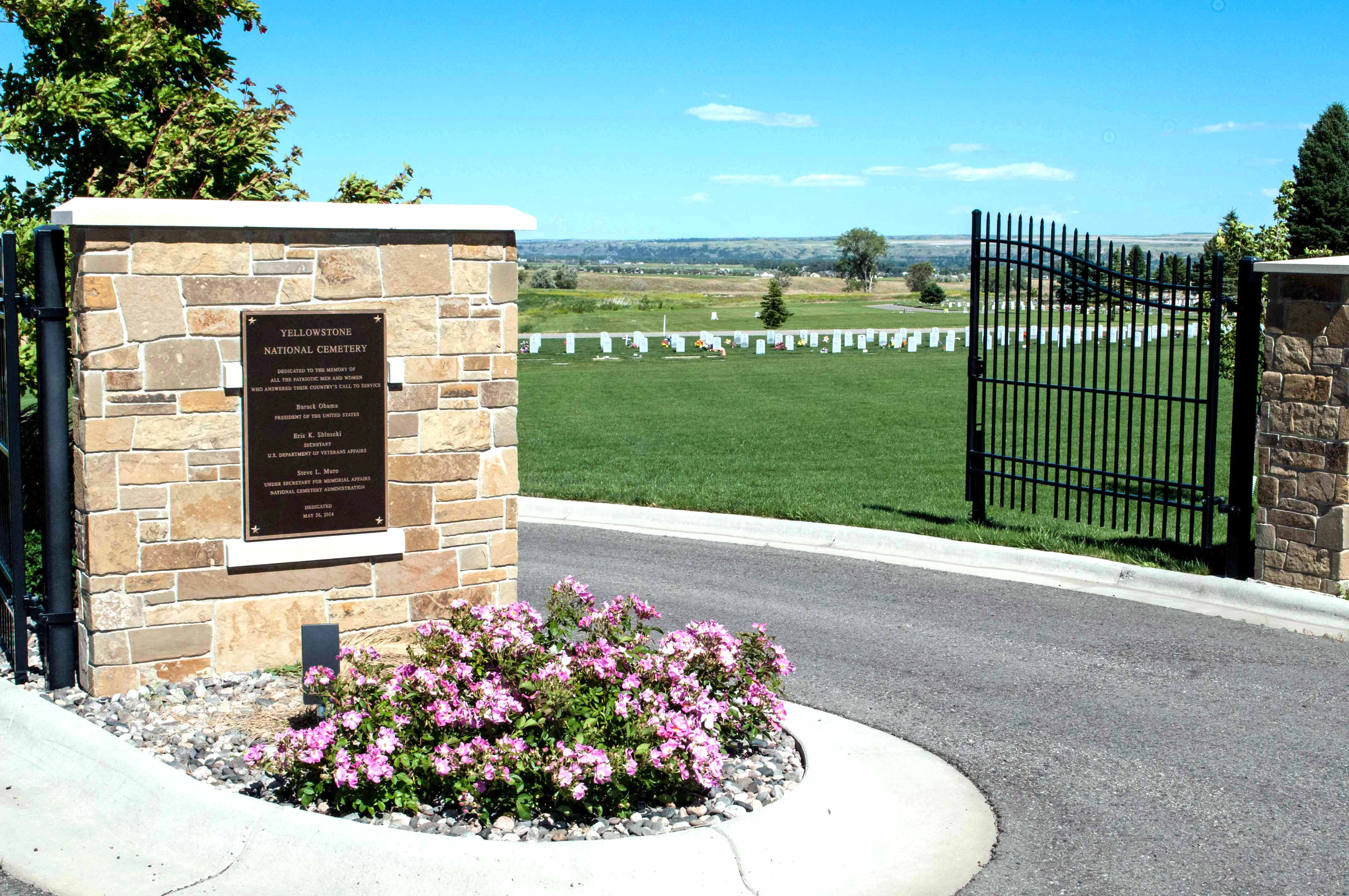

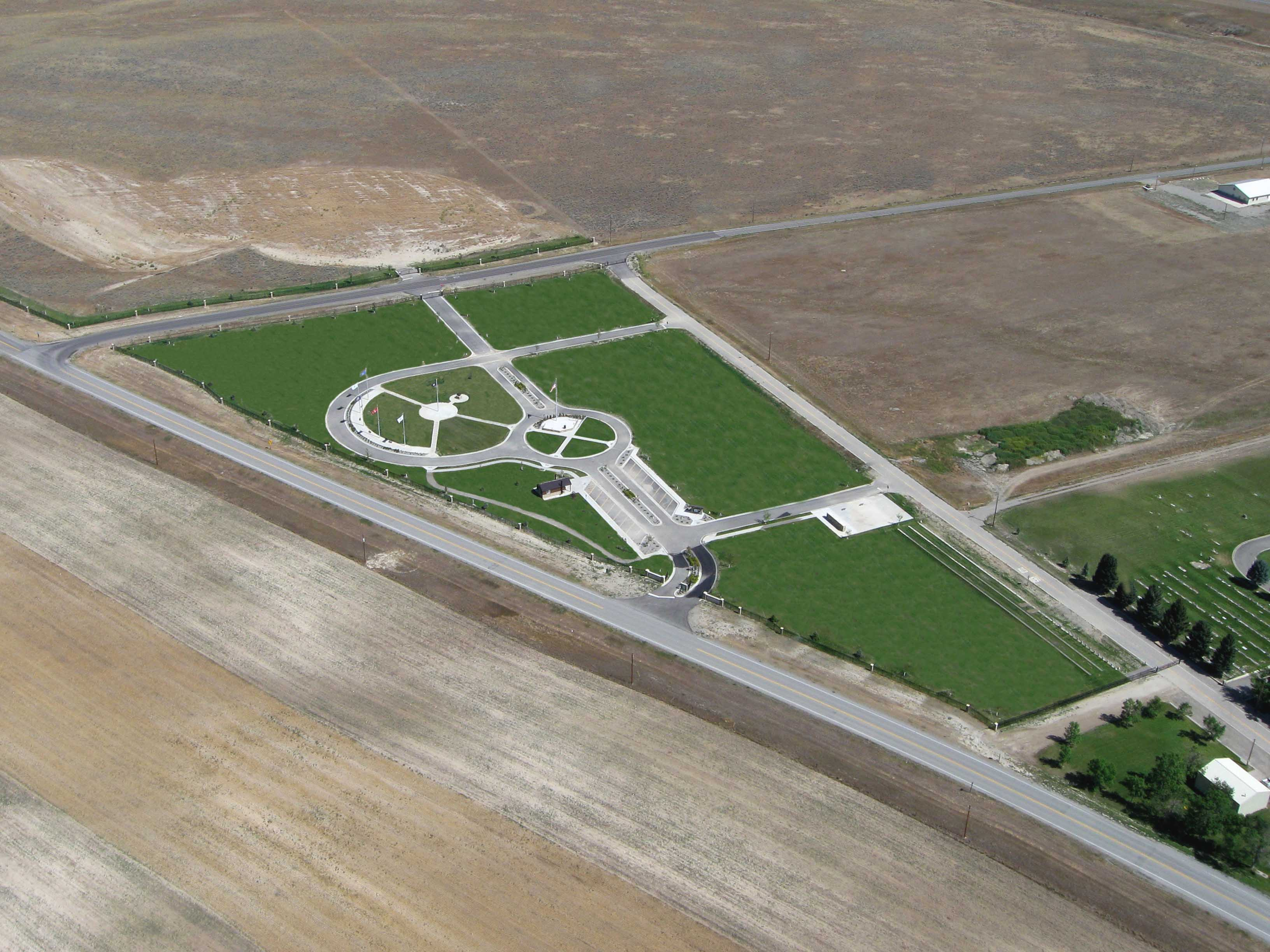

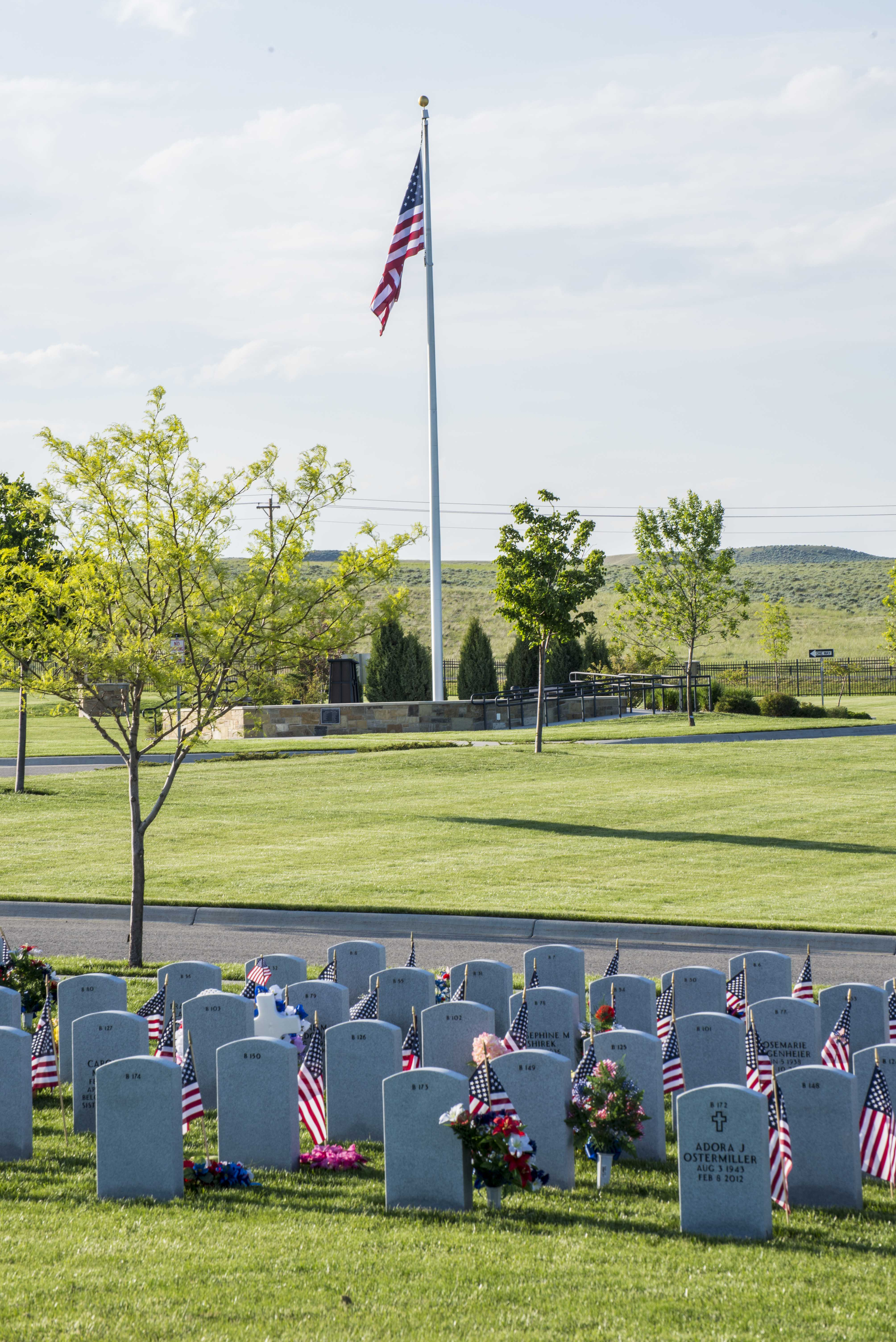

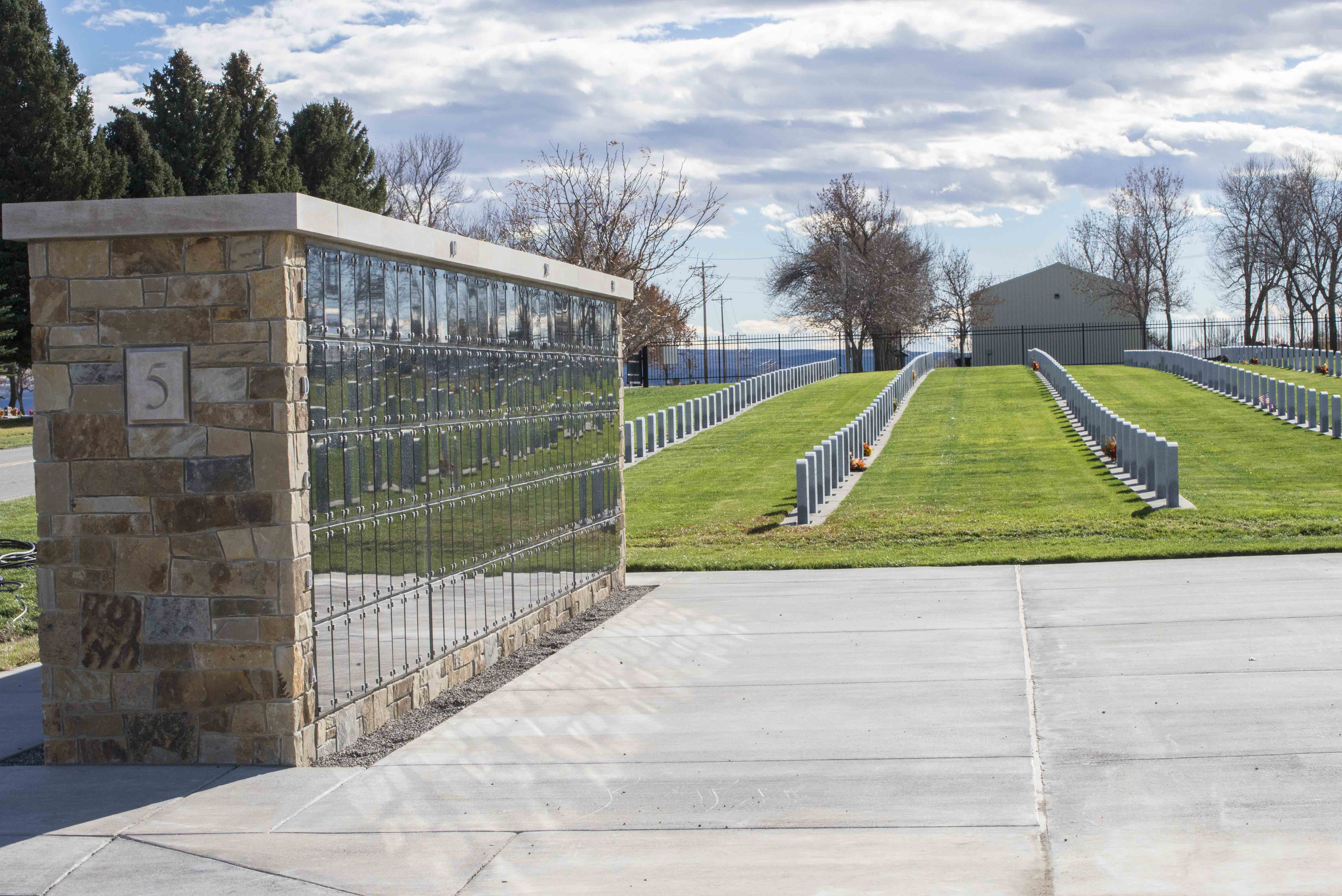
