= Cheyenne National Cemetery =

Cemetery in Laramie County, Wyoming

Coordinates: 41.179774°N 104.903963°W

- Interactive map of Cheyenne National Cemetery

Details
- Established: October 8, 2020
- Location: Cheyenne, Wyoming

The Cheyenne National Cemetery is a cemetery in Cheyenne, Wyoming. It is the first and only national cemetery in Wyoming. It was dedicated by the United States Department of Veterans Affairs on October 8, 2020.
