= Roseburg National Cemetery =

Veterans cemetery in Douglas County, Oregon

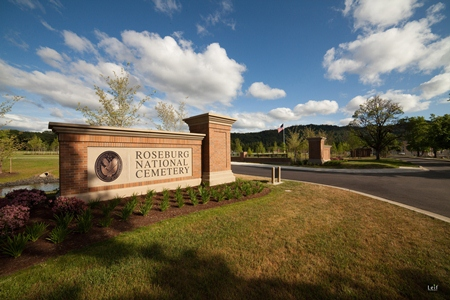
- Roseburg National Cemetery Sign
- Interactive map of Roseburg National Cemetery

Details
- Established: 1897
- Location: Roseburg, Douglas County, Oregon
- Country: United States
- Coordinates: 43°12′53″N 123°22′13″W
- No. of interments: 7,000+
- Website: Official
- Find a Grave: Roseburg National Cemetery

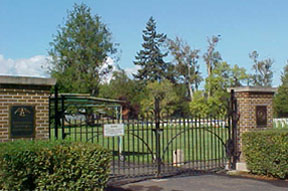
Roseburg National Cemetery gates

Roseburg National Cemetery is a United States National Cemetery located in Roseburg in Douglas County, Oregon. Administered by the United States Department of Veterans Affairs, it encompasses 4.1 acres (1.7 ha), and as of 2014, had more than 5,400 interments. It is managed by the Eagle Point National Cemetery.

== History ==
Roseburg National Cemetery was established in 1897 to inter veterans who died while under care at the Oregon State Soldiers Home. In 1933, management was transferred to the Veteran's Administration, and in 1973, it became a National Cemetery.

== Monuments ==
- POW Memorial – donated by Veterans of 20th Century.
