= Corinth National Cemetery =

United States veterans cemetery

- U.S. National Register of Historic Places
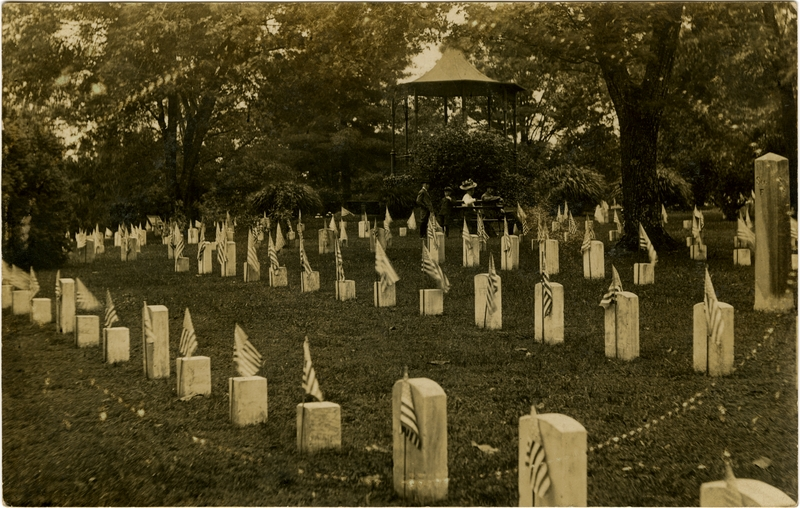
- Graves seen in the early 20th century

- Location within Mississippi Location within the United States
- Location: 1551 Horton St., Corinth, Mississippi
- Coordinates: 34°55′35″N 88°30′36″W
- Area: 20 acres (8.1 ha)
- Built: 1866
- Architectural style: Dutch colonial
- MPS: Civil War Era National Cemeteries MPS
- NRHP reference No.: 96001352
- Added to NRHP: November 20, 1996

Corinth National Cemetery is a United States National Cemetery in the city of Corinth, in Alcorn County, Mississippi. Administered by the United States Department of Veterans Affairs, it encompasses 20 acres (8.1 ha), and as of the end of 2005, had 7,137 interments. It is managed by the Memphis National Cemetery.

== History ==
Corinth National Cemetery was established in 1866 as a place to inter the Union casualties of the Second Battle of Corinth, and other battles in the region. By the late 1870s there were over 5,000 interments in the cemetery, nearly 4,000 of which were of unknown dead.

Corinth National Cemetery was added to the National Register of Historic Places in 1996.

Along with other sites, it was included in Siege and Battle of Corinth Sites, a National Historic Landmark designated in 1991
