= Fort Harrison National Cemetery =

Historic veterans cemetery in Henrico County, Virginia

- U.S. National Register of Historic Places
- Virginia Landmarks Register
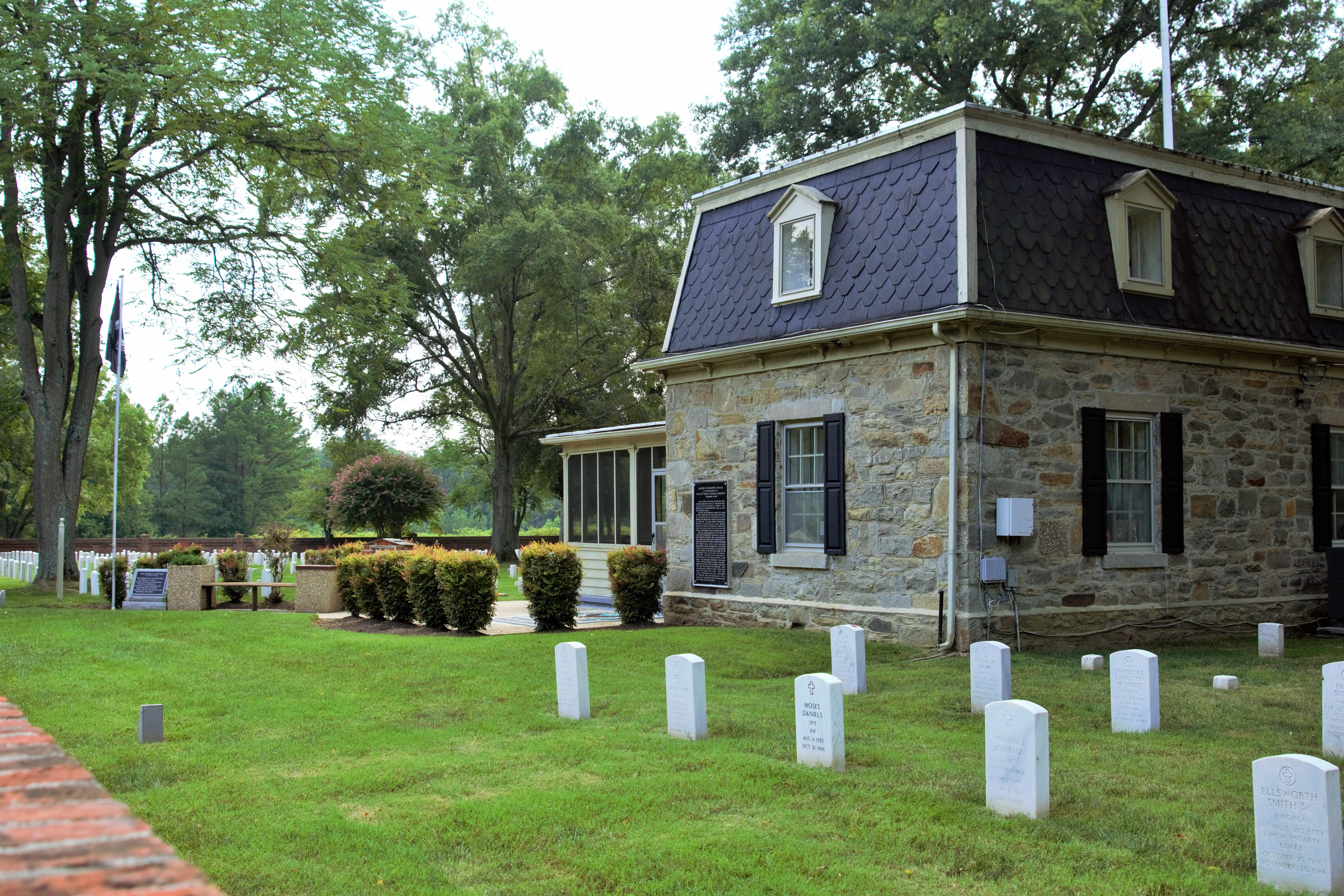

- Location within Virginia Location within the United States
- Nearest city: Richmond, Virginia
- Coordinates: 37°25′43″N 77°21′59″W
- Area: 2 acres (0.81 ha)
- Built: 1866
- Architect: Meigs, Montgomery C.
- Architectural style: Second Empire
- MPS: Civil War Era National Cemeteries MPS
- NRHP reference No.: 95000921
- VLR No.: 043-0134

Significant dates
- Added to NRHP: August 10, 1995
- Designated VLR: April 28, 1995

Fort Harrison National Cemetery is a United States National Cemetery located seven miles (11 km) south of the city of Richmond, in Henrico County, Virginia. Administered by the United States Department of Veterans Affairs, It encompasses 1.5 acres (0.61 ha), and as of the end of 2005, had 1,570 interments.

The cemetery was established in 1866. It was listed on the National Register of Historic Places in 1995.

== History ==
Established after the American Civil War as a place to reinter the Union dead from the various battlefield sites around the area, including from the Battle of Chaffin's Farm. The majority of interments at the cemetery are unknown, and also includes four Confederate prisoners of war that were held at the Fort during the time it was held by the Union.

== Notable interments ==
- Private George A. Buchanan (1842–1864 †), Medal of Honor recipient for action at the Battle of Chaffin's Farm during the Civil War.
