= Jefferson City National Cemetery =

Historic veterans cemetery in Cole County, Missouri

- U.S. National Register of Historic Places
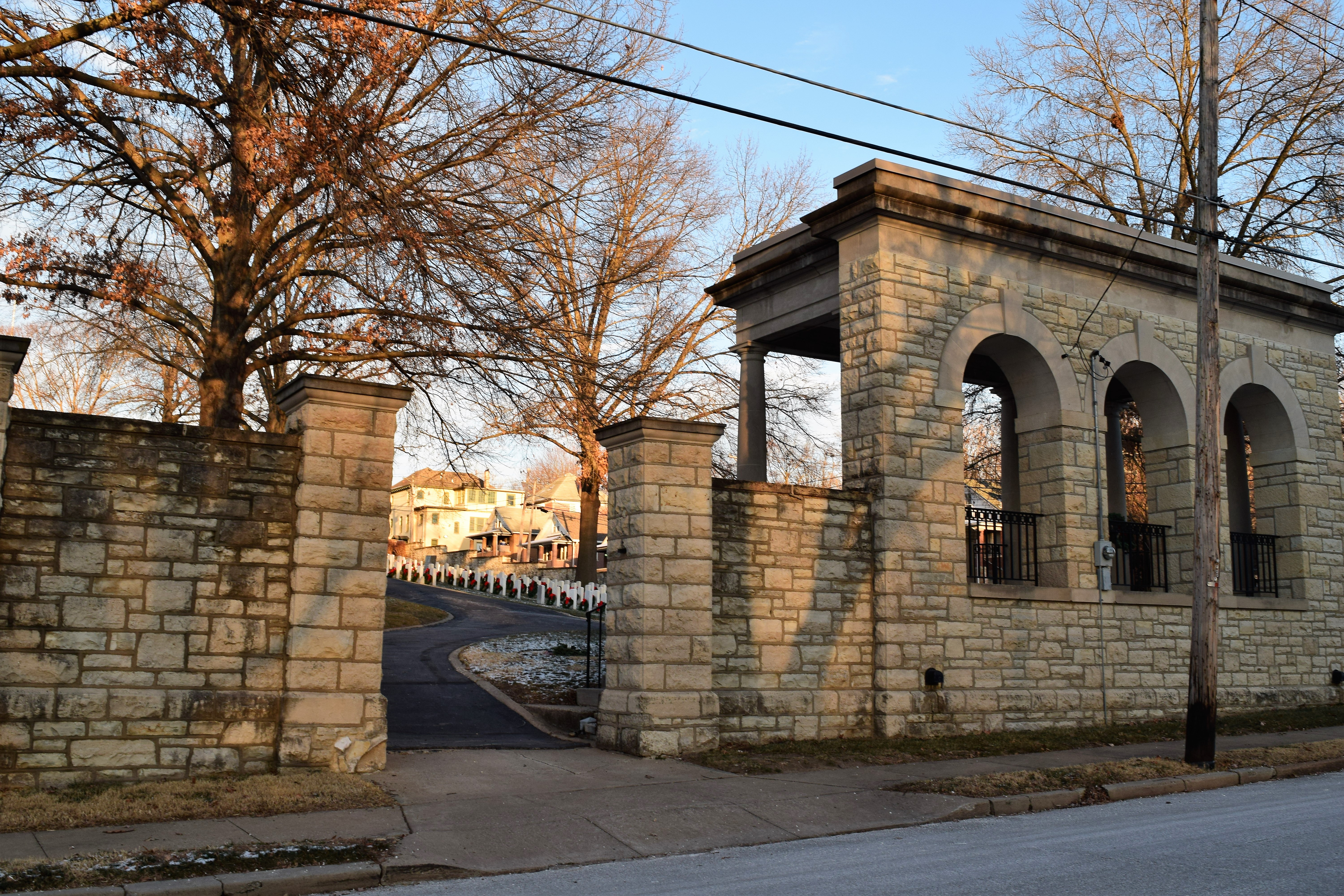
- Entrance to the cemetery on Miller Street

- Location within Missouri Location within the United States
- Location: 1024 E. McCarty St., Jefferson City, Missouri
- Coordinates: 38°33′59″N 92°09′42″W
- Area: 2 acres (0.81 ha)
- Built: 1867
- Architect: Meigs, Montgomery C.
- Architectural style: Second Empire, Classical Revival
- MPS: Civil War Era National Cemeteries MPS
- NRHP reference No.: 98001221
- Added to NRHP: October 01, 1998

Jefferson City National Cemetery is a United States National Cemetery located in Jefferson City, in Cole County, Missouri. Administered by the United States Department of Veterans Affairs, it encompasses 2 acres (0.81 ha), and as of the end of 2005, had 1,792 interments. It is administered by Jefferson Barracks National Cemetery.

== History ==
The first interments took place in Jefferson City National Cemetery in 1861, and were American Civil War soldiers who died in the skirmishes that took place in the region. Though, the area did not see any wide-scale combat, it was officially designated a National Cemetery in 1867.

Jefferson City National Cemetery was listed on the National Register of Historic Places on October 1, 1998.

== Noteworthy monuments ==
The 39th Regiment Monument of Centralia, Missouri, erected circa 1968 to commemorate those members of the Missouri Volunteer Infantry who died at the hands of William T. Anderson's bushwhacker forces in the Centralia Massacre (Missouri).
