= Alton National Cemetery =

Historic veterans cemetery in Madison County, Illinois

- U.S. National Register of Historic Places
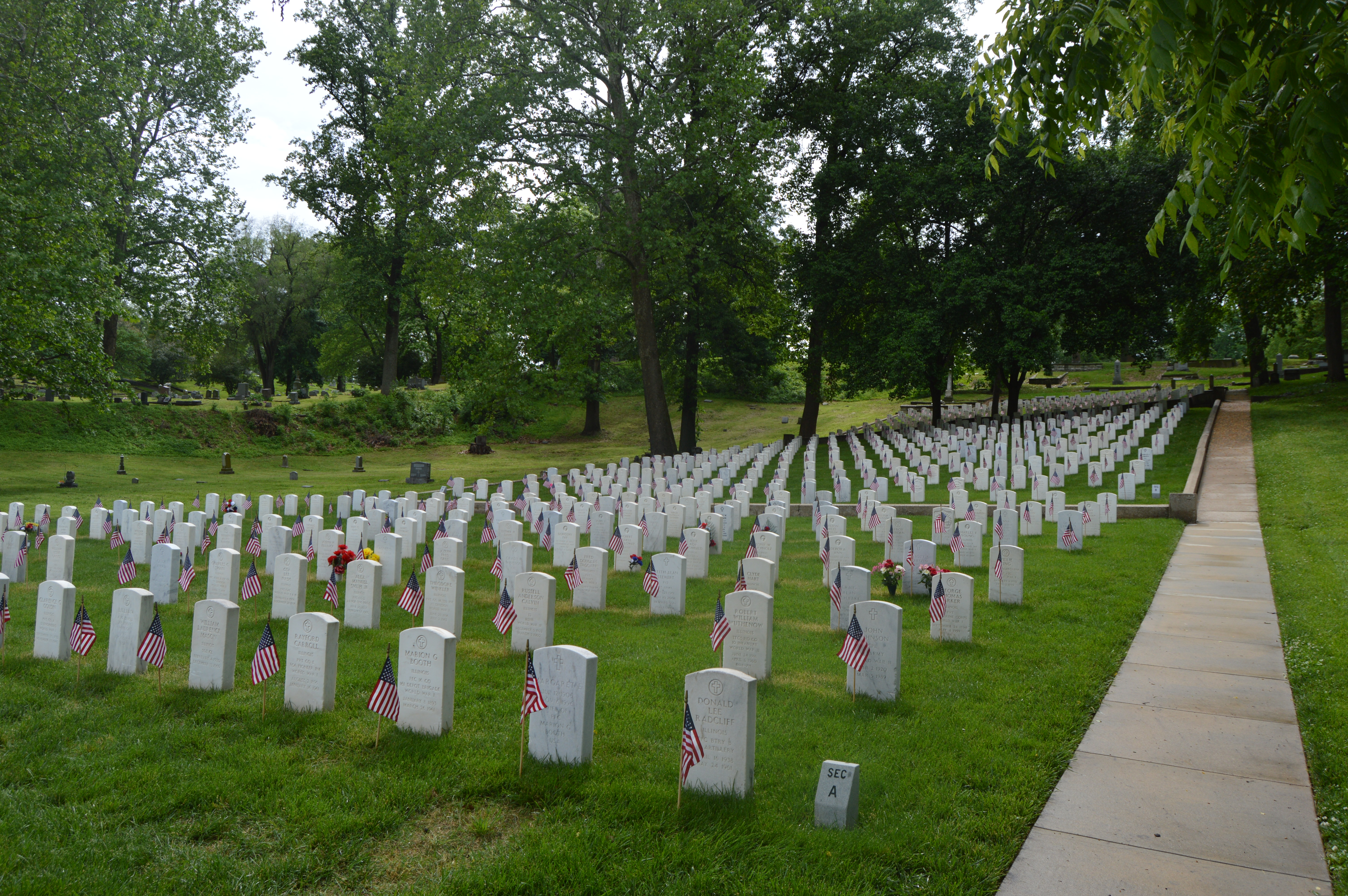
- Overview from the northeast

- Location within Illinois
- Location: 600 Pearl St. Alton, Illinois
- Coordinates: 38°53′26″N 90°09′49″W
- Built: 1870
- MPS: Civil War Era National Cemeteries MPS
- NRHP reference No.: 11000245

Alton National Cemetery is a United States National Cemetery located in the city of Alton, in Madison County, Illinois. Administered by the United States Department of Veterans Affairs, it encompasses only half an acre plot of land, and as of the end of 2005, had 522 interments. It is maintained by the Jefferson Barracks National Cemetery, in St. Louis, Missouri.

== History ==
Originally a military section of the Alton City Cemetery, and in use since 1870, the half acre lot was donated to the federal government in 1940. It was intended that the remains buried in the cemetery be moved to the Springfield National Cemetery, but public protest prevented it. It is the resting place of many Civil War Union soldiers.

In 2006, Alton announced the first of what is hoped to be an annual Memorial Day Sunset Ceremony at the cemetery that will include speeches by local elected officials, a performance by the Scott Air Force Base band, Pipes and Drums, and a VFW 21-gun salute. This event is well-attended and has continued as of 2018.

Burials are limited to cremains and, as of August 2018, soon to be limited to "second interments" of the second decedent, whether that is the veteran, spouse, or a child.
