= Vancouver Barracks National Cemetery =

Veterans cemetery in Clark County, Washington

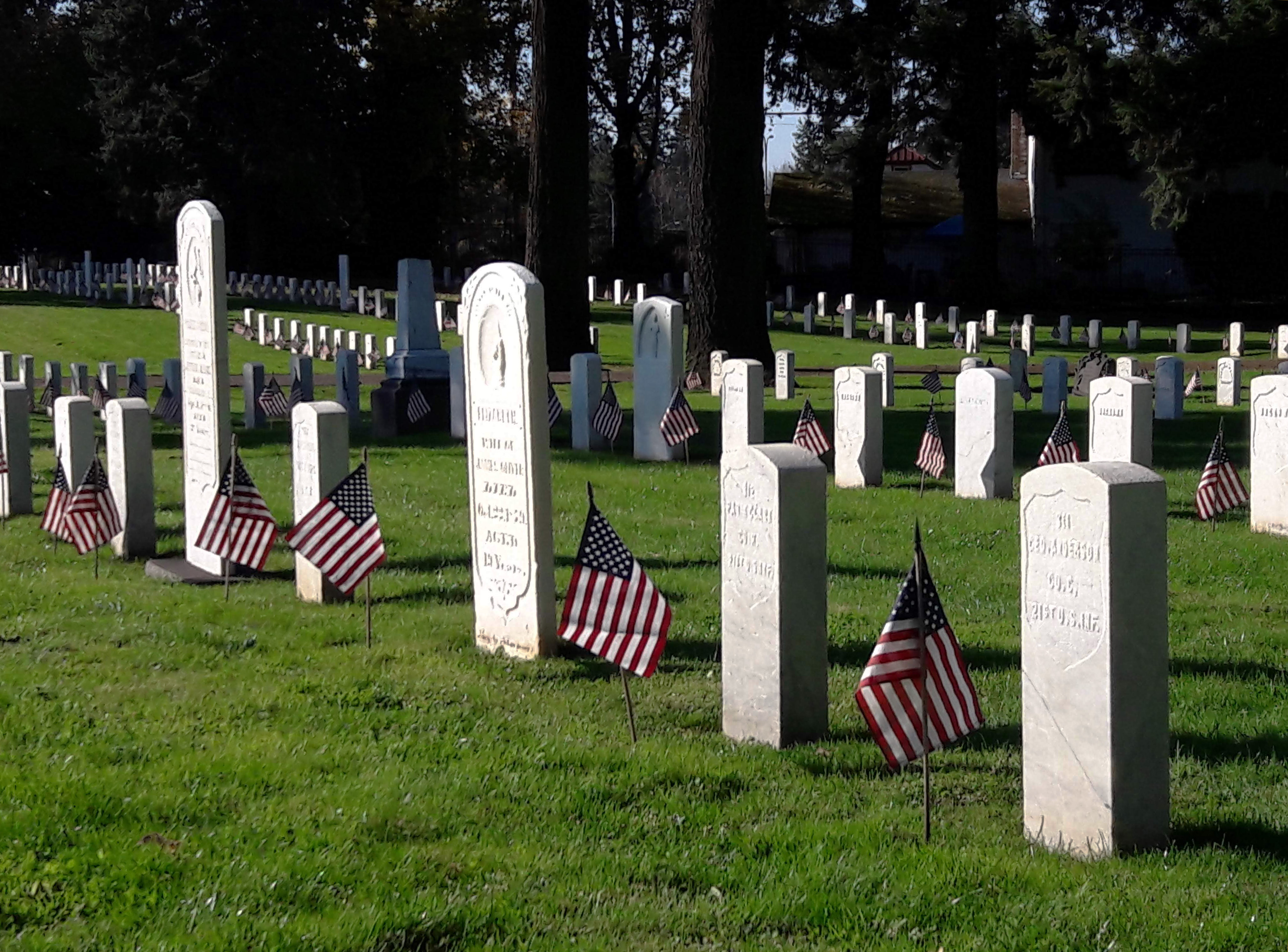
- Interactive map of Vancouver Barracks National Cemetery

Details
- Location: Vancouver, Washington
- Country: United States
- Coordinates: 45°38′24″N 122°39′32″W
- Type: United States National Cemetery
- No. of interments: >1,500
- Website: Official
- Find a Grave: Vancouver Barracks National Cemetery

Vancouver Barracks National Cemetery is a United States National Cemetery in Vancouver, Washington. It was established in 1849 and has over 1,500 interred remains on its 5.74-acre (2.32 ha) grounds. The cemetery was managed by the United States Army until March 2020, when the National Cemetery Administration took over management. It is the second national cemetery in Washington, after Tahoma National Cemetery in the Seattle metropolitan area.
