= Fort Scott National Cemetery =

Historic veterans cemetery in Bourbon County, Kansas

- U.S. National Register of Historic Places
- U.S. Historic district
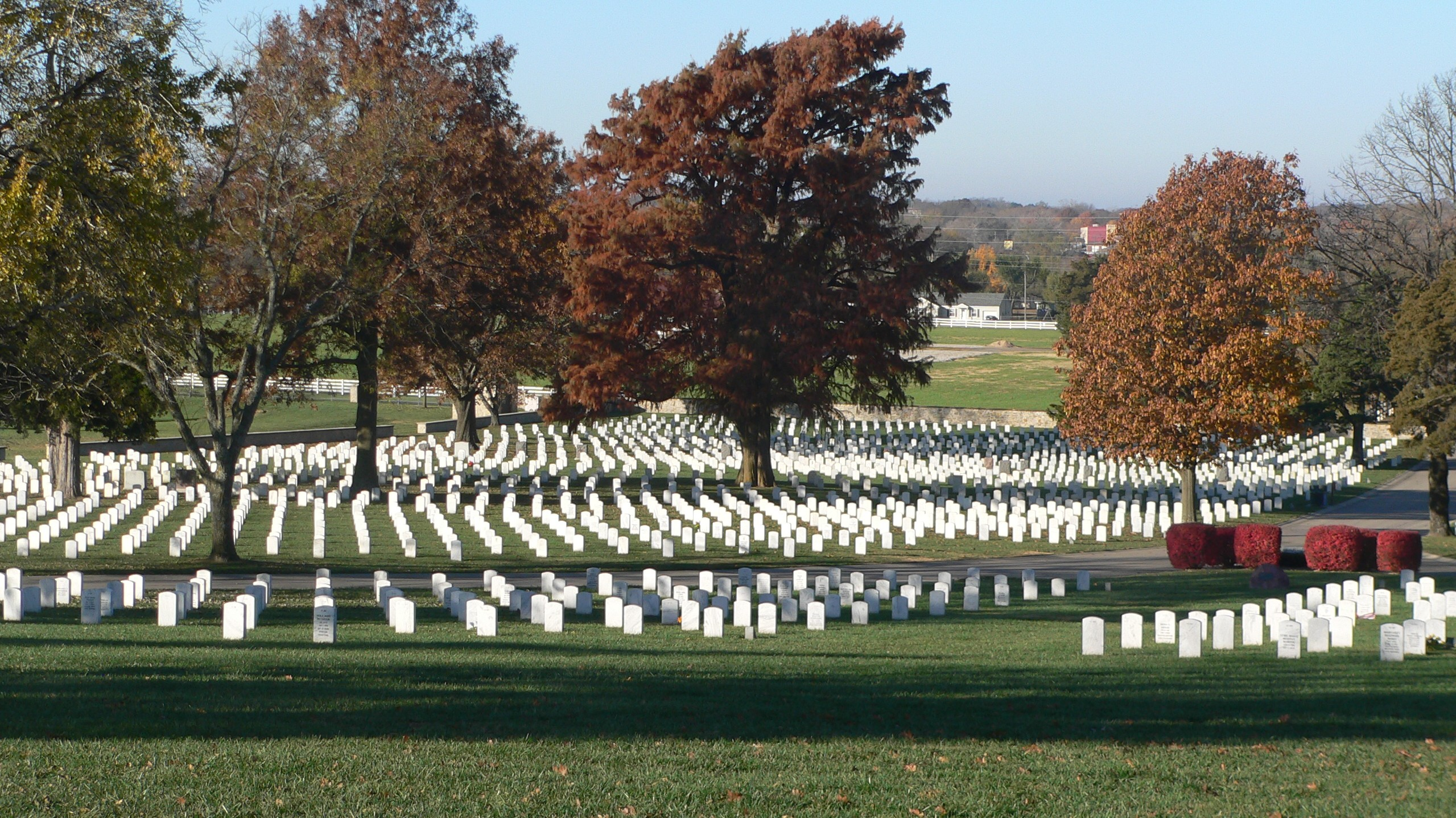

- Location within Kansas Location within the United States
- Location: 900 East National Ave., Fort Scott, Kansas
- Coordinates: 37°49′15″N 94°41′37″W
- Area: 6.7 acres (2.7 ha)
- Built: 1842
- NRHP reference No.: 99000835
- Added to NRHP: October 15, 1966

Fort Scott National Cemetery is a United States National Cemetery located in Fort Scott, in Bourbon County, Kansas. Administered by the United States Department of Veterans Affairs, it encompasses 21.8 acres (8.8 ha), and as of 2021, had more than 8,000 interments. It is one of three national cemeteries in Kansas (the other two being Fort Leavenworth and Leavenworth).

== History ==
Fort Scott was established in 1842, on what was known as Military Road, between Fort Leavenworth, Kansas and Fort Gibson, Oklahoma. It was named for Lieutenant General Winfield Scott. During the initial years, a small plot on the west side of the fort was used as a cemetery. In 1861, a new plot was purchased, and named Presbyterian Graveyard as it was maintained by the Presbyterian Church. During the American Civil War, it was used to inter soldiers who died in battles near in the area. The plot and an adjacent tract of land became Fort Scott National Cemetery on November 15, 1862. One of the twelve original United States National Cemeteries designated by Abraham Lincoln, it has the distinction of being listed as U.S. National Cemetery #1.

At the end of the Civil War, the original fort cemetery interments were moved into the National Cemetery; as well, at the close of the Indian Wars, many frontier posts, such as Fort Lincoln, were abandoned and had their cemeteries transferred to Fort Scott.

The cemetery also contains the Commonwealth war graves of two Royal Canadian Air Force officers of World War II.

Fort Scott National Cemetery was listed on the National Register of Historic Places in 1999.

== Commemorative monuments ==
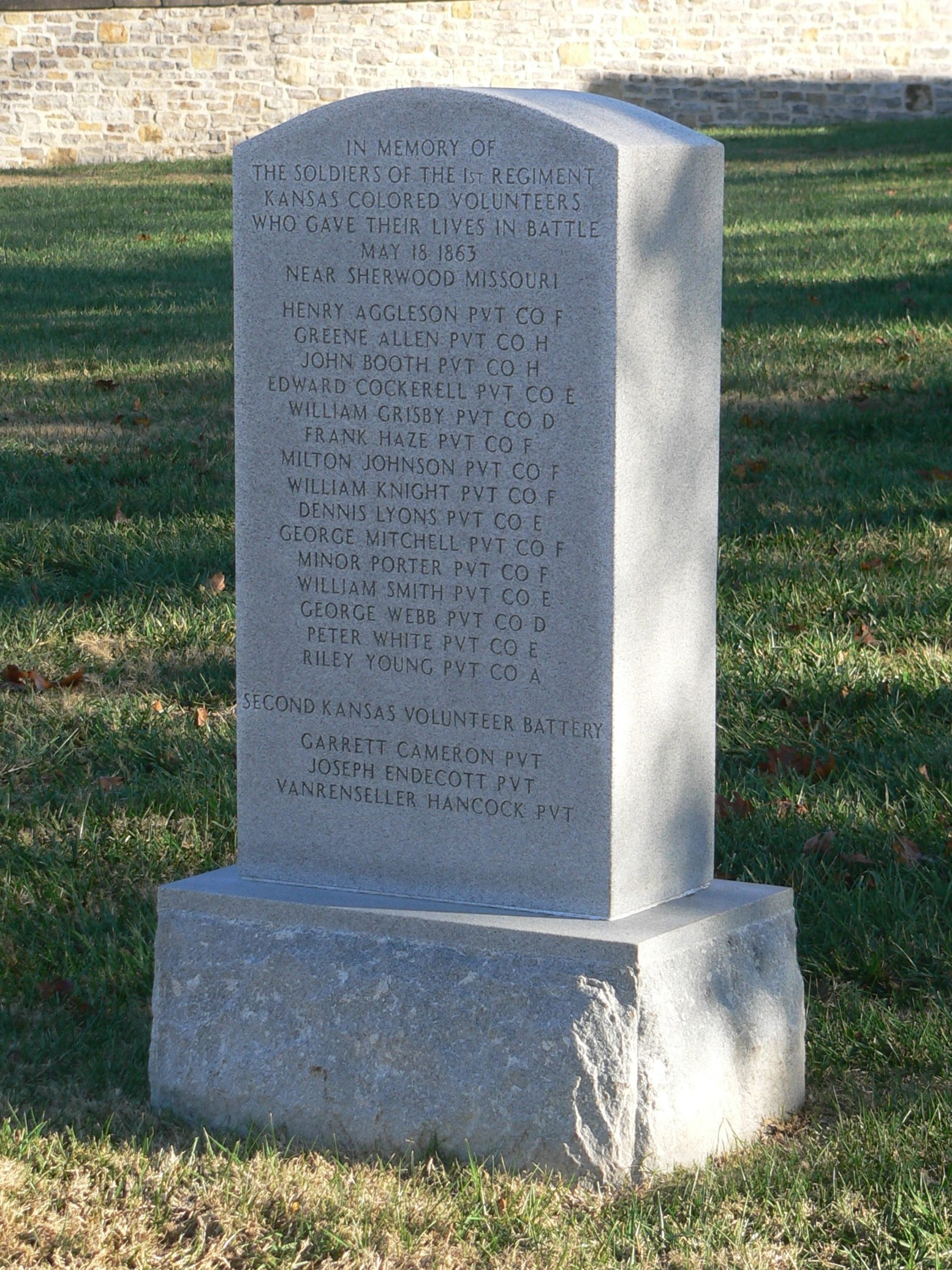
First Kansas Colored Volunteers monument

A large sandstone boulder marks the grave of Eugene Fitch Ware, and his wife Jeannette Huntington Ware. Ware served in the Union Army during the Civil War, eventually reaching the rank of captain. He was subsequently admitted to the bar, and served two terms in the Kansas state legislature. He was noted in his time as an author and poet, writing under the pseudonym "Ironquill". Shortly before his death in 1911, he asked that the boulder, whose natural beauty appealed to him, be used as his grave marker.

A gray granite monument commemorates the First Kansas Colored Volunteer Infantry, which was based at Fort Scott during the Civil War. The regiment was recruited as a Kansas state unit in August 1862, and mustered into federal service in January 1863, following the Emancipation Proclamation. The monument lists the names of soldiers killed in a May 18, 1863 fight near Sherwood, Missouri.

== See also ==
- United States National Cemetery System
