= Danville National Cemetery (Virginia) =

Historic cemetery in Virginia, United States

- U.S. National Register of Historic Places
- Virginia Landmarks Register
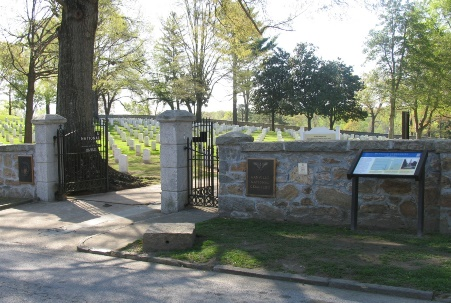
- Entrance to the cemetery

- Location within Virginia Location within the United States
- Location: 721 Lee St., Danville, Virginia
- Coordinates: 36°34′37″N 79°23′22″W
- Area: 4 acres (1.6 ha)
- Built: 1866
- Architectural style: Colonial Revival
- MPS: Civil War Era National Cemeteries MPS
- NRHP reference No.: 95000274
- VLR No.: 108-0057

Significant dates
- Added to NRHP: April 7, 1995
- Designated VLR: January 15, 1995

Danville National Cemetery is a United States National Cemetery located in the city of Danville, Virginia. Administered by the United States Department of Veterans Affairs, it encompasses 3.5 acres (1.4 ha) and, as of the end of 2005, it had 2,282 interments. It is managed by Salisbury National Cemetery.

== History ==
Danville National Cemetery was established by the federal government on August 14, 1867 on a plot of 2.6 acres (1.1 ha). This was part of the process to recognize and commemorate the military dead. Almost all of the original interments were Union prisoners-of-war who had been held in the city of Danville. Tobacco warehouses were converted into Confederate internment facilities for this purpose.

Most of the Union prisoners, as was the case for soldiers throughout the war, died of infectious diseases and malnutrition. These soldiers were initially buried in poorly marked, mass graves. They were later exhumed and reinterred with individual markers. Soldiers were from numerous states, including Ohio, Illinois, Pennsylvania, Massachusetts, New York, New Jersey, and Wisconsin. The cemetery is open to visitors throughout the year.

Danville National Cemetery was listed on the National Register of Historic Places in 1995.
