= List of cemeteries in Maine =

This list of cemeteries in Maine includes currently operating, historical (closed for new interments), and defunct (graves abandoned or removed) cemeteries, columbaria, and mausolea which are historical and/or notable. It does not include pet cemeteries.

== Androscoggin County ==
- Riverside Cemetery, Lewiston
- St. Peter's Cemetery, Lewiston

== Aroostook County ==
- Fairmount Cemetery, Presque Isle

== Cumberland County ==
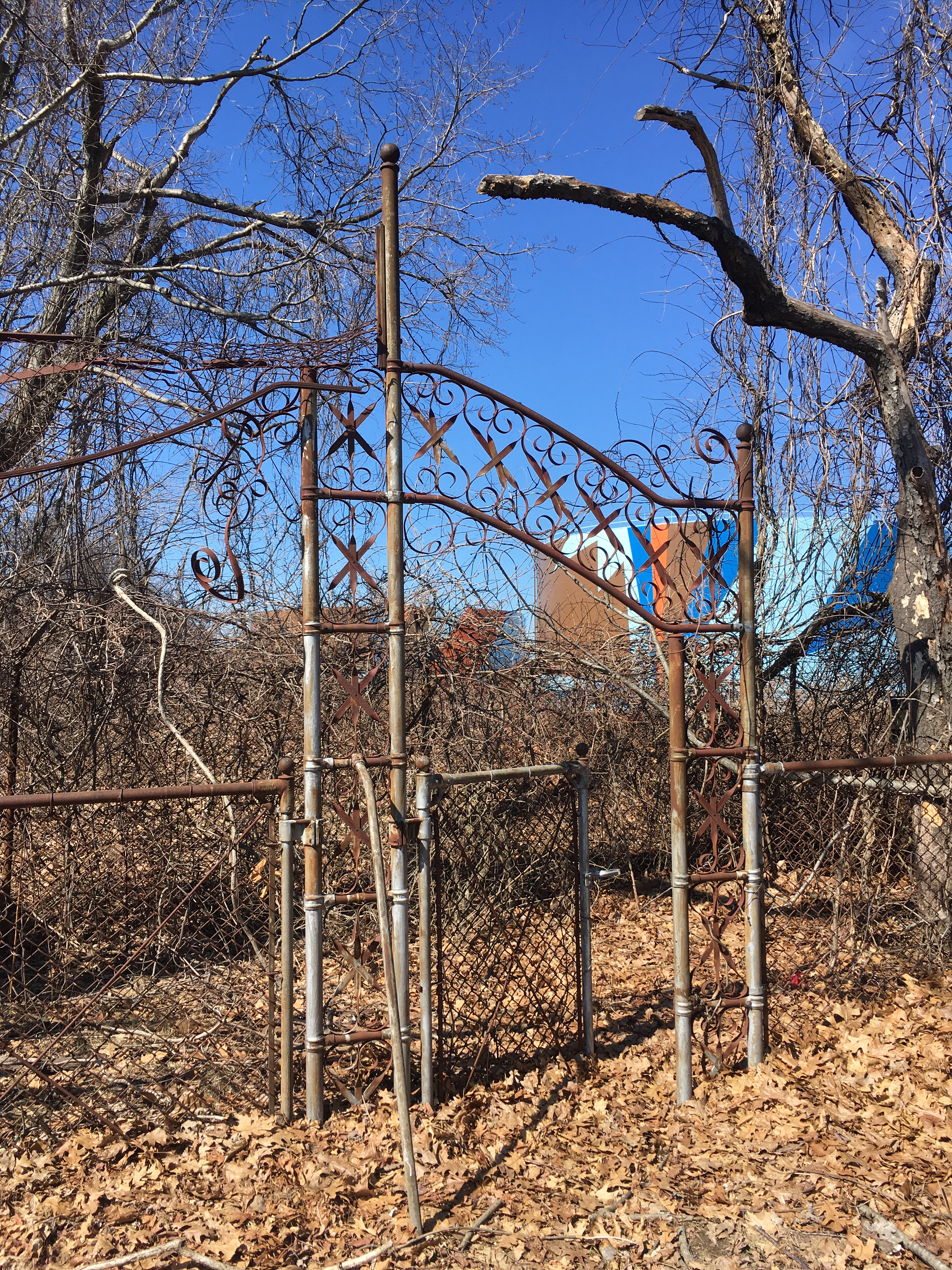
Calvary Cemetery in South Portland, Cumberland County

- Bowie Cemetery, North Yarmouth
- Calvary Cemetery, South Portland
- Eastern Gray Cemetery, Gray
- Eastern Cemetery, Portland; NRHP-listed
- Eastern Promenade has the 1812 cemetery, Portland
- Elder Family Cemetery, Gray
- Evergreen Cemetery, Portland; NRHP-listed
- First Parish Cemetery, Freeport
- Forest City Cemetery, South Portland
- Freeman Cemetery, Gray
- Grand Trunk Cemetery, East Deering neighborhood of Portland
- Gray Village Cemetery, Gray
- Hill Cemetery, Yarmouth
- Libby Cemetery, Gray
- Ledge Cemetery (or Cemetery under the Ledge), Yarmouth
- Mann Cemetery, Freeport
- Old Baptist Cemetery, Yarmouth
- Old Settlers Cemetery, at Southern Maine Community College, South Portland
- Pine Grove Cemetery, North Yarmouth
- Pioneer Cemetery (or Pioneers Burial Ground and the 'Indian Fighters Cemetery'), Yarmouth
- Randall Cemetery, Freeport
- Riverside Cemetery, Yarmouth
- Skillings Cemetery, Gray
- South Gray Cemetery, Gray
- Walnut Hill Cemetery, North Yarmouth
- Webster Cemetery, Freeport
- Western Cemetery, Portland
- Woodlawn Cemetery, Westbrook

== Franklin County ==
- Evergreen Cemetery, Rangeley
- Nile Brook Cemetery, Rangeley
- Schoolhouse Cemetery, Rangeley
- Wilbur Gile Cemetery, Rangeley

== Hancock County ==
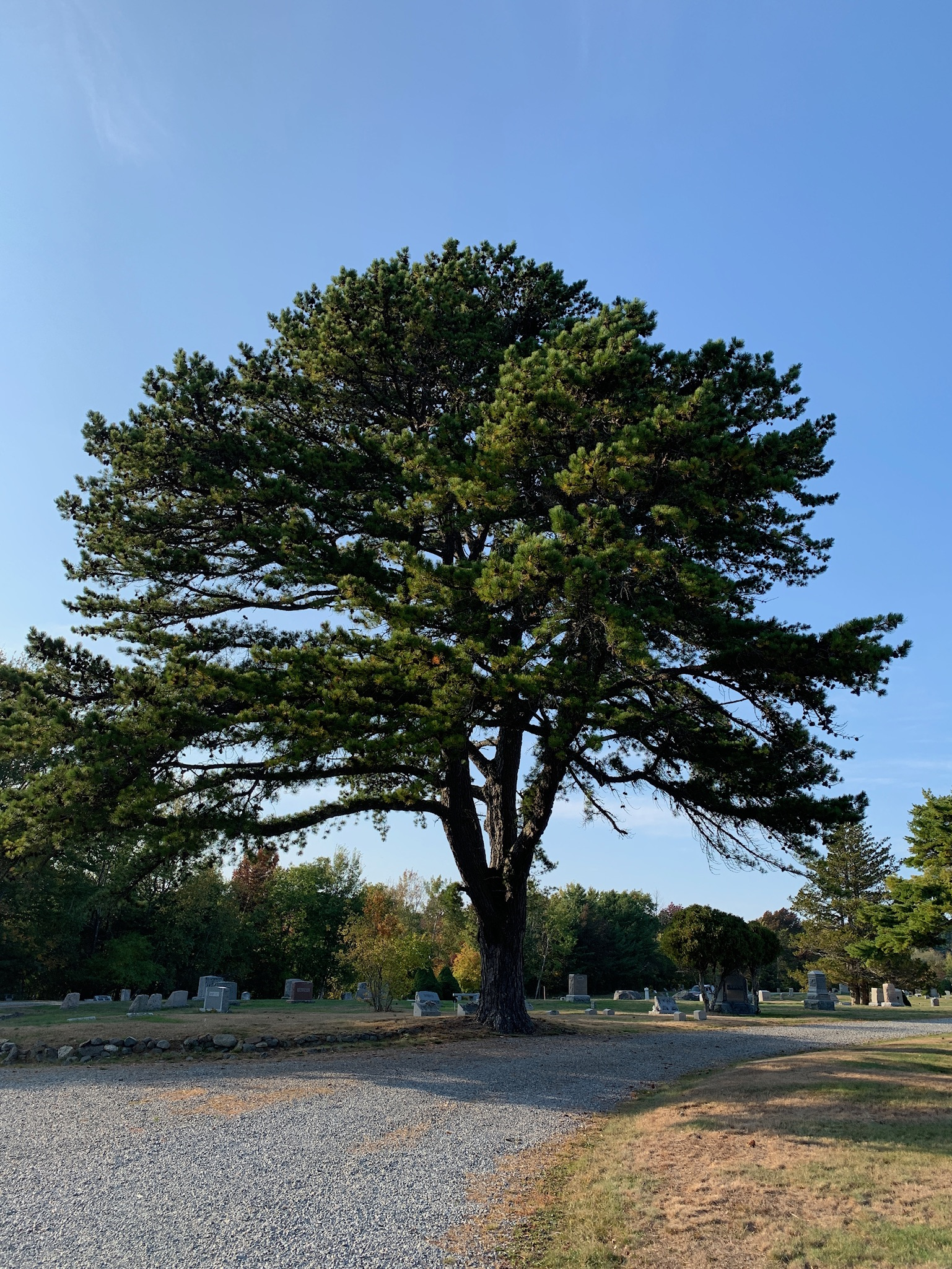
Ledgelawn Cemetery in Bar Harbor, Hancock County

- Ledgelawn Cemetery, Bar Harbor
- Woodbine Cemetery, Ellsworth

== Kennebec County ==
- Kent Burying Ground, Fayette; NRHP-listed
- Togus National Cemetery, Togus
- Wing Family Cemetery, Wayne; NRHP-listed

== Lincoln County ==
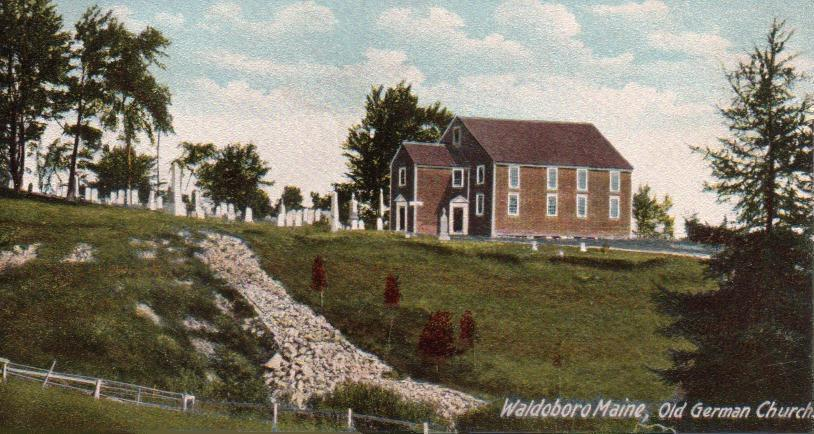
German Church and Cemetery in Waldoboro, Lincoln County

- Alden Chapman Cemetery, Damariscotta
- Avantaggio Cemetery, Damariscotta
- Benjamin Chapman Cemetery, Damariscotta
- Bethlehem Cemetery, Damariscotta
- Chapman-McAllister Cemetery, Damariscotta
- Chapman-Rollins Cemetery, Damariscotta
- Crowell and Margaret Hatch Cemetery, Newcastle
- Davis-Hunt Cemetery, Damariscotta
- Flint-Tufts Cemetery, Damariscotta
- German Church and Cemetery (or Old German Meeting House), Waldoboro; NRHP-listed
- Glidden Street Cemetery, Newcastle; burial place of Frances Perkins
- Heavner-Day Cemetery, Damariscotta
- Hillside Cemetery, Damariscotta
- House-Day Cemetery, Damariscotta
- Hussey Cemetery, Newcastle
- Knowlton-Russ Cemetery, Damariscotta
- Lessner Cemetery, Damariscotta
- Old Day Cemetery, Damariscotta
- Oliver Cemetery, Damariscotta
- Perry Cemetery, Damariscotta
- Pine Knoll Cemetery, Newcastle
- Plummer Cemetery, Damariscotta
- Sidelinger Cemetery, Damariscotta
- St. Denis Catholic Church, North Whitefield; NRHP-listed
- Sheepscot Cemetery, Newcastle
- Walpole Cemetery, Damariscotta
- Whitehouse Cemetery, Newcastle

== Oxford County ==
- Lakeside Cemetery, Bryant Pond; NRHP-listed
- Oxford Congregational Church and Cemetery, Oxford; NRHP-listed

== Penobscot County ==
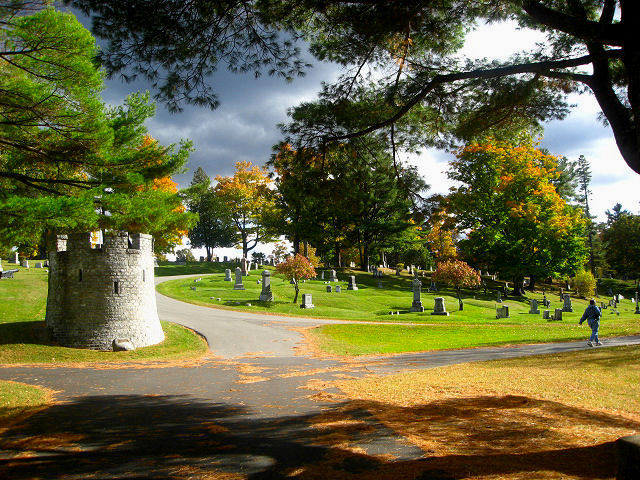
Mount Hope Cemetery in Bangor, Penobscot County

- Mount Hope Cemetery, Bangor; NRHP-listed
- Mount Pleasant Cemetery, Bangor

== Sagadahoc County ==
- Calvary Cemetery, Bath
- Fairview Cemetery, Bath
- First Baptist Church of Bowdoin and Coombs Cemetery, Bowdin; NRHP-listed
- Maple Grove Cemetery, Bath
- Oak Grove Cemetery, Bath
- Sewall Cemetery, Bath
- Trufant Burial Grounds, Bath

== Waldo County ==
- Free Will Baptist Church and Cemetery, North Islesboro; NRHP-listed

== Washington County ==
- Acadia National Cemetery, Jonesboro

== York County ==
- First Parish Cemetery, York
- Laurel Hill Cemetery, Saco
- Rendezvous Point Burying Ground, Saco; NRHP-listed
- Mitchell-Hatch Cemetery, Kennebunk

== See also ==
- List of cemeteries in the United States
- National Register of Historic Places listings in Maine
