= Louis B. Costello =

Maine newspaper publisher and banker (1876–1959)

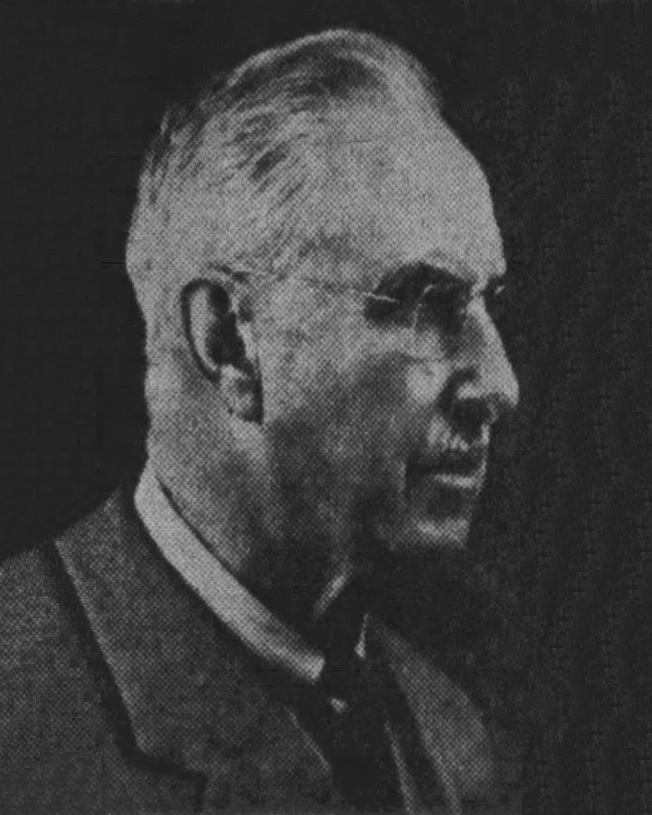
- Portrait of Costello, c. 1950s
- Born: Louis Bartlett Costello; September 14, 1876; Wells, Maine, U.S.
- Died: May 6, 1959 (aged 82); Lewiston, Maine, U.S.
- Burial place: Riverside Cemetery; 44°06′42.4″N 70°12′51.8″W
- Education: Bates College (BA)
- Occupations: Newspaper publisher; banker
- Title: President of the Lewiston Daily Sun company (1945–1959)
- Spouse: Sadie May Brackett (m. 1900; died 1957)
- Children: 2

Louis Bartlett Costello (September 14, 1876 – May 6, 1959) was an American newspaper publisher and banker who served as general manager and then president of The Lewiston Daily Sun and Lewiston Evening Journal in Lewiston, Maine. He began his career in journalism while still a student at Bates College and, by the end of his life, was a leading press figure in the state.

For nearly a half century, Costello was one of the most prominent members of the Lewiston-Auburn community. In addition to running its largest morning and afternoon papers, he was a longtime trustee of both Bates College and the Androscoggin County Savings Bank, serving as the latter institution's president from 1931 to 1939. He was an active Freemason and member of the United Baptist church.

== Early life and education ==
Costello was born in Wells, Maine on September 14, 1876. His father was Nicholas H. Costello (c. 1842–1885), a sea captain who drowned when Costello and his sister were young. In 1889, his mother, Annie Hill Costello (1842–1927) remarried William S. Wells, a prominent York County lumberman who later served in the Maine House of Representatives.

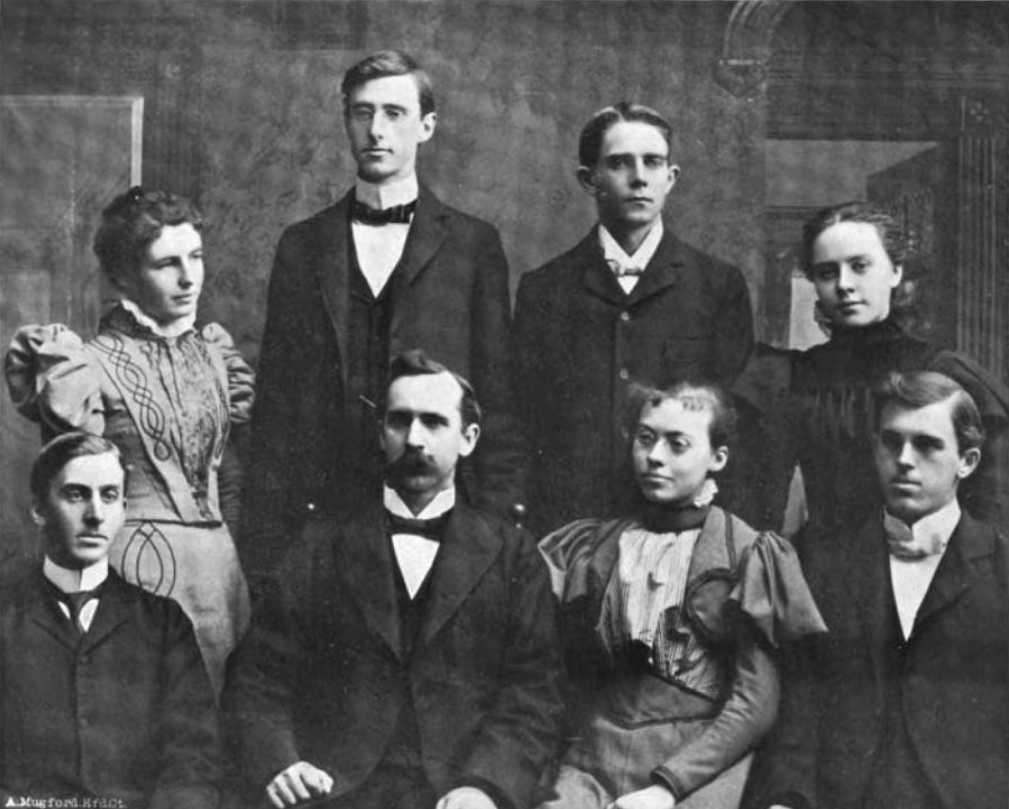
Board of The Bates Student in 1897, with business manager Costello second from left in the top row; Costello's future wife, Sadie Brackett, is second from right in the bottom row.

Costello attended Berwick Academy and gave an oration at the school's 1894 class day. Thereafter he attended Bates College, where he was elected president of his senior class. He and Sadie Brackett, a fellow member of the class of 1898, wrote for The Bates Student. He was also a competitive debater and, after graduation, would participate in organizing a chapter of Delta Sigma Rho on Bates' campus. Costello and Brackett married in Lewiston on February 14, 1900 and had two children, Louise (b. 1902) and Russell (b. 1904).

== Career ==
=== Newspapers ===
In 1898, Lewiston publisher George W. Wood purchased the five-year old Lewiston Daily Sun, merging it with his weekly Maine Statesman, and hired Costello as the paper's business manager. Thanks largely to the arrival of Rural Free Delivery in the region, which allowed for wider distribution within the Lewiston-Auburn city and town area, circulation increased from around 2,000 copies per day to 8,000 over the following two decades. In 1926, Wood acquired the Lewiston Evening Journal and promoted Costello to treasurer and general manager of the papers' publishing company. Costello served in this position until Wood's death in 1945, when he took over as owner and president. By this time, the Sun and Journal were the fourth and fifth most-read dailies in the state with circulations of 27,480 and 14,088, respectively.

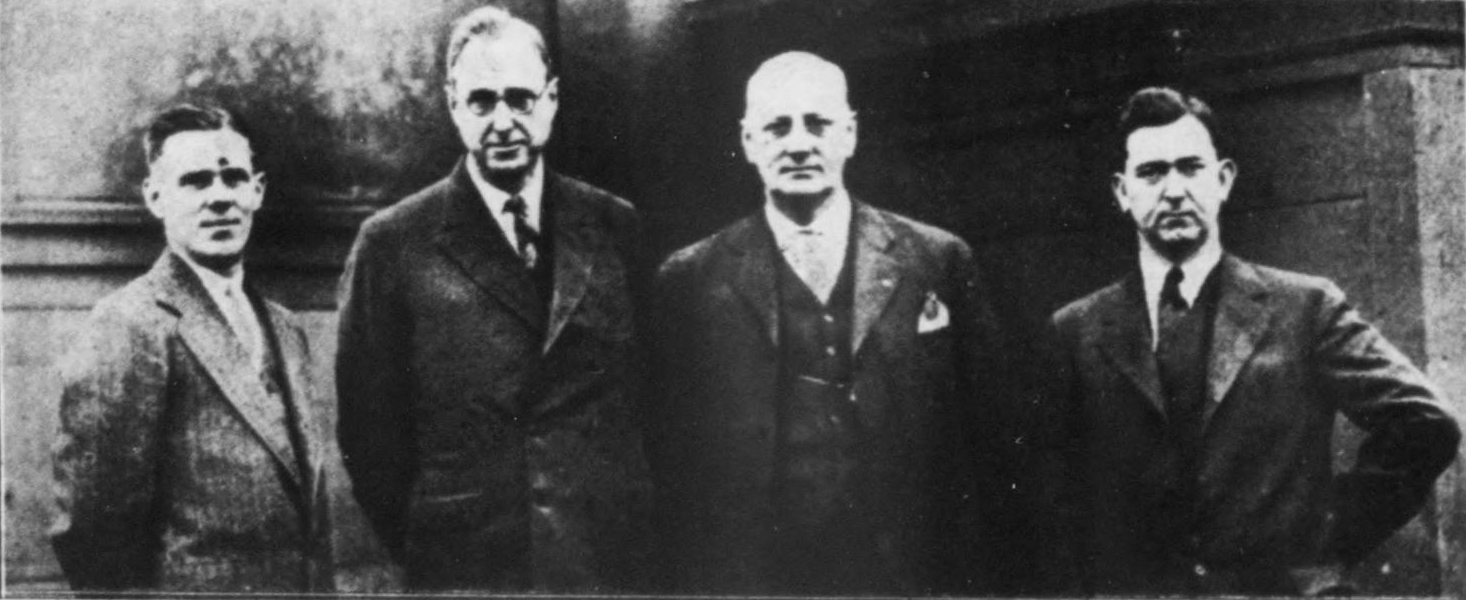
Maine Daily Newspaper Publishers Association officers in 1928. President Costello is second from left.

Costello was generally conservative in his management style. He took interest in new technological developments, investing in a trained photography department in the 1930s, but strongly resisted the growth of non-print media, going as far as firing his general manager, Frank S. Hoy, when Hoy purchased the license for radio station WLAM without permission. Though the Sun grew during an era of political domination by the Maine Republican Party and historically embraced an "independent Republican" label, Costello stressed the importance of journalistic objectivity to those who worked under him. His papers gained a reputation for being socially progressive but not so much as to alienate readers averse to change. Writing under the headline "A Leaf Out of My Notebook," he shared with Sun readers reports of his and Sadie's cross-country travels. All the while, he remained devoted to his home state, with editorials focused on portraying local communities in a positive light. During his tenure, he served for a time as president of the Maine Daily Newspaper Publishers Association and of the Maine Members of the Associated Press.

=== Banking ===
Costello was named a trustee of Androscoggin County Savings Bank in 1916 and remained on the board until 1956. Androscoggin was the largest savings bank by assets held centered in Lewiston and one of the largest in the state. In 1931, Costello was elected president of the bank when incumbent William J. Crawshaw resigned due to ill health. He served in this position for eight years, seeing it through the Great Depression, including its accepting of Emergency Banking Act aid in 1933.

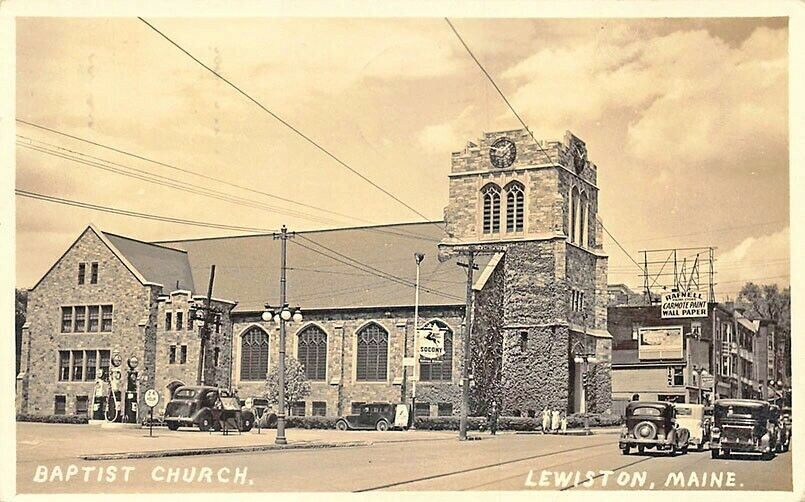
1930s postcard featuring Lewiston United Baptist Church, where Costello was a member for four decades

=== Civic life ===
Costello was a United Baptist, a designation common among Maine members of the Northern Baptist Convention into the twentieth century. He was a founding member of the Lewiston United Baptist Church. In the early 1920s, he served on the building committee for that congregation's now-demolished English Gothic home at the corner of Bates and Main streets, where Sadie taught religious school for many years. In 1932, he was named second vice president of the Maine United Baptist Convention; that year, convention delegates passed resolutions praising the United States' involvement in the World Disarmament Conference and opposing repeal of the Eighteenth Amendment to the United States Constitution.

He was also a Freemason, having served as a past master of Rabboni Lodge No. 150 and as a member of the Knights Templar fraternal order.

== Later life and death ==
On June 15, 1952, in recognition of his achievements, including more than 30 years of service on Bates College's board of trustees, Costello was awarded an honorary Doctor of Laws degree by university president Charles Phillips. Other recipients honored at the ceremony were New Jersey Governor Alfred E. Driscoll, financier Frank Altschul, filmmaker Louis de Rochemont, and clergyman Daniel A. Poling.

After a period of prolonged illness, Costello died at Central Maine General Hospital on May 6, 1959. Following services at the Bates College chapel, he was buried in Riverside Cemetery, alongside his wife, who preceded him in death two years earlier. In his will, he left $5,000 each (equivalent to $55,223 in 2025) to Bates and the Lewiston United Baptist Church. As a result, the Costello Room in Bates' Chase Hall was named in his honor.

His son, Russell, succeeded him as president of the Daily Sun company and oversaw the merger of The Sun and Evening Journal into the Sun Journal in 1989. Russell passed the presidency of the paper on to his son, James, upon his own death in 1993. In 2017, the Costellos announced the sale of the Sun Journal to MaineToday Media owner Reade Brower.

The Costello family home at 45 Campus Avenue, designed by architect Harry S. Coombs, was purchased by Bates College and provided office and student organization space for a number of years before being torn down in 2014. The site is currently occupied by the school's Bonney Science Center.

== See also ==
- List of Bates College people
