= Acadia National Cemetery =

Veterans cemetery in Washington County, Maine

- Interactive map of Acadia National Cemetery

Details
- Established: 2020
- Location: Jonesboro, Maine
- Country: United States
- Coordinates: 44°38′47″N 67°39′42″W
- Type: United States National Cemetery
- Size: 6.2 acres (2.5 ha)
- Find a Grave: Acadia National Cemetery

Acadia National Cemetery is a 6.2 acre Department of Veteran Affairs (VA) national cemetery located in Washington County, Maine. The cemetery will serve the burial needs of veterans, their spouses and eligible family members.

== History and location ==
On September 27, 2017, the land at 1799 U. S. Route 1, Jonesboro, Maine was donated to the VA by Worcester Holdings, LLC. Worcester Holdings, LLC was founded by Morrill and Karen Worcester, who also run the nonprofit group Wreaths Across America.

This cemetery will be the second national cemetery in Maine and is part of the VA National Cemetery Administration Rural Initiative to provide access to VA burial benefits for Veterans who reside rural areas and who have not previously had reasonable access to a national or state Veterans cemetery. Togus National Cemetery in Chelsea, Maine, is the only other VA national cemetery in the state and is currently closed to new interments.

A contract to build the cemetery was awarded in August 2018 and is expected to be completed in early 2020. The first phase of cemetery development will offer more than 1,400 casket and cremation spaces. The cemetery will provide burials for caskets, in-ground and columbarium burials for cremations, as well as a memorial wall for remains that are unrecoverable or identified, were buried at sea, donated to science or cremated and remains scattered. The cemetery will have a capacity of 7,086 gravesites when fully constructed.

== See also ==
- List of cemeteries in Maine
