= Granite Store =

Granite Store, or variants thereof, may refer to:

in the United States

- Granite Store (Sullivan, Maine), listed on the National Register of Historic Places in Hancock County, Maine
- Granite Store (Uxbridge, Massachusetts), listed on the National Register of Historic Places

== See also ==
- Granite Building (disambiguation)
