= Sherman's Maine Coast Book Shops =

American bookshop chain

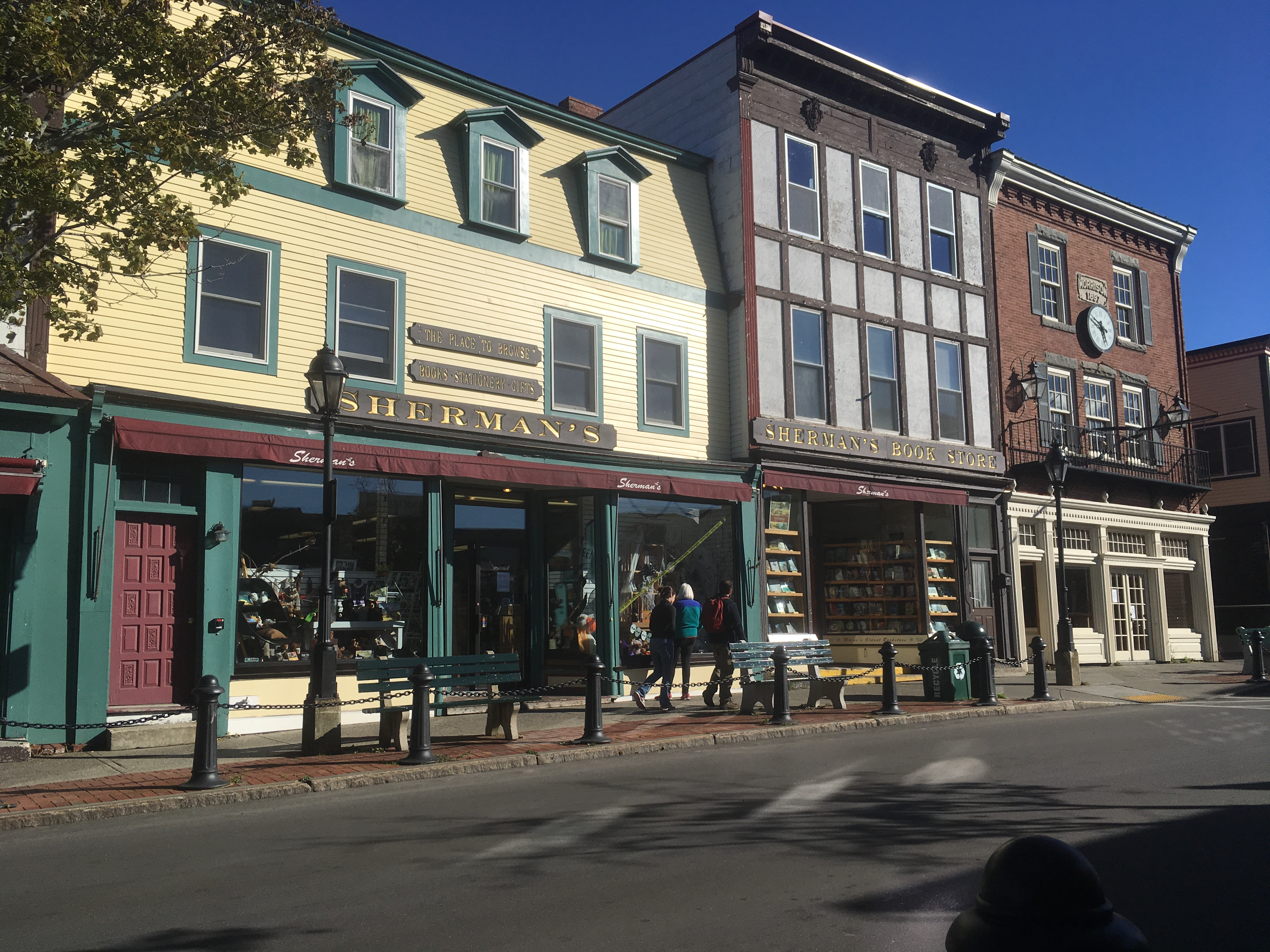
- The flagship store, Bar Harbor, Maine (2017)
- Company type: Private
- Industry: Retail; Bookshop
- Founded: Bar Harbor, Maine, U.S. 1886 (140 years ago)
- Founder: William Henry Sherman
- Number of locations: 9 shops (December 2022)
- Key people: Jeff Curtis (chief executive officer, co-owner); Maria Boord Curtis (director of operations, co-owner)
- Products: Books, stationery
- Website: www.shermans.com

Sherman's Maine Coast Book Shops (formerly Sherman's Book Store) is a book and stationery retailer operating in Maine, United States. It is the oldest bookstore in the state, having been established in 1886, and is one of the ten oldest bookstores in the United States.

The chain's flagship store is on Main Street in Bar Harbor, opened by William Henry Sherman. That store remains open, and as of 2022, eight other stores are in operation. They are located in Damariscotta, Boothbay Harbor, Freeport, Rockland, Topsham, Windham, Falmouth and Portland. A store in Camden opened in 2004, but closed in 2020 due to the COVID-19 pandemic in the United States.

== History ==
In 1866, William Henry Sherman, a native of Sullivan, Maine, established a printing press, W. H. Sherman, Printer & Stationer, in Bar Harbor. It printed the town's newspaper, the Bar Harbor Times, as well as his own works and that of some of Bar Harbor's year-round and summer residents.

At the turn of the century, when the books and stationery branch of the business was the emphasis, Sherman's four daughters began running the company.

William Sherman died in 1928, aged 62.

The quartet sold the business to the Curtis family in 1962. A third generation of the family became involved in the business in 2013.

In 2016, the company changed its name to Sherman's Maine Coast Book Shops after purchasing Maine Coast Books in Damariscotta.

In April 2025, it was announced that a tenth location will open in Saco, Maine, by Memorial Day.

== See also ==
- List of bookstore chains
