= John Preston (Medal of Honor) =

Union Navy sailor in the American Civil War (1841–1885)

- Born: 1841; Ireland
- Died: May 26, 1885 (aged 43–44)
- Burial place: Togus National Cemetery, Togus, Maine
- Military career
- Allegiance: United States
- Branch: United States Navy
- Service years: 1862–1864
- Rank: Landsman
- Unit: USS Oneida
- Conflicts: American Civil War • Battle of Mobile Bay
- Awards: Medal of Honor

John Preston (1841 – 26 May 1885) was a Union Navy sailor in the American Civil War and a recipient of the U.S. military's highest decoration, the Medal of Honor, for his actions at the Battle of Mobile Bay.

Preston was born in 1841 in Ireland. He joined the US Navy from Boston in February 1862, and served during the Civil War as a landsman on the USS Oneida. At the Battle of Mobile Bay on August 5, 1864, he was severely wounded in the eyes but continued at his post manning an artillery gun and later helped care for other wounded sailors. For this action, he was awarded the Medal of Honor four months later, on December 31, 1864. He was discharged for disability in October 1864 as the result of his wounds.

Preston's official Medal of Honor citation reads:

Served on board the U.S.S. Oneida in the engagement at Mobile Bay, 5 August 1864. Severely wounded, Preston remained at his gun throughout the engagement which resulted in the capture of the rebel ram Tennessee and the damaging of Fort Morgan, carrying on until obliged to go to the surgeon to whom he reported himself as "only slightly injured." He then assisted in taking care of the wounded below and wanted to be allowed to return to his battle station on deck. Upon close examination it was found that he was wounded quite severely in both eyes.
