= David John Scannell =

United States Marine Corps Medal of Honor recipient

- Born: March 30, 1875; Boston, Massachusetts, U.S.
- Died: May 7, 1923 (aged 48); Togus, Maine, U.S.
- Burial place: Togus National Cemetery, Chelsea, Maine
- Military career
- Allegiance: United States
- Branch: Marine Corps
- Service years: 1898–1903
- Rank: Private
- Conflicts: Boxer Rebellion
- Awards: Medal of Honor

David John Scannell (March 30, 1875 – May 7, 1923) was a United States Marine and a recipient of the U.S. military's highest decoration, the Medal of Honor, for his actions during the Boxer Rebellion.

== Biography ==
A native of Boston, Massachusetts, Scannell enlisted in the Marine Corps from that city on February 1, 1898, and served as a private. In Beijing (then known to Americans as Peking), China, from July 21 to August 17, 1900, he helped erect barricades despite heavy hostile fire. One year later, on July 19, 1901, he was awarded the Medal of Honor for this action.

Scannell was discharged from the Marine Corps on March 6, 1903, after five years of service. He died two decades later, at age 48, and was buried at Togus National Cemetery in Chelsea, Maine. Scannell's grave is distinguished by a special marker with gold engraving.

== Medal of Honor citation ==
His official citation reads:

In the presence of the enemy during the action at Peking, China, 21 July to 17 August 1900. Throughout this period, Scannell distinguished himself by meritorious conduct.

== See also ==
- List of Medal of Honor recipients for the Boxer Rebellion
