= Old Settlers Cemetery =

Old Settlers Cemetery may refer to:

- Old Settlers Cemetery (also known as Thrasher Cemetery), in the grounds of Southern Maine Community College, South Portland, Maine, United States
- Old Settlers' Cemetery (Charlotte, North Carolina), United States
