= Togus VA Medical Center =

US VA Medical Center in Kennebec County, Maine

Coordinates: 44°16′28″N 69°42′11″W

- Veterans Health Administration
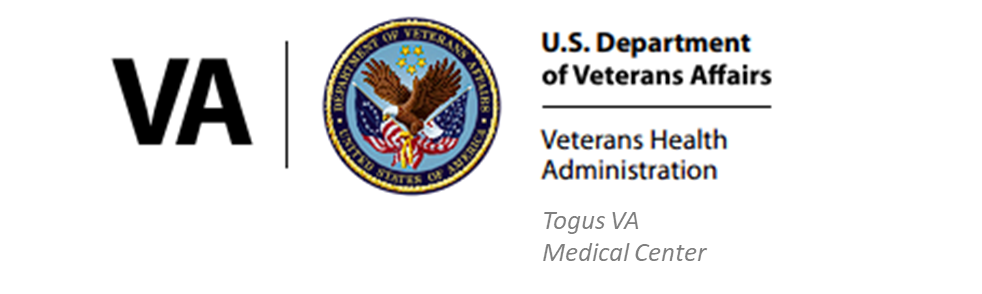

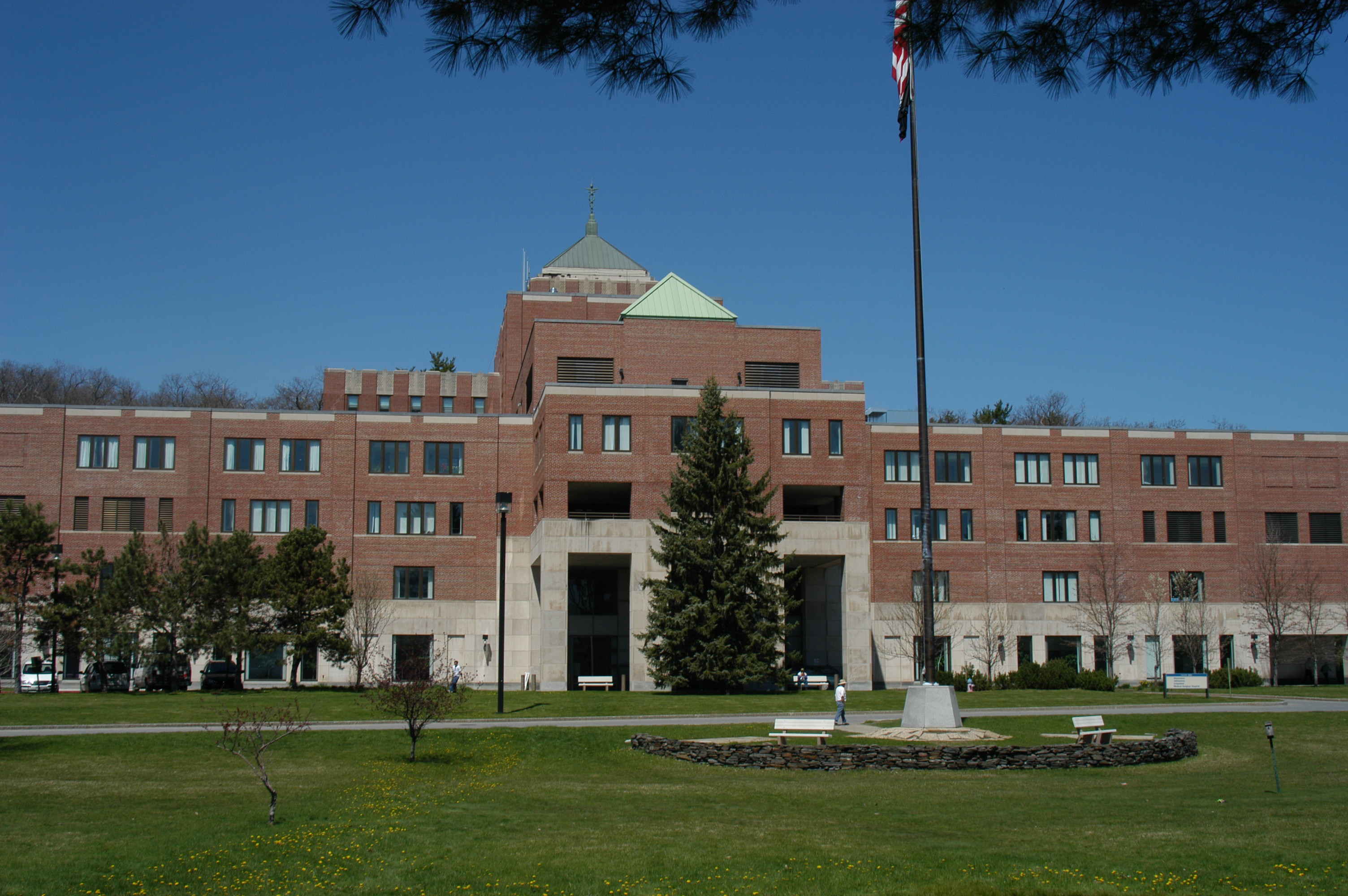

Geography
- Location: Chelsea, Maine, United States

Organization
- Care system: Veterans Health Administration
- Type: General
- Network: VA Maine Healthcare System

Services
- Emergency department: Basic; Non Trauma
- Beds: 67

History
- Opened: 1930

Links
- Website: VA Maine Healthcare System
- Lists: Hospitals in Maine

Togus VA Medical Center is a facility operated by the United States Department of Veterans Affairs in Chelsea, Maine. The facility was built as a resort hotel, and housed Union veterans of the American Civil War prior to being converted to a veterans hospital. It was the first veterans facility developed by the United States government.

== Togus Springs Hotel ==
Springs on the site were originally described by Native Americans as "worromontogus" (sometimes translated as "place of the mineral spring"). The 134-room Togus Springs Hotel was built on the site in 1858 by Rockland granite dealer Horace Beals. Beals constructed a stable, large pool, bathing house, race track, and bowling alley on the site in an effort to duplicate the success of the Poland Spring Hotel. Beal's investment of one-quarter-million dollars failed to attract the anticipated number of visitors, and the facility closed when receipts failed to cover expenses.

== Soldiers' home ==
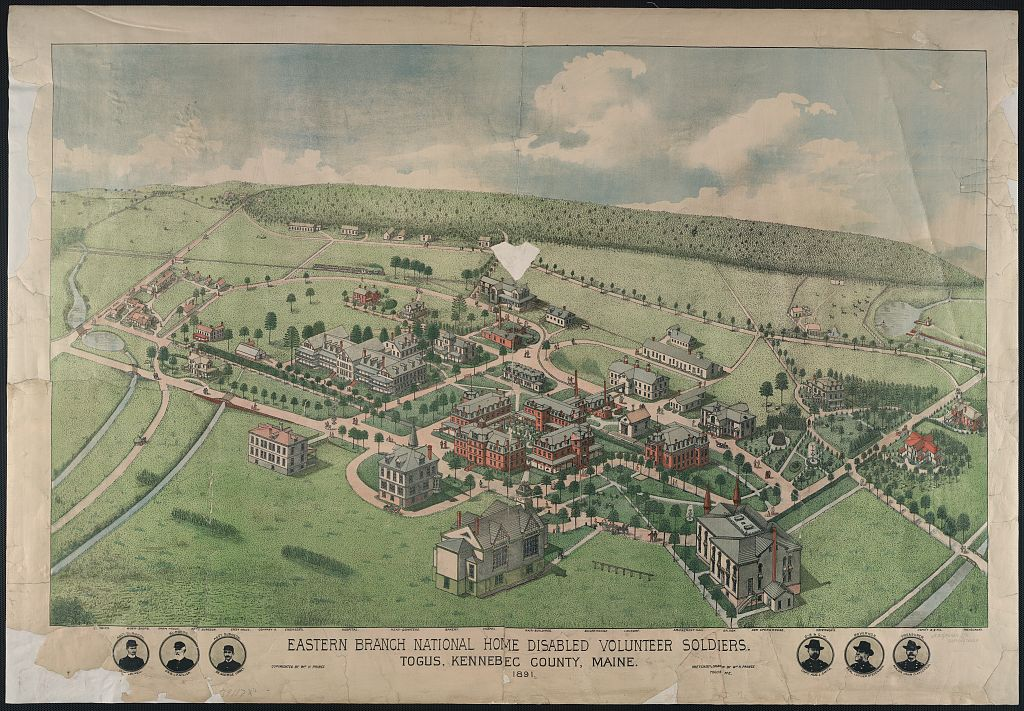
1891 poster of the Eastern Branch of the National Home for Disabled Volunteer Soldiers

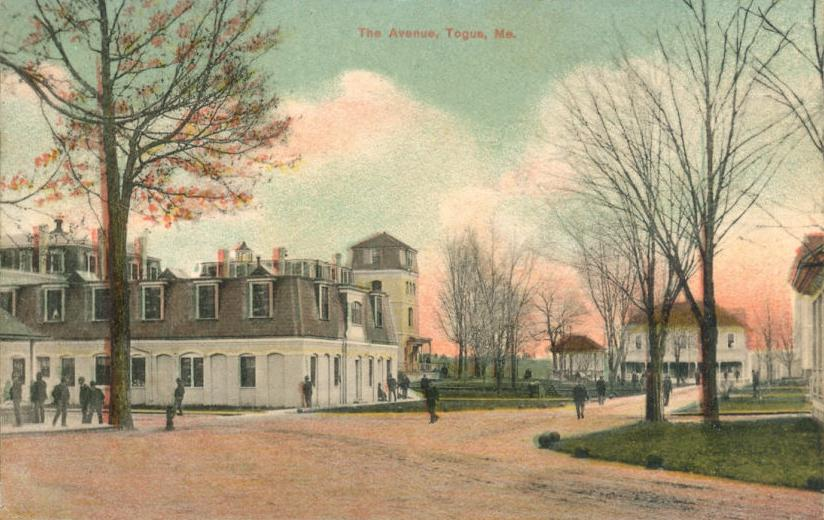
Togus in c. 1906

The hotel was purchased by the federal government for US$50,000 in 1866. Togus began operations on October 6, 1866 as the Eastern Branch of the National Asylum For Disabled Volunteer Soldiers. The first veteran admitted was James P. Nickerson of Company A, 19th Massachusetts Volunteers. Two hundred veterans were living at Togus during the summer of 1867, and a new barracks, hospital, and chapel were under construction. A fire in a main building on January 7, 1868, displaced 270 residents. Three 3-story brick dormitories and an amusement hall recreation building were built in 1868. Togus resembled a military establishment where the men wore surplus blue army uniforms and were subject to military discipline including confinement in the guardhouse for infractions of the rules. The residents signed over their federal pension in return for their care.

Those who were able to work could earn money working at the shops or farms raising much of the food consumed at Togus. Three Holstein dairy cattle were imported from the Netherlands in 1871 to form the first registered herd of the breed in Maine. In 1872 the name was changed to the National Home for Disabled Volunteer Soldiers. New buildings included a bakery, a butcher shop, a blacksmith shop, a brickyard, a boot and shoe factory, a carpentry shop, a fire station, a harness shop, a library, a sawmill, a soap works, a store, and an opera house theatre. President Ulysses S. Grant visited Togus on August 13, 1873 to review the men who had served with him during the Civil War. There were 933 men living at Togus in 1878. Most were Civil War veterans, but some had served in the Mexican–American War or the War of 1812.

The narrow-gauge Kennebec Central Railroad offered transportation to Gardiner beginning on July 23, 1890. The interurban Augusta and Togus Electric Railway offered transportation to Augusta beginning on June 15, 1901. The number of veterans living at Togus peaked in 1904 at just under 2800. Most men lived in dormitories, but some resided in small cottages they constructed on the grounds. The men in cottages drew their rations from the commissary and cooked their own meals. Grand Army of the Republic post Cutler No. 48 was based at Togus and named for major Nathan Cutler. Togus became a popular recreation center for civilians from the surrounding area. Large crowds arrived on weekends to observe baseball games, military band concerts, opera house performances, and a zoo including antelope, bear, buffalo, deer, elk, chimpanzees, and pheasants. Special military ceremonies were held on Memorial Day, Flag Day, and Independence Day.

== Veterans Administration hospital ==
Additional buildings were constructed to convert the site to a Veterans Administration hospital. The facilities, along with the adjacent Togus National Cemetery, were listed on the National Register of Historic Places in 2012. The Governor's House, the oldest building in the complex and the oldest veteran-related facility in the country, was designated a National Historic Landmark in 1973.

On July 8, 2010 a veteran, with ongoing health issues, had an armed confrontation with police and a Maine game warden in a wooded area of the campus after calls were placed to authorities regarding gunshots. The veteran was shot and killed by police.

== See also ==
- Togus National Cemetery
- National Register of Historic Places listings in Kennebec County, Maine
