= Riverside Cemetery (Lewiston, Maine) =

Cemetery in Androscoggin County, Maine, USA

- Interactive map of Riverside Cemetery

Details
- Location: Lewiston, Maine
- Country: United States
- Coordinates: 44°06′37″N 70°12′52″W
- Owned by: Riverside Cemetery Association
- Size: 40 acres (16 ha)
- No. of graves: >9,000
- Find a Grave: Riverside Cemetery

Riverside Cemetery is a cemetery in Lewiston, Maine. The 40-acre (16 ha) property is located on the bank of the Androscoggin River. It is owned by the Riverside Cemetery Association.

Riverside Cemetery was incorporated in 1855 after the land was purchased by the city from the Maine State Seminary (now Bates College). The property included the Greenwood Cemetery, which had been in use since the 1830s, as well as farmland owned by the Whipple family. The founders of the cemetery are listed as William P. Frye, Alonzo Garcelon, Amos Nevins, Daniel Hamilton, Samuel Bearce, Armis Nash, Samuel Haley, and Donald Holland. The earliest recorded burial was Dean Frye, Esq., in 1834.

Many notable people are buried at Riverside, including 24 mayors, 2 governors, a Civil War general, a senator, and more than 1,200 veterans dating back to the Revolutionary War. Various walking tours of the cemetery highlight the lives of those who are buried on the grounds.

The cemetery was originally designed as a rural cemetery similar to Mount Auburn in Cambridge, Massachusetts. Later development focused on symmetrical organization of lots, as well as the construction of obelisks, mausoleums, and a statuary.

The diversity of bird species and the adjacent Androscoggin Riverside trail make the cemetery a popular destination with birdwatchers, joggers, and walkers.

== Notable interments ==
- Louis J. Brann (1876–1948), Maine governor
- William "Rough Bill" Carrigan (1883–1969), Major League Baseball player and manager
- Oren B. Cheney (1816–1903), politician, minister, statesman, and founder of Bates College
- Louis B. Costello (1876–1959), banker and publisher
- Thomas Amory Deblois Fessenden (1826–1868), US Congressman
- William P. Frye (1830–1911), US Senator
- Alonzo Garcelon (1813–1906), Maine governor
- George W. Leland (1834–1880), American Civil War Medal of Honor recipient

== See also ==
- List of cemeteries in Maine
