= Granite Building =

Granite Building may refer to:

- Granite Building (Denver), a Denver Landmark
- Granite Mansion, Newark, Delaware, NRHP-listed
- Granite Building (New York City), associated with Alexander S. Wolcott
- Granite Building (Rochester, New York), NRHP-listed
- Granite Apartments, Anaconda, Montana, NRHP-listed
- Granite County Jail, Philipsburg Montana, NRHP-listed
- Granite Hill Farmstead, Danville, Kentucky, NRHP-listed
- Granite LDS Ward Chapel-Avard Fairbanks Studio, Sandy, Utah, NRHP-listed
- Granite Lumber Company Building, Salt Lake City, Utah, NRHP-listed
- Granite Paper Mill, Salt Lake City, Utah, NRHP-listed
- Granite Park Chalet, West Glacier, Montana, NRHP-listed
- Granite Trust Company, Quincy, Massachusetts, NRHP-listed
- Jones Brothers Granite Shed, Barre, Vermont, NRHP-listed
- E.L. Smith Roundhouse Granite Shed, Barre, Vermont, NRHP-listed

== See also ==
- Granite Store (disambiguation)
