= Genevieve Fox =

American writer (1888–1959)

- Born: 1888; Southampton, Massachusetts, U.S.
- Died: October 5, 1959 (aged 70–71); Bar Harbor, Maine, U.S.
- Resting place: Ledgelawn Cemetery, Bar Harbor, Maine, U.S.
- Occupation: Author
- Spouse: Raymond Garfield Fuller
- Writing career
- Genre: Adventure fiction

Genevieve May Fox (1888 – October 5, 1959) was an American author, best known for her adventure books for girls that were written in the first half of the twentieth century.

== Life ==
She was born in Southampton, Massachusetts, and studied at Smith College, graduating in 1911. She developed an interest in labour relations and published at least one book on the subject. It was at this time that she appears to have met her future husband, Raymond Garfield Fuller, two years her senior, who was interested in the question of child labour. A journalist and sociologist, he published several papers on the subject and spoke at numerous conferences in the 1930s.

The couple lived at Eaton Center, New Hampshire, and later in New York City. It was in the thirties and forties that most of Genevieve Fox's fictional works were produced, beginning with Mountain Girl in 1932, and finishing with Bonnie, Island Girl, which appeared in 1951. Popular in their day, many were translated into other languages.

She died in Bar Harbor, Maine, a year before the passing of her husband. They are both buried in the town's Ledgelawn Cemetery.

== Works ==
=== Non-fiction ===
- The Industrial Awakening and the Young Women's Christian Association (1919), National Board of Young Women's Christian Associations. (See )
- When Labor Goes to School: A Story of the Worker's Educational Movement (1920), National Board of Young Women's Christian Associations.
- Sir Wilfred Grenfell (1942), illustrated by Mary Reardon. Published in German as Sonne über Labrador - Leben und Taten eines großen Mannes (1949)
- Army Surgeon (about William Beaumont, 1944), illustrations by Forrest W. Orr. Little, Brown

=== Juvenile fiction ===
- Mountain Girl (1932)
- Mountain Girl Comes Home (1934)
- Lona of Hollybush Creek (1935)
- Susan of the Green Mountains (1937), Little, Brown & Co., illustrations by Forrest W. Orr.
- Border Girl (1939), Little, Brown & Co.
- Green Treasure (1941), Little, Brown & Co. Published in Spanish as El tesoro verde (1945)
- Cynthia of Bee Tree Hollow (1948), Little, Brown & Co.
- Bonnie, Island Girl (1951), illustrated by Mary Morton Weissfeld, Little, Brown and Company.
