= William Henry Sherman =

American publisher and author

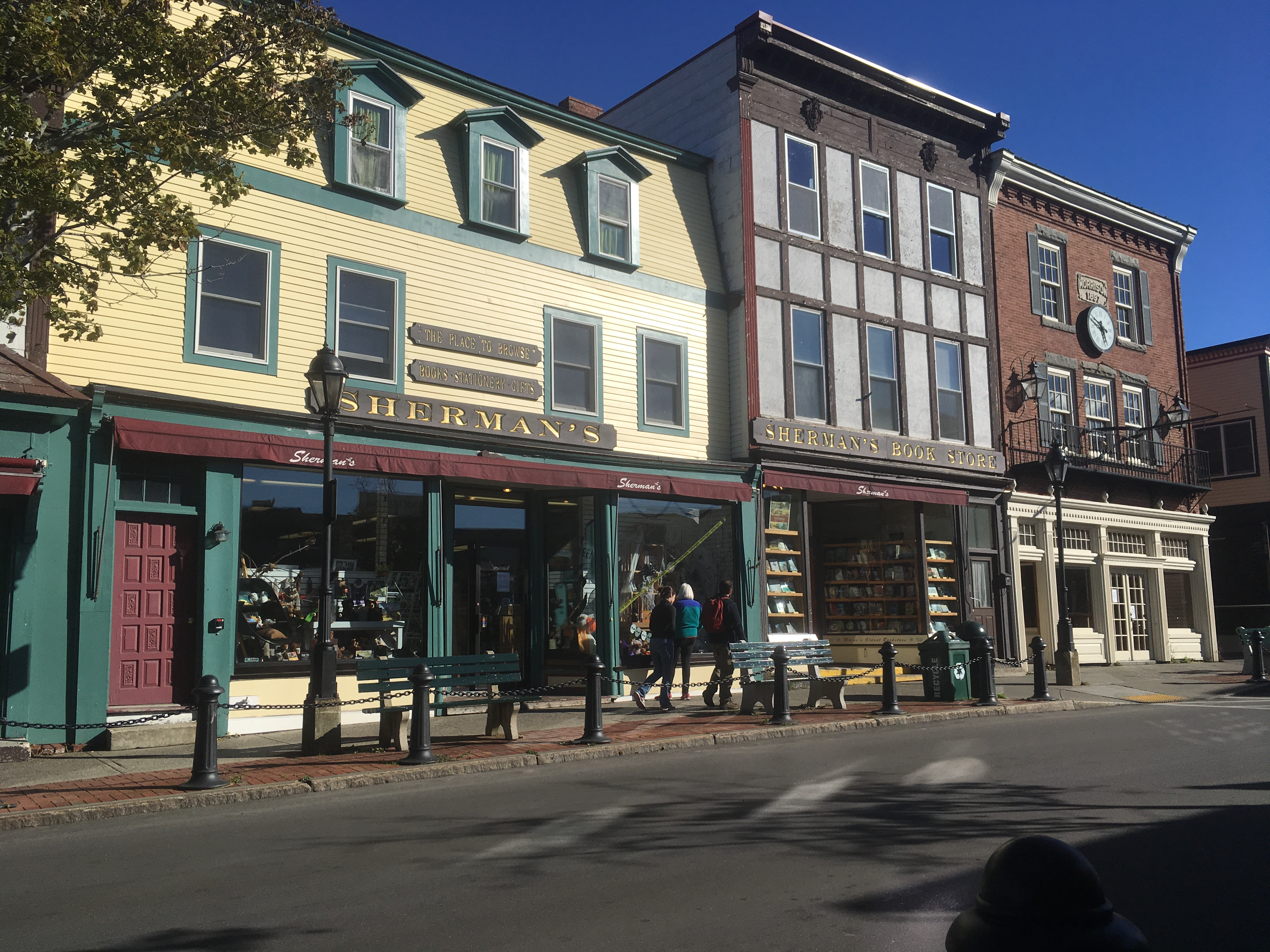
- Sherman's Book Store, Main Street, Bar Harbor, Maine (2017)
- Born: October 4, 1865; Sullivan, Maine, U.S.
- Died: May 18, 1928 (aged 62); Bar Harbor, Maine, U.S.
- Resting place: Ledgelawn Cemetery, Bar Harbor, Maine, U.S.
- Occupation(s): Printer, author

William Henry Sherman (October 4, 1865 – May 18, 1928) was an American businessman and writer. In 1886, he founded W. H. Sherman, Printer & Stationer, in Bar Harbor, Maine, which went on to become Sherman's Book Store. It is now the oldest bookstore in the state and one of the ten oldest bookstores in the United States.

== Life and career ==
Sherman was born in Sullivan, Maine, to Albion Sherman and Phebe French.

He began his career working for newspapers and the Associated Press as a reporter. After establishing W. H. Sherman, Printer & Stationer, in 1886, he began publishing the Bar Harbor Times in 1914, as well as his own works and that of some of Bar Harbor's year-round and summer residents.

Sherman published Guide to Bar Harbor, Maine, in 1890.

On October 23, 1890, he married Annie Smith, with whom he five daughters and one son. The family lived at 5 Roberts Avenue.

He became president of Bar Harbor Savings Bank, which merged with First National Bank in 1911. He remained director.

Sherman was a Freemason.

== Death ==
Sherman died in 1928, aged 62. He is interred in Bar Harbor's Ledgelawn Cemetery. His wife survived him by fifteen years, and was buried beside him.

== Publications ==
- Guide to Bar Harbor, Maine (1890)
