= Sun Journal (Maine) =

Newspaper published in Maine, United States

- Front page on April 4, 2007
- Type: Daily newspaper
- Format: Broadsheet
- Owner: Maine Trust for Local News (2023–present)
- Publisher: Jody Jalbert
- Editor: Judy Meyer
- Founded: May 20, 1847
- Headquarters: 64 Lisbon Street; Lewiston, Maine, U.S.
- Country: United States
- Circulation: 18,600 (as of 2017)
- OCLC number: 1058326012
- Website: sunjournal.com

The Sun Journal is a newspaper published in Lewiston, Maine, United States, which covers central and western Maine. In addition to its main office in Lewiston, the newspaper also maintains satellite news and sales bureaus in the Maine towns of Farmington, Norway and Rumford. It is the third largest daily newspaper by circulation in Maine.

Though its history dates back to 1847, the Sun Journal has existed in its current iteration since 1989, when Lewiston's two largest newspapers, the morning Lewiston Daily Sun and afternoon Lewiston Evening Journal were combined into one publication. Long owned and published by the Costello family, the newspaper was purchased by Reade Brower, owner of MaineToday Media, in 2017.

In August 2023, The National Trust for Local News completed its purchase of the newspaper and included it in a new non-profit group of newspapers in Maine called the Maine Trust for Local News. The group began to control some other publications previously controlled by Brower.

== History ==
The lineage of the Sun Journal can be traced back to May 20, 1847, when printer William Waldron and future Governor of Maine, Dr. Alonzo Garcelon founded Lewiston's first paper, a weekly called the Lewiston Falls Journal. In 1857, former employee Nelson Dingley Jr. became owner and publisher, and the paper entered into full-time daily publication in April 1861. It rebranded in 1866 as the Lewiston Evening Journal.

In 1893, The Lewiston Daily Sun emerged as a competitor and would, under the stewardship of George W. Wood, became the leading morning daily in the region. The two papers maintained a fierce rivalry until Wood purchased the Journal from the Dingley family on February 1, 1926, moving production from the Dingley Building to The Sun's facility at 104 Park Street in Lewiston. By 1945, when Wood died, the Sun and Journal were the fourth and fifth most-read dailies in the state with circulations of 27,480 and 14,088, respectively.

Wood's heir was Louis B. Costello, who began as The Sun's business manager in 1898 and was promoted to general manager and treasurer of the papers' publishing company in 1926. He, in turn, left the papers to his son Russell, who, in 1989, combined the two papers form the Sun Journal. In 2017, the Sun Media Group was sold by the Costello family to Reade Brower, owner of MaineToday Media.

The Sun Journal began publishing its Monday paper online-only March 2, 2020, along with three other Maine Dailies owned by MaineToday Media.

Starting in April 2025, the paper will be printed five days a week instead of six and will be delivered by mail via U.S. Postal Service instead of newspaper carriers.

== Prices ==
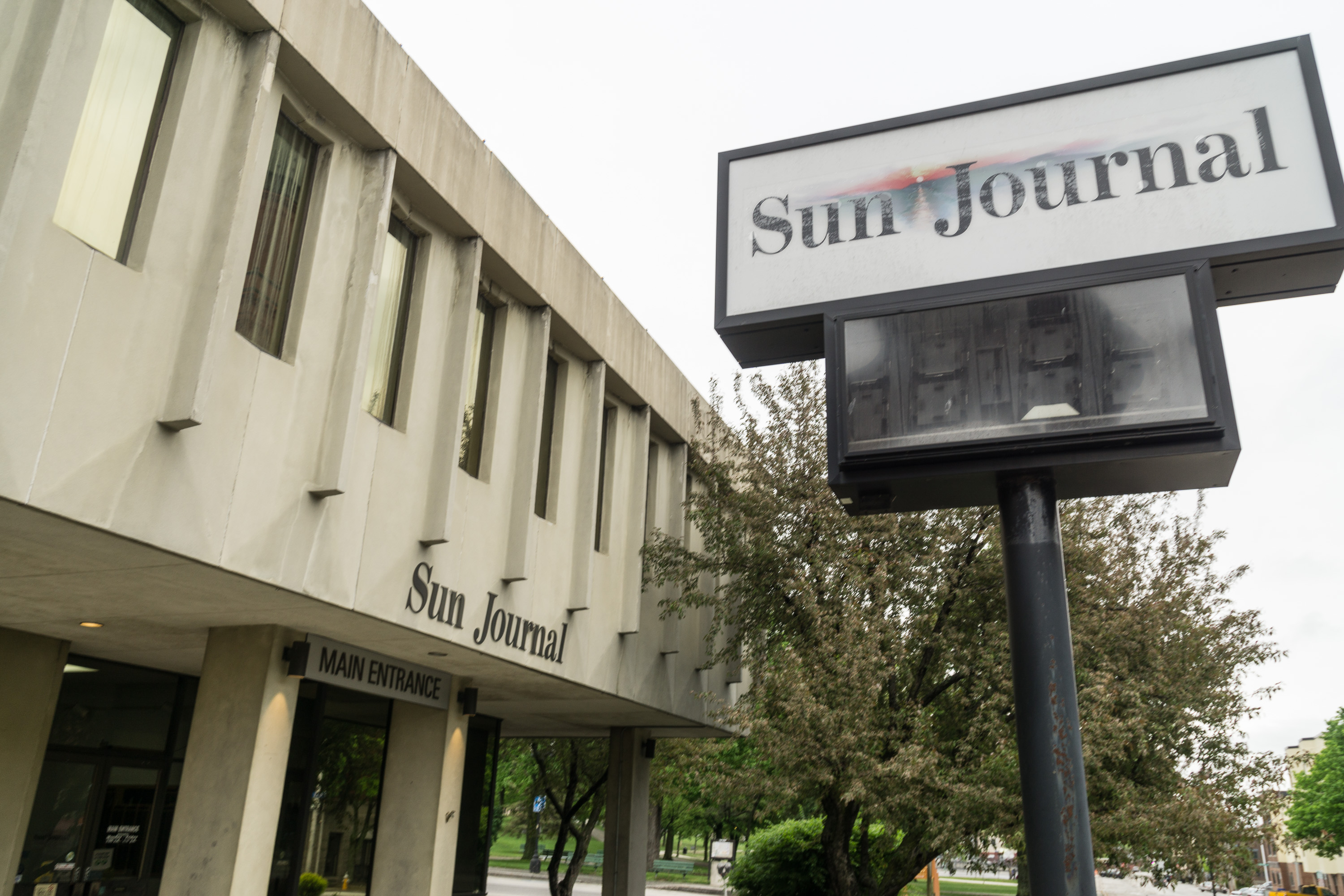
The Sun-Journal office at 104 Park Street

The Sun Journal prices are: $2 daily, $3 Sunday.

== Sister weeklies ==
On October 1, 2007, the Sun Journal purchased Kirkland Newspapers of Farmington, the publisher of four weekly newspapers:

- The Franklin Journal of Farmington (4,500 twice-weekly circulation)
- The Rangeley Highlander of Rangeley (2,300 biweekly)
- The Penobscot Times of Old Town (3,300 weekly)
- Livermore Falls Advertiser of Livermore Falls (2,300 weekly)

The Sun Journal also owns The Forecaster, a free regional paper.

The Advertiser Democrat, Bethel Citizen, and Rumford Falls Times (weeklies) are published by the Sun Journal as well.
