= The Lewiston Daily Sun =

Defunct newspaper

- Front page on May 31, 1989
- Type: Daily newspaper
- Format: Broadsheet
- Founded: February 20, 1893
- Ceased publication: June 3, 1989
- Headquarters: 104 Park Street; Lewiston, Maine, U.S.
- Country: United States
- OCLC number: 9248627

The Lewiston Daily Sun was a newspaper published in Lewiston, Maine. Established in 1893, it became the dominant morning daily in the Lewiston-Auburn city and town area. In 1926, its publisher acquired the Lewiston Evening Journal and published the two papers until they merged into the Sun Journal in 1989.

== History ==
Henry Wing founded The Lewiston Daily Sun on February 20, 1893. Hoping to compete with the Republican-leaning Lewiston Evening Journal, it proclaimed itself in its first issue as "the only Democratic daily paper published in central Maine." Five years later, it was purchased by George W. Wood, who merged the paper with his weekly Maine Statesman and changed its editorial stance. In its first two decades, circulation quadrupled from 2,000 copies per day to 8,000, thanks largely to the arrival of Rural Free Delivery in the region.

In 1926, Wood acquired the Lewiston Evening Journal and began printing the two papers from 104 Park Street in Lewiston. On his death in 1945, Wood left the paper to his general manager and nephew by marriage, Louis B. Costello. Costello's son Russell, who succeeded his father in 1959, merged The Sun and Evening Journal in 1989.

== Content ==
=== Editorial stance ===
The Sun embraced an "independent Republican" label from 1898 into the late twentieth century, as opposed to the Evening Journal, which identified as "independent." Still, manager Costello stressed the importance of journalistic objectivity to those who worked under him, and both papers gained a reputation for being socially progressive but not so much as to alienate readers averse to change.
