= Ledgelawn Cemetery =

Historic cemetery in Bar Harbor, Maine

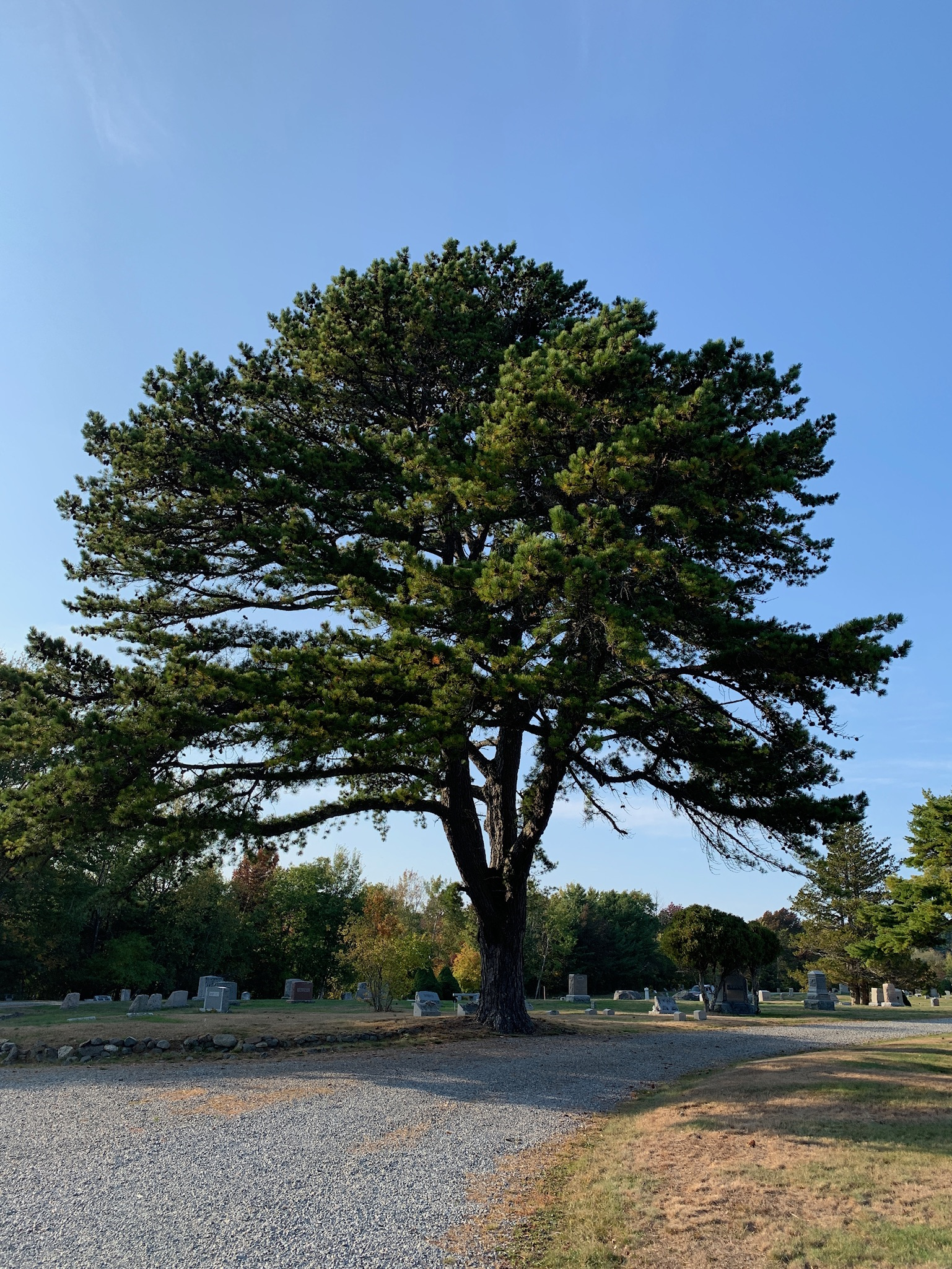
- Inside the cemetery in 2020
- Interactive map of Ledgelawn Cemetery

Details
- Established: 1903 (123 years ago)
- Location: Cromwell Harbor Road; Bar Harbor, Maine
- Country: United States
- Coordinates: 44.37878°N 68.20851°W
- Owned by: Town of Bar Harbor
- Find a Grave: Ledgelawn Cemetery

Ledgelawn Cemetery is a historic cemetery in Bar Harbor, Maine, United States that was established in 1903.

== Notable burials ==
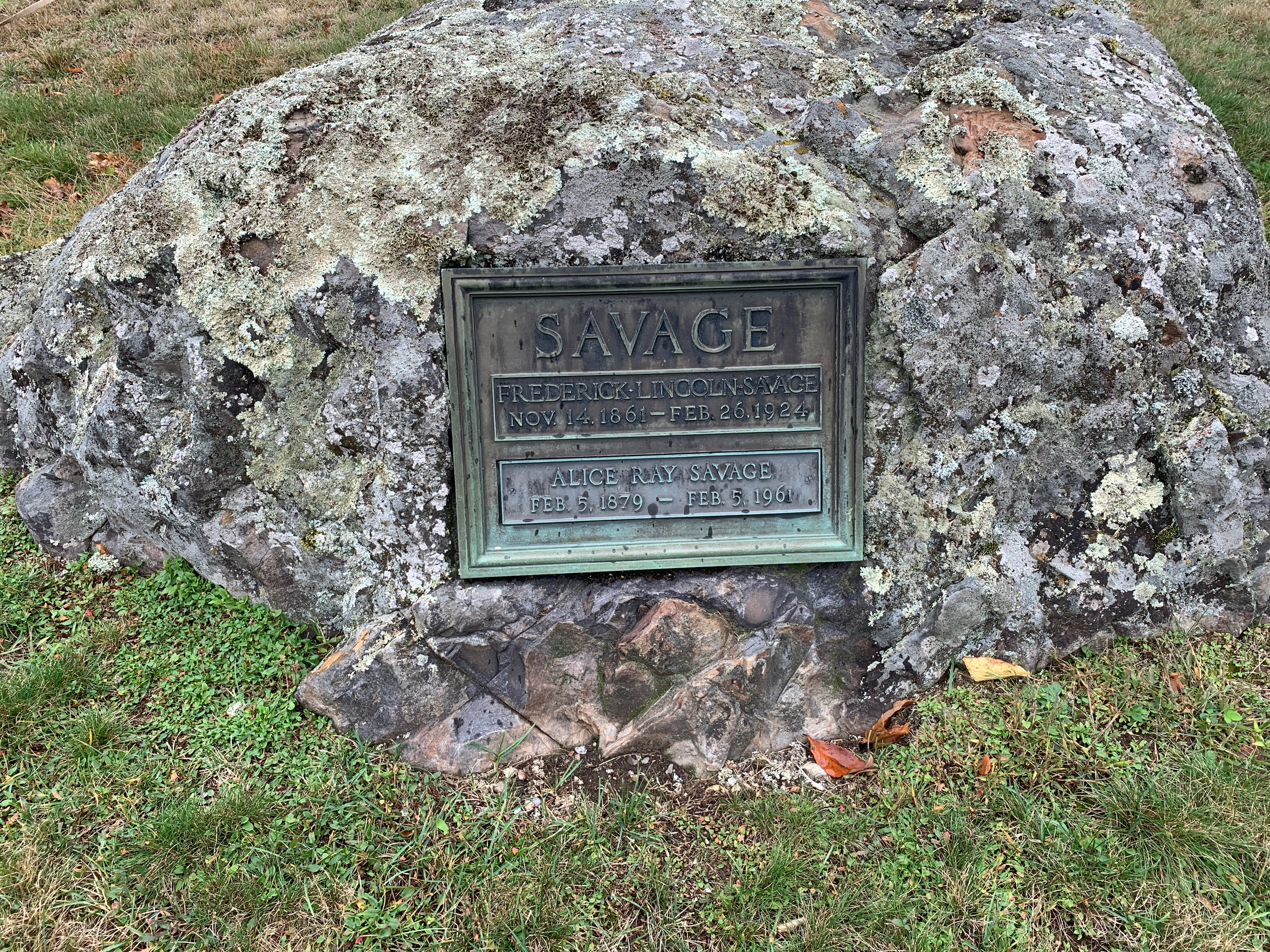
Gravestone of Frederick Lincoln Savage

Listed chronologically:

- Frederick Lincoln Savage (1861–1924), architect
- William Henry Sherman (1865–1928), businessman and author
- Walter Damrosch (1862–1950), composer and conductor
- George G. McMurtry (1876–1958), Medal of Honor recipient
- Genevieve Fox (1888–1959), author

== See also ==
- List of cemeteries in Maine
