= The Advertiser Democrat =

Newspaper in Maine, United States

Advertiser Democrat
- Buy or borrow a copy
- Type: Weekly newspaper
- Format: Broadsheet
- Owner(s): Sun Media Group/Maine Today Media
- Publisher: Maine Today Media
- Editor: A. M. Sheehan
- Founded: 1826
- Headquarters: 220 Main Street, Norway, Maine 04268 United States
- Website: advertiserdemocrat.com

The Advertiser Democrat is a weekly newspaper (2025 publication cut back to every other week) serving 18 towns in the Greater Oxford Hills region of western Maine in the United States. It is published weekly on Thursday from its editorial/advertising offices in Norway, Maine. The newspaper is printed in Lewiston.

Depending on how it is dated, the Advertiser Democrat is either the oldest weekly newspaper in Maine, or the oldest paper, period. The current paper is the result of a merger between two competing periodicals, the Norway Advertiser and the Oxford Democrat, which merged in 1933.

Since June, 2005, the Advertiser Democrat has been owned by the Costello family, which also owns the daily Lewiston Sun Journal, as well as a number of weekly newspapers, including: the Bethel Citizen, the Falmouth Forecaster, and the Rumford Falls Times.

== History ==
=== "Pre-History" ===
The Advertiser Democrat traces its ancestry to the first newspaper published in Oxford County, Maine, the Oxford Observer. Founded by Asa Barton, the Observer was published from what was then the county seat, Paris Hill, Maine. The first issue appeared on July 8, 1824. People who claim the Advertiser is the oldest newspaper in Maine tend to use this date. The next oldest surviving newspaper, the Kennebec Journal was founded in 1826.

However, for reasons unknown, the Advertiser officially dates itself from 1826, when Barton moved the newspaper from Paris Hill to neighboring Norway, Maine. Barton was a supporter of John Quincy Adams for president, a move which reportedly put him out of step with his Paris Hill neighbors, and even, seemingly, his own editorial staff. It is said that Barton moved his presses in the dead of night, by ox cart. The first issue published from Norway appeared on November 29, 1826. On December 14, 1826, the paper carried this terse notice:

As the Observer is now published at Norway, the labors of the present Editor will terminate with this number. His connection with the paper is now dissolved. J.G.C

The first Norway issue of the Observer carried this notice, which also gives some insight to the world of early 19th century newspaper publishing:

INFORMATION

The subscriber would respectfully inform his friends and the Patrons of this Paper in this vicinity, that the contemplated removal of the Printing Offices will not interfere with any arrangement, as to the delivery of the Papers of the pay for them. All such as have engaged to pay Wood the ensuing winter, are informed that it will be received by the subscriber, near his present residence, (the place to be designated in some future paper) All Papers which are now delivered at this Office will, after the first week in December, be delivered at the Bar-Room of Mr. Simeon Norris without any additional expense to the Subscribers. Our other Subscribers will receive their Papers as usual by the different Mail Carriers.

Asa Barton, Agent.

The Observer's existence in Norway was short-lived however. In 1829, Barton sold the paper to William Goodnow, who rechristened it The Politician in 1832 and moved it to Portland, Maine.

=== The Oxford Democrat ===
Undaunted, Asa Barton started a second newspaper, The Oxford Oracle in 1833.

When dating the lineage of what is now known as The Advertiser Democrat, this 1833 marker would seem to be best, rather than the 1824, or 1826 dates of Barton's earlier publications. However, the current paper does hearken back to the original Oxford Observer, using a masthead which a similar font to the original publication and a printing press in the flag that is nearly identical to the one used in that very first 1824 issue.

Barton's second go-round as a newspaper publisher was short-lived. After just seven issues, he sold the paper to George W. Millett, of Norway, and Octavious King, of Paris, Maine, both of whom had been apprentice printers at the original Observer.

Millett and King quickly changed the name of their paper to the Oxford Democrat and moved it back to Paris Hill. Like many newspapers of the era, the Democrat largely reflected the views of the political party for which it was named.

In 1839, Millett took over as sole owner, by which time the paper had returned to Norway. A decade later, fire destroyed the Democrat's printing offices and the following year, 1850, Millett sold the paper to George L. Mellen & Co.

According to the 175th anniversary issue of the Advertiser Democrat, published January 3, 2002, "After several more ownership changes," the Democrat was moved to South Paris, Maine in 1907 by its then-current owners, George Atwood and Arthur Forbes. Then, during the height of the depression, in 1933, Forbes, who appears to have had sole ownership of the Democrat by then, sold out to Fred W. Sanborn, owner and publisher of the Norway Advertiser.

The last issue of the 'Oxford Democrat' was published November 7, 1933. Its subscribers were signed up to receive the Norway Advertiser.

=== The Norway Advertiser ===
In a column published in the October 22, 1886 issue of the Oxford County Advertiser, Dr. Osgood N. Bradbury recalled the origins of the paper.

Forty-three years ago last June, a man whose name I afterwards learned was Berry, came into the field where I was assisting my father in hoeing corn, and stated that it was his intention to start a paper in Norway village the next spring, to be called the Norway Advertiser, and wished my father to become a subscriber. He did so, which pleased me exceedingly, as reading material of any sort was very scarce among the farmers of Oxford County at that time.

The subscription salesman was Ira Berry and, true to his word, he did indeed start a newspaper. The first issue of the Norway Advertiser appeared on Tuesday, March 10, 1844. In the April 12, 1844 issue, Berry and his co-publisher, Francis Blake, Jr., wrote in a "Prospectus" for the Advertiser: "It may be well to state that it is not intended to make the paper the organ of any political party, nor to interfere with partisan politics." The editorial, which billed the Advertiser as "A newspaper calculated for working men and their families," may well have been a jab at the rival Oxford Democrat.

In April, 1882, the printing offices of the paper, along with its list of subscribers, was lost in a fire that wiped out 10 structures along Norway's Main Street. By that time, the paper has been re-dubbed the Oxford County Advertiser and it was under the ownership of Simeon Drake and C. E. Meserve. The fire was reported to have started in an attic directly over the print shop. For two months, the Advertiser was out of business while its owners scrambled to rebuild their operations.

Fred Sanborn arrived on the scene right after the 1882 fire, having sold his interest in a New Hampshire newspaper. Having attended high school in Norway for a short time, he had returned hoping to make a home in the town and take up the newspaper trade there. Sanborn partnered with Drake and bought out the job printing job of the Rev. J. A. Seitz, located at the present home of the Advertiser Democrat at 1 Pikes Hill.

Rev. Seitz, whose son Don Seitz would later go on to become business manager off the New York World, had a weekly newspaper at the time called New Religion. He sold the subscription list for this paper, and the print shop business to Drake and Sanborn. However, he took his four-horsepower, steam-driven printing press to North Conway, New Hampshire, where New Religion resumed publication with the July 14, 1882 issue.

Meanwhile, the Advertiser returned to the streets with the July 23, 1882 issue, thanks to a printing press Sanborn purchased in Somersworth, New Hampshire for $100. When the Advertiser resumed publication, Sanborn announced that it would continue politically as an "independent."

On January 1, 1883, Sanborn, along with his wife, Laura, bought Drake's interest in the Advertiser. At that time, the four-page publication had struck "Oxford County" from the masthead and was once again circulated under the banner of the Norway Advertiser. With Sanborn at the helm, the 'Advertiser' soon became the paper of record for Oxford County. Circulation grew to 2,000 copies weekly, thanks in large part to promotions that gave away free papers. A January 1, 1882, notice had listed circulation of the Oxford County Advertiser at 800.

Free papers may have helped, but one assumes content mattered. Otherwise, the Advertiser would never have been able to hold onto its readership base. For that end of the business, much thanks may be given to Sanborn's wife, Laura, who served as editor of the paper from 1882 until her death, following surgery, in 1923.

When Laura died, Sanborn's nephew, Ralph S. Osgood, originally of Lowell, Massachusetts, became editor and manager of the paper, having begun his apprenticeship in 1908 during summers spent with his aunt and uncle. However, Sanborn still exercised a strong influence of the paper. He was said to believe that no personal item was too insignificant to print, holding a strong view that these details produced a living history of the community.

=== The Advertiser Democrat ===
With the depression cutting sharply into revenues, the merged papers, now called the Advertiser Democrat, became a tabloid. When Sanborn died in 1938, ownership of the paper passed to Osgood. The leadership styles of the two men were recounted by Mearle M. Brown in a 1963 issue of the Oxford County Review:

Two people could not have been more unlike than these two. Fred Sanborn was brusque, fiery and turbulent; Ralph Osgood was quiet, almost retiring, but their ability in the newspaper business was almost on par.

Osgood never married and, like his uncle, had no children. Taking his cue from Sanborn's example, Osgood invited his nephew, Robert C. Sallies, of Weirs Beach, New Hampshire to summer in Norway and learn the newspaper trade, beginning in 1949. Sallies graduated from the University of New Hampshire in 1954, became business manager of the Advertiser Democrat in 1955, and inherited the business on July 2, 1959, when Osgood died.

Sallies promoted Benjamin Tucker from the paper's staff to the editor's post in 1960. Then, in 1961, Sallies entered the Andover Newton Theological School, where he received his B.D. degree in 1964. The following year, Sallies became minister of the Universalist Church in Westbrook, Maine.

Meanwhile, Sallies continued to serve as publisher of the Advertiser Democrat. In 1964, Stanley Newhall, of Waterford, Maine, replaced Tucker as the paper's editor. When Newhall retired, Sallies wife, Margie, took the reins.

On July 22, 1976, Sallies sold the paper to Howard James. Sallies operation had become a central printing plant a decade earlier with the installation of a Goss Community Offset printing press. The papers it printed included the Bridgton News, the Rumford Falls Times and the Berlin Reporter.

James, a 1968 Pulitzer Prize winner for a series "Crisis in the Courts," team-written while he was Chicago Bureau Chief for the Christian Science Monitor, moved to New Hampshire in 1972, while he continued to write books and lecture around the country. That year, he married Judith Vogel Munro, who had taken sole ownership of the Berlin Reporter in 1970 upon the death of her husband, Stevenson Munro, in a horseback riding accident.

At one point, Howard and Judy James owned seven newspapers in Maine and New Hampshire, with Horwad James acting as publisher, often writing and editing as well, and Judy James active in management, editing, advertising sales, writing and photography over the years. However, by the turn of the century the couple had sold off or closed all of their holdings except for the Advertiser Democrat and the Rumford Falls Times.

With none of the James and Munro children expressing an interest in taking over the papers, James sold out to the Costello Family, publishers of the daily Lewiston Sun Journal in June, 2005.

Once the Sun Media Group bought the paper, Ed Snook served as publisher, while editor A.M. Sheehan headed up the newsroom of two full-time reporters. Since Snook and Sheehan took the helm, the paper has won numerous awards from the Maine Press Association and New England Newspaper & Press Association as well as the 2011 George Polk Award for Local Reporting, Finalist, Michael Kelly Award - 2012 and A.M. Sheehan and Matt Hongoltz-Hetling were Nominees for a 2012 Pulitzer Prize for the body of work they did on Section 8 rental housing in the area.

Today, the Advertiser Democrat and entire Sun Media group is owned by Maine Today Media and Reade Brower. Sheehan continues to lead the paper as well as all other Sun Media western Maine weeklies as Managing Editor under Executive Editor Judy Meyer.

== Online ==
Usually every Friday, up to four of the 11 front-page stories from that week's Advertiser Democrat appear on the newspaper's website: www.advertiserdemocrat.com. Pointers to the paper's online presence is www.advertiserdemocrat.com. The Advertiser Democrat is more popularly known as simply The Advertiser.
