= Governor's House (Togus, Maine) =

Historic house in Maine, United States

- U.S. National Register of Historic Places
- U.S. National Historic Landmark
- U.S. Historic district – Contributing property
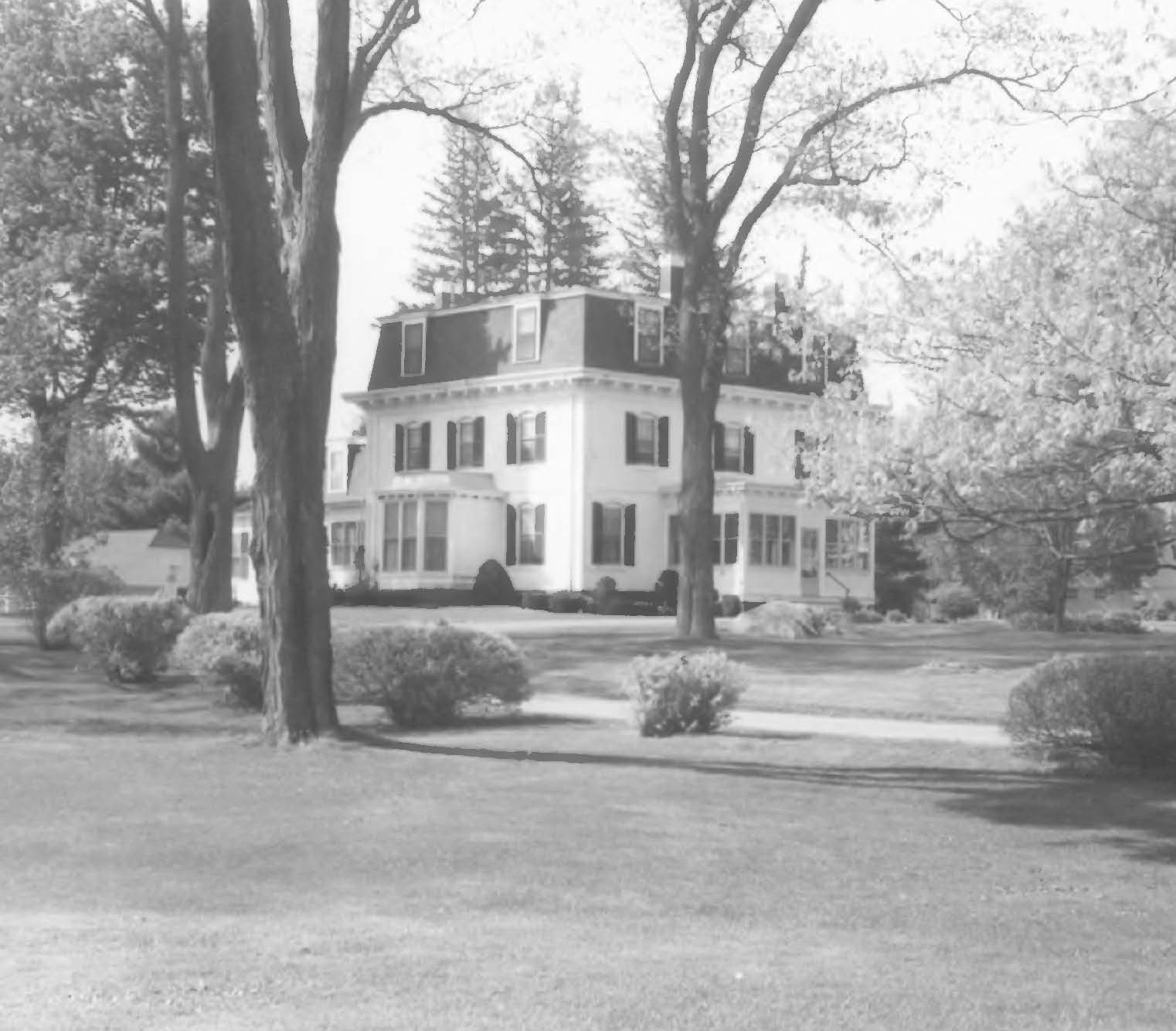
- Governor's House in 1973

- Location within Maine Location within the United States
- Location: Off ME 17, Togus, Maine
- Coordinates: 44°16′48″N 69°42′8″W
- Area: 1 acre (0.40 ha)
- Built: 1869
- Built by: Nathaniel Head
- Architect: Benjamin F. Dwight
- Architectural style: Second Empire
- Part of: Togus VA Medical Center and National Cemetery (ID12000826)
- NRHP reference No.: 74000319

Significant dates
- Added to NRHP: February 23, 1974
- Designated NHL: May 30, 1974
- Designated CP: October 3, 2012

The Director's Quarters, Togus Veterans' Administration Center, previously known as the Governor's House, is a historic house on the grounds of the Veterans Administration (VA) facility in Togus, Maine. The house, built in 1869, is historically significant as the only surviving structure of the first National Home for Disabled Volunteer Soldiers, established at Togus in 1866 to serve American Civil War veterans. It was designated a National Historic Landmark in 1974. It is a contributing element of the historic district encompassing the Togus VA campus.

== Description and history ==
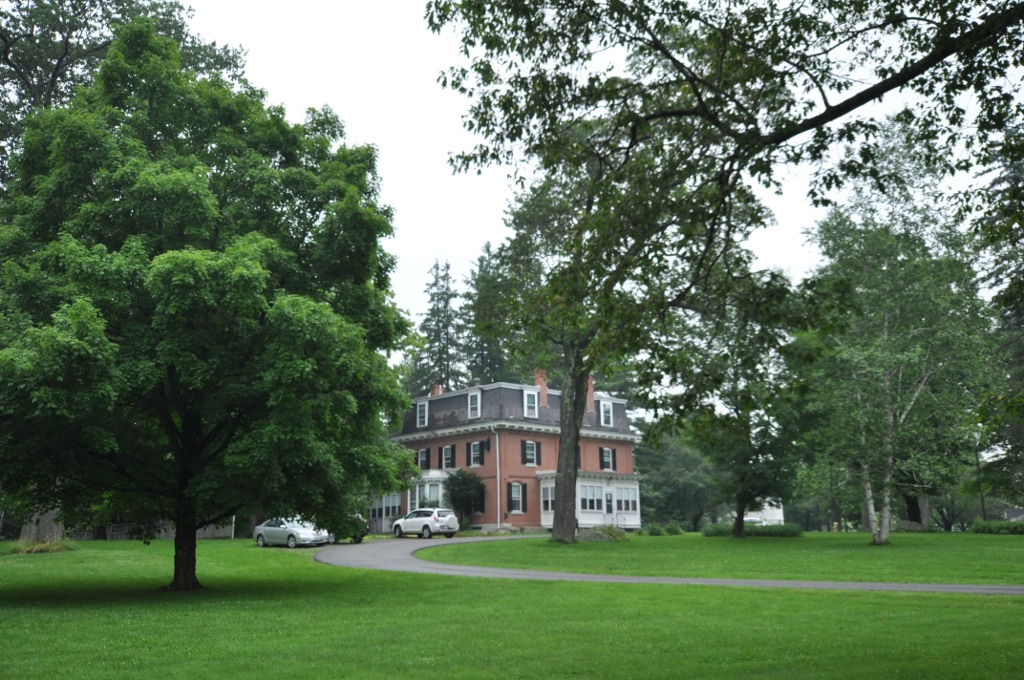
Governor's House in 2013.

The Governor's House is a 2 1/2-story brick structure, with a mansard roof and a granite foundation. Its main block is three bays wide and three bays deep, with shuttered sash windows set in openings with granite sills and segmented-arch lintels. The main (south-facing) facade, has a single-story enclosed porch across its center half, topped by a shallow-pitch hip roof. A two-story wing extends to the rear of the main block, significantly increasing its size. The house as 22 rooms in all, and has retained most of its original woodwork.

The site that is now the Togus VA facility is the first veterans facility established by the United States. It was established by an act of Congress in 1866, to provide a space for "any worthy soldier" who was "suffering such a degree of disability" so as to need such a facility. The property acquired by the government was a summer resort, capitalizing on local mineral springs, that had gone bankrupt in the war. This facility opened in 1866, and its main buildings were destroyed or damaged by fire in 1868. The government embarked on a major building campaign in 1868–69, of which the residence of the facility's governor (now director) is now the only surviving building. The buildings of this building campaign were designed by the Boston architect Benjamin F. Dwight, and the contractor was Nathaniel Head of Hooksett, New Hampshire.

It continues to be used for residential purposes.

== See also ==
- List of National Historic Landmarks in Maine
- National Register of Historic Places listings in Kennebec County, Maine
