= Granite Store (Sullivan, Maine) =

- U.S. National Register of Historic Places
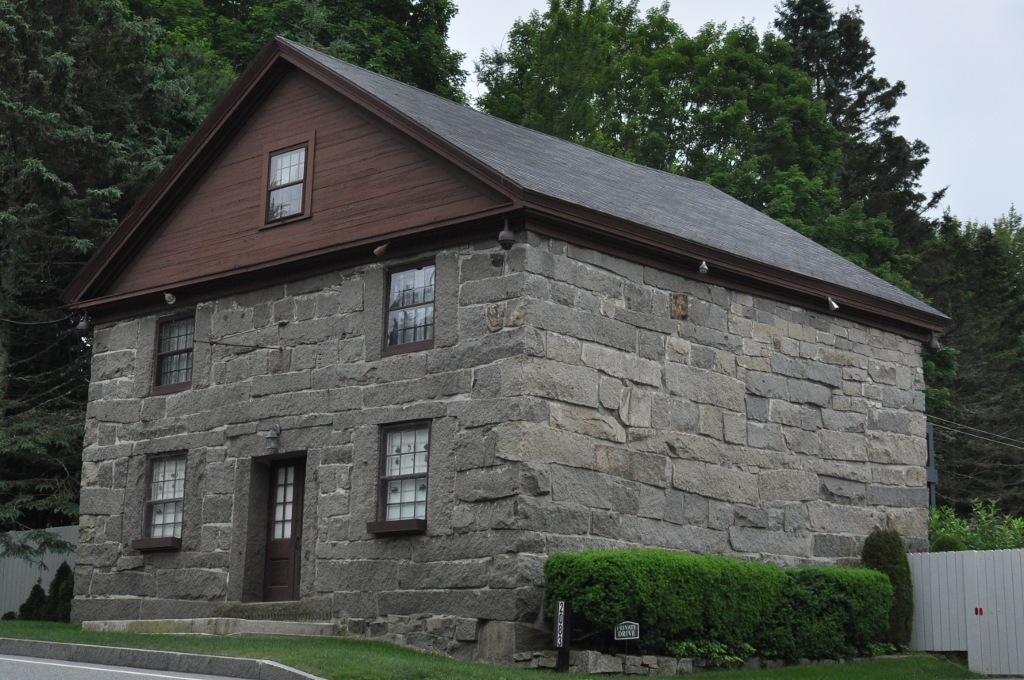

- Location within Maine Location within the United States
- Location: U.S. 1, Sullivan, Maine
- Coordinates: 44°31′12″N 68°11′57″W
- Area: 1 acre (0.40 ha)
- Architectural style: Greek Revival
- NRHP reference No.: 74000152
- Added to NRHP: December 16, 1974

The Granite Store is a historic commercial building in United States Route 1 in Sullivan, Maine. It is an unusual example of Greek Revival architecture, executed in rough-cut granite, probably built between 1835 and 1850. The building was listed on the National Register of Historic Places in 1974. It is now apparently in residential use.

== Description and history ==
The Granite Store is set on the south side of US Route 1, between its junction with Maine State Route 200 and the crossing of Mill Brook. It is a 2-1/2 story structure with a front-facing gable roof. It is set on a granite foundation, and its two stories are fashioned out of courses of locally quarried rough cut granite; the gable ends are framed in wood and finished in weatherboard, with a cornice molding outlining it. The main facade faces north, and has a central entry set in a frame of long granite blocks. This is flanked by a pair of sash windows, with slightly smaller sash windows above. An even smaller sash window is located in the gable end. Both side walls lack any sort of fenestration. The rear of the building has two windows on the first floor and one on the second, with an additional space on the second floor where there was once a doorway probably used as a loading entry.

It is believed that the initial use of the building, probably built in the 1840s, was as a salt and supply store for fisherman working on the Grand Banks. By the late 1850s the property was in use as a shipyard, where fishing schooners were built; the store would have then served as a chandlery, providing mariners with all manner of supplies. The building has had long periods of vacancy since the 1870s, seeing occasional use as a gift shop and art gallery. It now appears to have been adapted for residential use.

== See also ==
- National Register of Historic Places listings in Hancock County, Maine
