= William S. Wells =

American politician

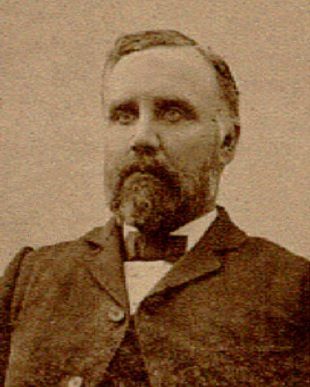
- Official portrait, 1895

Member of the Maine House of Representatives from the Berwick and Wells district
- In office January 2, 1895 – January 6, 1897
- Preceded by: William S. Mathews
- Succeeded by: Edward F. Gowell

Personal details
- Born: William Stover Wells; May 29, 1848 Wells, Maine, U.S.
- Died: June 6, 1916 (aged 68) Wells, Maine, U.S.
- Party: Republican
- Spouses: Elvira Corrie Pope (m. 1872; died 1888); Annie Hill Costello (m. 1889)
- Education: Maine State Seminary

William Stover Wells (May 29, 1848 – June 6, 1916) was an American politician who served one term in the Maine House of Representatives. A member of the Republican Party, he represented the towns of Berwick and Wells in York County. He was educated at the Maine State Seminary, which later became Bates College.

Maine House of Representatives
Preceded by William S. Mathews	Maine Representative from Berwick and Wells; 1895–1897	Succeeded by Edward F. Gowell
