= Androscoggin Bank =

American bank

- Company type: Private company
- Industry: Financial services
- Founded: 1870; 156 years ago
- Headquarters: Lewiston, Maine, United States
- Number of locations: 12 branches
- Key people: Neil Kiely, president
- Products: Retail banking, Loans
- Website: Website

Androscoggin Bancorp, Inc. is an American bank headquartered in Lewiston, Maine with 12 branches in the Portland-Lewiston-South Portland, Maine Combined Statistical Area. The bank has owned the naming rights to the Androscoggin Bank Colisée since 2006.
