= Forest City Cemetery =

Cemetery in South Portland, Maine, US

Coordinates: 43°38′00″N 70°16′46″W

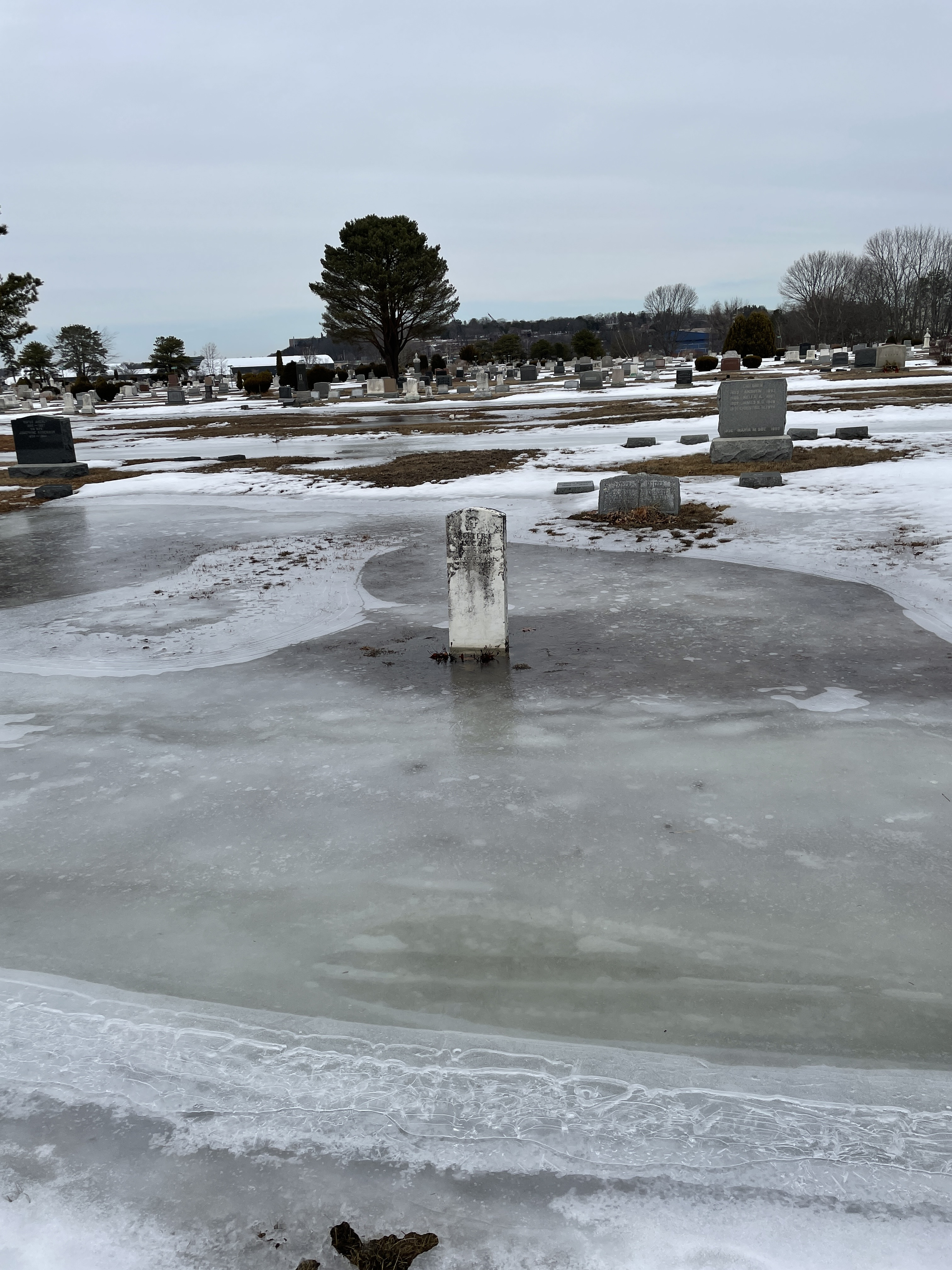
- Interactive map of Forest City Cemetery

Details
- Established: 1858
- Location: South Portland, Maine
- Country: United States
- Owned by: City of Portland
- Size: 12 acres (4.9 ha)
- No. of graves: ~30,000
- Website: City of Portland – Forest City Cemetery
- Find a Grave: Forest City Cemetery

Forest City Cemetery is a 97-acre (39 ha) cemetery in South Portland, Maine, owned and operated by the adjacent city of Portland. There are approximately 30,000 burials in the cemetery. Its burial records are kept at Evergreen Cemetery in Portland.

When the land was purchased in 1858, it cost the city $50,000. The first plot was established later that year; however, the oldest grave found in the cemetery is that of Sara Strout, who died in 1810. Her grave is the only lasting grave that is legible amongst the slate graves in the tree line.

As of 1870, the cemetery had 24 burials of American Civil War veterans. It also contains one Commonwealth war grave, of a Royal Naval Volunteer Reserve seaman of World War I.

In April 2016, the cemetery was vandalized. Four headstones were overturned and a number of others damaged.
