= Sullivan, Maine =

Town in Maine, United States

- Town
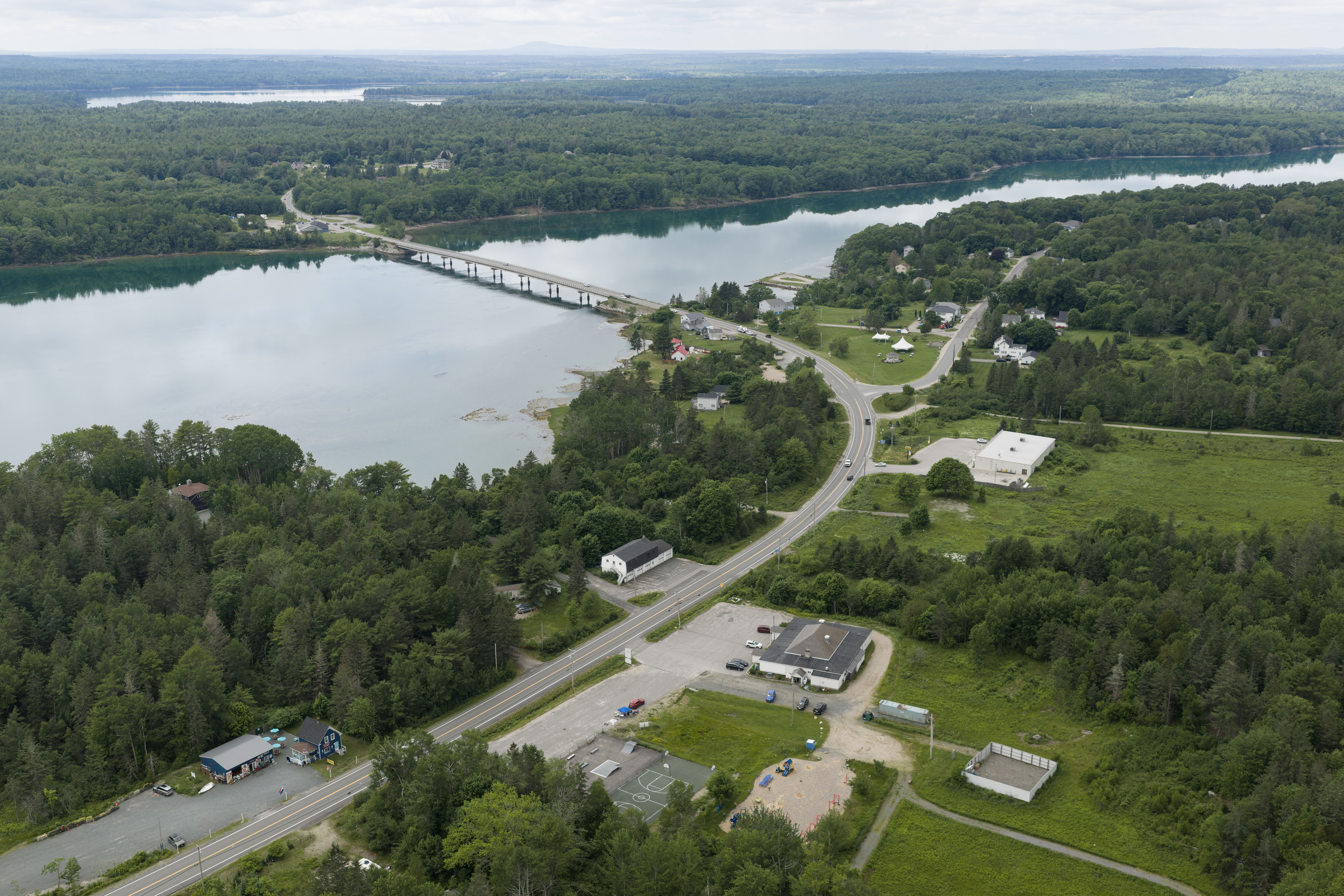
- Aerial view along U.S. Route 1

- Location within Maine Location within the United States
- Coordinates: 44°31′10″N 68°09′17″W
- Country: United States
- State: Maine
- County: Hancock
- Villages: Sullivan Harbour; Ashville; Alderville; East Sullivan; North Sullivan; West Sullivan; Tunk Station; Punkinville; Morancy

Area
  - Total: 29.62 sq mi (76.72 km^{2})
  - Land: 26.67 sq mi (69.07 km^{2})
  - Water: 2.95 sq mi (7.64 km^{2})
- Elevation: 200 ft (61 m)

Population (2020)
  - Total: 1,219
  - Density: 46/sq mi (17.6/km^{2})
- Time zone: UTC-5 (Eastern (EST))
  - Summer (DST): UTC-4 (EDT)
- ZIP code: 04664
- Area code: 207
- FIPS code: 23-74965
- GNIS feature ID: 582754
- Website: sullivanmaine.org

Sullivan is a town in Hancock County, Maine, United States. The population was 1,219 at the 2020 census. The town was named for Daniel Sullivan, an early settler. Colloquially referred to as "Sully" or "the Sullivans"—like many Maine municipalities composed of villages with geographic designations of the town proper—the municipality was incorporated in 1789. Located in the Upper Schoodic Peninsula sub-region of Maine's Downeast Acadia region, the municipality has been known as "Waukeag", "New Bristol", and later Sullivan; and once included the nearby communities of Hancock, Sorrento, and what would later be (parts of Gouldsboro Point TWP, Tunk Lake TWP, the Schoodic Foothills, Hog Bay, and various other districts over time divided off) Township 7, South & Middle Districts. Once home to abundant granite quarries, the town of Sullivan is now a residential community for nearby Ellsworth and Mount Desert Island. Located along U.S. Route 1, the Taunton River, and Hog Bay, Sullivan is home to a reversing tidal falls and many scenic turnouts that dot the Schoodic National Scenic Byway along the Upper Schoodic Peninsula.

== Geography ==
According to the United States Census Bureau, the town has a total area of 29.62 square miles (76.72 km^{2}), of which 26.67 square miles (69.07 km^{2}) is land and 2.95 square miles (7.64 km^{2}) is water.

== Demographics ==
Historical population
Census	Pop.	Note	%±
1790	504		—
1800	533		5.8%
1810	711		33.4%
1820	872		22.6%
1830	538		−38.3%
1840	649		20.6%
1850	810		24.8%
1860	862		6.4%
1870	796		−7.7%
1880	1,023		28.5%
1890	1,379		34.8%
1900	1,034		−25.0%
1910	1,132		9.5%
1920	916		−19.1%
1930	873		−4.7%
1940	801		−8.2%
1950	762		−4.9%
1960	709		−7.0%
1970	824		16.2%
1980	967		17.4%
1990	1,118		15.6%
2000	1,185		6.0%
2010	1,236		4.3%
2020	1,219		−1.4%
U.S. Decennial Census

=== 2010 census ===
As of the census of 2010, there were 1,236 people, 528 households, and 332 families residing in the town. The population density was 46.3 inhabitants per square mile (17.9/km^{2}). There were 806 housing units at an average density of 30.2 per square mile (11.7/km^{2}). The racial makeup of the town was 95.6% White, 0.2% African American, 0.6% Native American, 0.3% Asian, 0.8% from other races, and 2.5% from two or more races. Hispanic or Latino of any race were 1.0% of the population.

There were 528 households, of which 25.9% had children under the age of 18 living with them, 49.6% were married couples living together, 8.5% had a female householder with no husband present, 4.7% had a male householder with no wife present, and 37.1% were non-families. 25.8% of all households were made up of individuals, and 8.4% had someone living alone who was 65 years of age or older. The average household size was 2.34 and the average family size was 2.81.

The median age in the town was 44.7 years. 19.9% of residents were under the age of 18; 6.8% were between the ages of 18 and 24; 24% were from 25 to 44; 35.3% were from 45 to 64; and 14.1% were 65 years of age or older. The gender makeup of the town was 48.8% male and 51.2% female.

=== 2000 census ===
As of the census of 2000, there were 1,185 people, 480 households, and 327 families residing in the town. The population density was 44.6 inhabitants per square mile (17.2/km^{2}). There were 709 housing units at an average density of 26.7 per square mile (10.3/km^{2}). The racial makeup of the town was 98.40% White, 0.34% African American, 0.25% Native American, 0.68% Asian, 0.17% from other races, and 0.17% from two or more races. Hispanic or Latino of any race were 0.25% of the population.

There were 480 households, out of which 29.8% had children under the age of 18 living with them, 55.4% were married couples living together, 7.9% had a female householder with no husband present, and 31.7% were non-families. 23.3% of all households were made up of individuals, and 8.8% had someone living alone who was 65 years of age or older. The average household size was 2.47 and the average family size was 2.89.

In the town, the population was spread out, with 24.4% under the age of 18, 6.8% from 18 to 24, 29.5% from 25 to 44, 26.2% from 45 to 64, and 13.1% who were 65 years of age or older. The median age was 38 years. For every 100 females, there were 96.8 males. For every 100 females age 18 and over, there were 93.5 males.

The median income for a household in the town was $31,509, and the median income for a family was $34,113. Males had a median income of $25,370 versus $17,500 for females. The per capita income for the town was $14,814. About 8.0% of families and 13.6% of the population were below the poverty line, including 12.4% of those under age 18 and 16.8% of those age 65 or over.

== General overview ==
The Town of Sullivan's offices are located on U.S. 1.

Sullivan, Maine, the gateway to the Schoodic Peninsula and the Downeast Acadia region, is composed of several villages and settlements, collectively termed "the Sullivans", or colloquially as "Sully"—similar to other New England municipalities such as:

- West Sullivan – also reflected on the map as "Sullivan" (proper) is the village located on Taunton Bay where the US Rte 1 Bridge—part of the Downeast Acadia Highway, often referred to as the 'Silent Bridge' a homage to the former 'Singing Bridge' that was replaced by the current structure—connects Sullivan to the town of Hancock. Within the area are several homes dating back a century or more, as well as a public common or park (Sumner Memorial Park / the Village Green) and business. Adjacent to the Park is Greeley Hall, home to the Frenchman's Bay Library, Sullivan-Sorrento Rec Centre and a playground complete with a skate park. Sullivan Municipal Building & Townhall, located in the former Sullivan High School (turn of the century) is on US Rte 1 in West Sullivan, houses both the Town's administration, historical society and a joint RSU24/University College (UMaine) center for CCTV courses.
- North Sullivan – also known as North Village and North Sully; located along on Taunton Trail/Drive, northwest of Gordon's Wharf & Track Road is a mainly residential area also on Taunton Bay. North Sullivan also includes a few art galleries, municipal services and the USPS. Once known for its granite quarrying shipped to cities such as Portland, Boston, and New York, London & Hong Kong, North Sullivan is now a bedroom community for Ellsworth, Mount Desert Island and points Downeast. The Old Hooper Havey & Crabtree Co Quarry is a favoured swimming hole for many area residents and exhibits artwork along the cliffs. Various other quarries are now on private land, with one formerly being the site of a retreat that included rental cabins along the edge of the water filled basins.
- East Sullivan – spread along Frenchman's Bay and reaching northeast into the Schoodic Foothills, East Sullivan multiple lakes and access to inland multipurpose recreation trails. Located primarily along US Route 1 (Downeast-Acadia Highway and Schoodic Peninsula Scenic Byway), the village also boasts farm plantations, Oceanhouse housing development, the Town Landing, a sub-regional high school of Maine's Regional School Union #24 (Downeast Acadian Schools, administrated from Ellsworth), Sumner Memorial High School, along with a village fire department, and Scenic Stops along US Rte 1. East Sullivan is also home to a seasonal-art center housed in an old farmhouse barn, in addition to blueberry fields, piney forests, a grange hall, campground, and additional businesses. Tunk Lake, Donnell's Pond, Flander's Pond and Little Tunk Lake are recreational and nature preserve areas within East Sullivan. In 2020 it was reported that the campus of Sumner Memorial High School would be redeveloped; a new high school and junior high school facility would be constructed on land adjacent to the current structure and named the Charles Sumner Memorial Academic Campus. New names were proposed for the schools included Frenchman's Bay Jr/Sr High School, Schoodic Peninsula High School (there is a Peninsula Elementary School in Gouldsboro-WH) and Schoodic Regional School. Voters district wide supported maintaining the Sumner Memorial name, out of historic respect to Dr Sumner who donated both the lands and funds, in addition to civic effort, to build the old school. East Sullivan will remain the heart of secondary education for the region.
- Sullivan Harbor – at the heart of the municipality, Sullivan Harbor is home to some of the oldest homes in the town; Directly across Frenchman's Bay from Bar Harbor and Mount Desert Island, Sullivan Harbor has long been home to many bed & breakfasts, seasonal summer 'cottages', and businesses. Other local businesses have seen over the century and decades a resurgence of interest as tourists begin expanding beyond the well-known resort towns towards other niches. Sullivan Harbor's Frenchman's Bay Scenic Overlook provides travelers a pit stop panoramic view of Mount Desert Island and the Atlantic. The village boasts the aforementioned along with tennis courts, a general store (Dunbar's) and the Municipal Boat Launch. Sullivan Harbor's Old Granite Store building, an historic edifice that straddles the head of the harbor at the corner of US Rte 1 and Harbor view, is constructed of locally quarried granite dating back to the 1800s; the building was once a salt-storage facility, later part of a shipyard, a customs building or market house, and in the later 1900s home to a variety of ventures ranging from bed-and-breakfasts to artisan galleries or private residences. Various historic markers dot the area, and include photos of the rusticator era Waukeag House Hotel that once sat where the general store now does. Sullivan Harbor's Wharf is accessible off Benevento Ave. The historic Sullivan Harbor Church stands on Harborside Drive.
- Alderville Township & Taunton Shores – along Franklin's Hog Bay on South Bay Road are the communities of Alderville and the North Sullivan subdivision of Taunton Shores; residential areas located between Sullivan and Franklin have long been considered part of Sullivan though they tend to fall within the Town of Franklin's limits. Home to the University of Maine Aquaculture Co-operative, Alderville Township is also home to an artisan gallery that has been a family owned business for roughly two decades.
- Punkinville – located inland between Long Cove and East Sullivan, Punkinville is a small, rural, residential hamlet.
- Ashville & Morancy – off US Rte 1 (East) is the enclave of Ashville and further the Morancy Pond Settlements; primarily rural these villages are adjacent to the Sunrise Road Recreational Trail that runs from Machias, Maine (Washington County) through in-land Hancock County. Ashville is the location of one of the still-functioning historic chapels in Sullivan.

The town's inland area along Rte 200 (Bert Grey Road) in to the Schoodic Foothills is a mainly wooded area that boasts commercial and residential value, in addition to being the location of the municipal grade school, Mountain View School (K–8) which—as part of Schoodic Community Schools and RSU24—provides education (primary, middle, and junior high) to the Towns of Sullivan, Sorrento, and Franklin.

Sullivan, Maine, as part of the Upper Schoodic Peninsula sub-region is a member of the Schoodic Peninsula Chamber of Commerce; Sullivan is located roughly 11 miles to nearby Winter Harbor, ME, and the Schoodic District of Acadia National Park. The Town is roughly 17 miles from the heart of Downtown Ellsworth, ME—the shire town of Hancock County—and approximately 35 miles by land from the Village Green in Bar Harbor, ME on Mount Desert Island, though from various points along its shoreline the Island can be easily seen and is, nautically and geographically, closer by sea than by land. Ferry Service is available to and from the Schoodic region and may be accessed semi-seasonally (on a schedule) or by appointment (by change) in nearby Winter Harbor; some resources available to visitors can be found by contacting local Harbor Masters or business. The Island Explorer Transit Service serves the Schoodic Peninsula with hubs in Winter Harbor, Ellsworth, and Bar Harbor.

=== Sullivan: art, culture, and society ===
The Town of Sullivan, Maine's villages were featured in the novel Seven Steeples, which focused on the communities that grew surrounding the Chapels and Churches that served them.

Sullivan Harbor was the inspiration for the setting of the novel The Tinker of Salt Cove.

West Sullivan was the scene of author Jack Havey's memoir West Sullivan Days.

The area, encompassing mostly nearby Hancock and Hancock Point, was featured as the filming location for part(s) of the film adaptation of Stephen King's Pet Sematary.

The Schoodic Peninsula's Upper Peninsula section transitions to the Lower Peninsula at the Gouldsboro/Sullivan town line, while the demarcation between the Schoodic Foothills & the Upper Peninsula is less formalized, but considered to end at the Franklin/Sullivan town line and the transition from Taunton to Hog Bay via water. Formerly, the colonial term "Schoodicshire" has been used in ages-passed for the two regions collectively.

"Schoodic" is the anglicized form of a Passamaquoddy term, thought to mean "the burned place". Waukeag, the distinct name for the Sullivan area, also is of Passamaquoddy origin, derived from a name that roughly translates to "place where the tide has dug out a hole", referring to the Tidal Falls, among other interpretations. Maine's history as a disputed frontier territory between the British North American Colonies and French New France, and later a district of the Massachusetts Bay Colony (later Commonwealth) has provided the area with a distinctive, unique historic status.

== Education ==
The school district is Regional School Unit 24. An elementary school, Mountain View School, is located in Sullivan. The district's secondary schools, Sumner Middle School and Sumner Memorial High School, are a part of the Sumner Learning Campus in Sullivan.

== Notable people ==
- Richard E. Byrd (1888–1957), American naval officer and polar explorer who kept a summer residence in Sullivan known as Wickyup
- Alice Turner Curtis (1860–1958), author of juvenile historical fiction born in Sullivan (and lived there for an indeterminate period of time)
- Graham Platner (born 1984), oyster farmer and 2026 US Senate candidate who withdrew due to allegations of sexual assault
- Paul Dudley Sargent (1745–1828), privateer and Revolutionary War soldier
- William Henry Sherman (1865–1928), publisher
- Marjorie Spock (1904–2008), environmentalist, writer, and poet
- Marcus Urann (1873–1963), founder of the Ocean Spray cooperative and the Phi Kappa Phi Honor Society
