= Randall Cemetery =

Historic burial place in Freeport, Maine

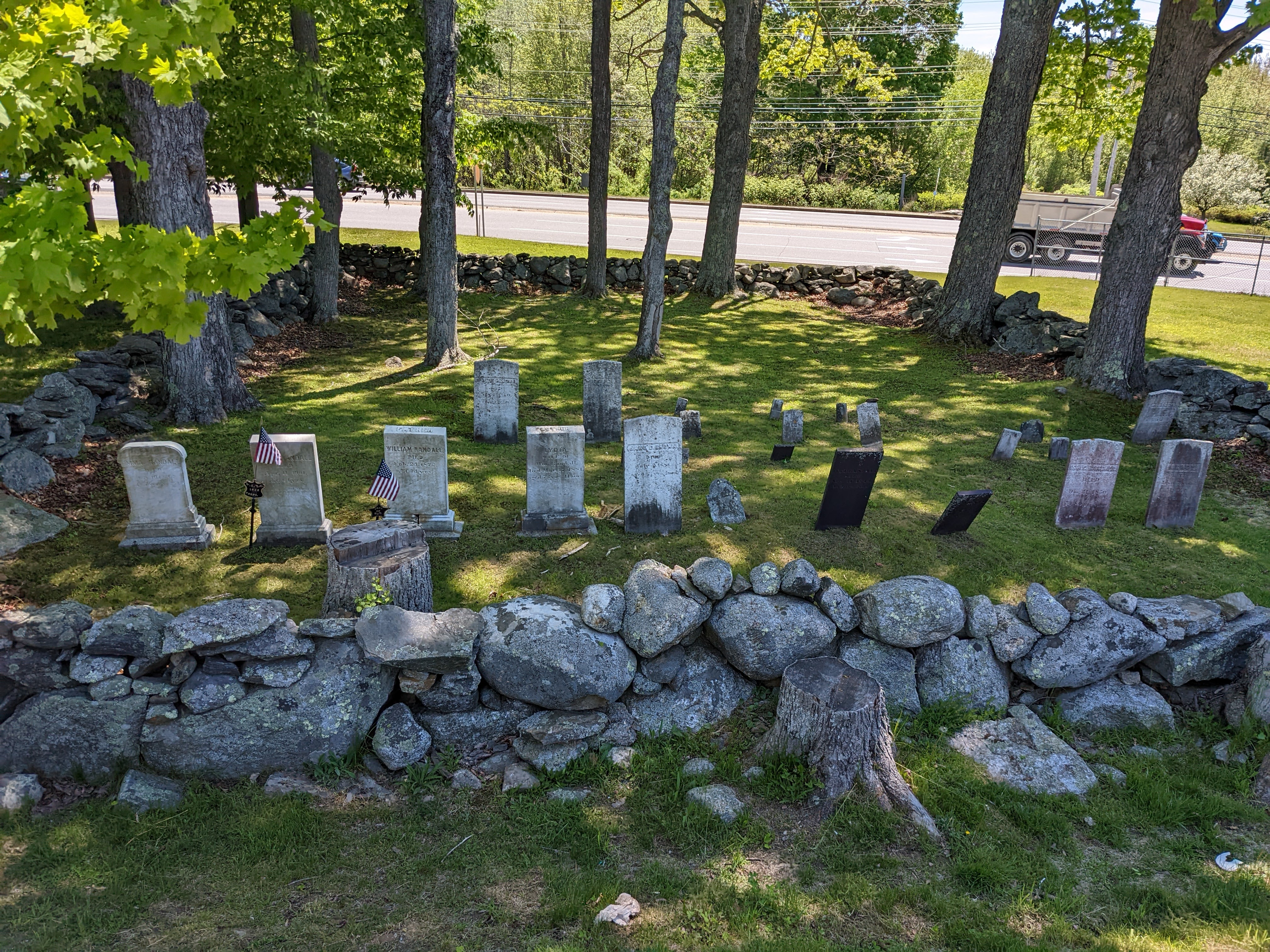
- The cemetery in 2022, looking southeast to Lower Main Street
- Interactive map of Randall Cemetery

Details
- Location: Corner of Lower Main Street and Desert Road; Freeport, Maine
- Country: United States
- Coordinates: 43°50′36″N 70°07′06″W
- Type: Private
- No. of graves: 17
- Find a Grave: Randall Cemetery

Randall Cemetery is a historic cemetery in Freeport, Maine, United States. Located at the corner of Lower Main Street (U.S. Route 1) and Desert Road, it contains seventeen headstones, the earliest dating to 1831. The small plot contains pine trees both in and around its low dry stone wall.

The cemetery was part of the Randall family farm, run by Isaac (1770–1850) and Mercy Randall (1776–1840), a site now occupied by a Shaw's grocery store. The farm house and buildings were on the Shaw's side of the street, then a dirt track, while a barn stood on the opposite side of today's Lower Main Street. All the buildings were demolished when construction on the ramps to and from Interstate 295 began.
