= Old Settlers Cemetery (South Portland, Maine) =

Cemetery in South Portland, Maine, USA

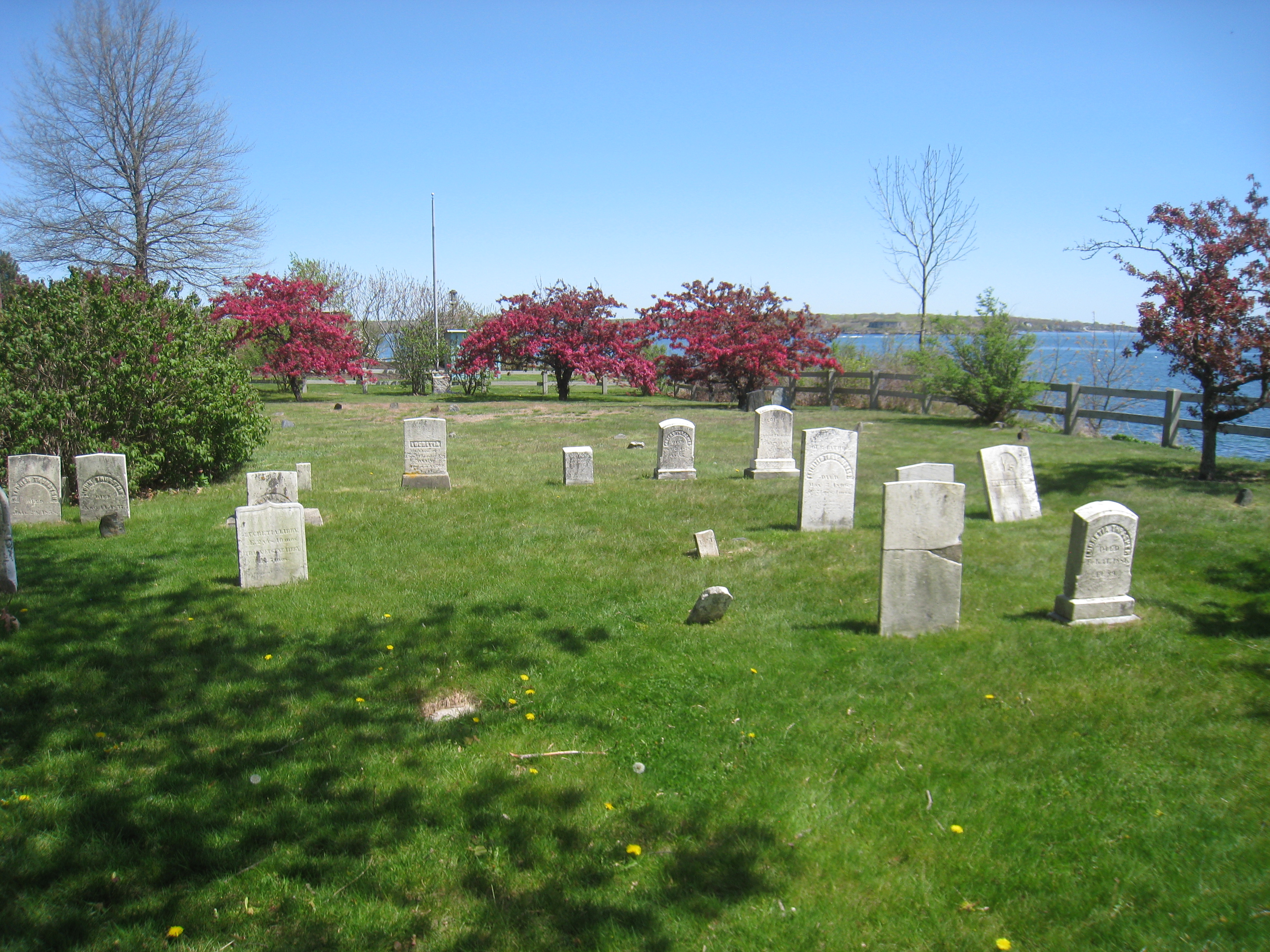
- The cemetery in 2010, looking north over Casco Bay

Details
- Established: 1658 (367 years ago)
- Closed: Yes
- Location: Southern Maine Community College, 100 Campus Center Drive, South Portland, Maine
- Country: United States
- Coordinates: 43.64558°N 70.22763°W
- Type: Historic
- No. of graves: 18
- Find a Grave: Old Settlers Cemetery

Old Settlers Cemetery, also known as Thrasher Cemetery, is a historic cemetery in South Portland, Maine, United States. South Portland's oldest landmark, dating to 1658, it stands today in the grounds of Southern Maine Community College, adjacent to Willard Beach. There are eighteen marked graves in the cemetery, but it is believed there are several more unmarked burials. The oldest visible burial is that of Ann Simonton, a Scot from today's Argyll and Bute, who died in April 1744. Seven headstones are of members of the Thrasher family, hence the cemetery's alternative name.

The cemetery was abandoned around 1678 due to the outbreak of King Philip's War, which forced locals to flee the area. Nine families returned to the area around the turn of the 18th century, but in 1703 twenty-five of them were killed by a local Native American tribe, and an additional eight were captured.

Re-settlement was again attempted in 1716, this time without conflict.

In 1976, to mark the bicentenary of the United States, the cemetery was refurbished by the American Revolution Bicentennial Administration, with landscaping and the installation of a new fence.

The cemetery is maintained, on an annual basis, by students of the college.
