= Chelsea, Maine =

Town in Maine, United States

- Town
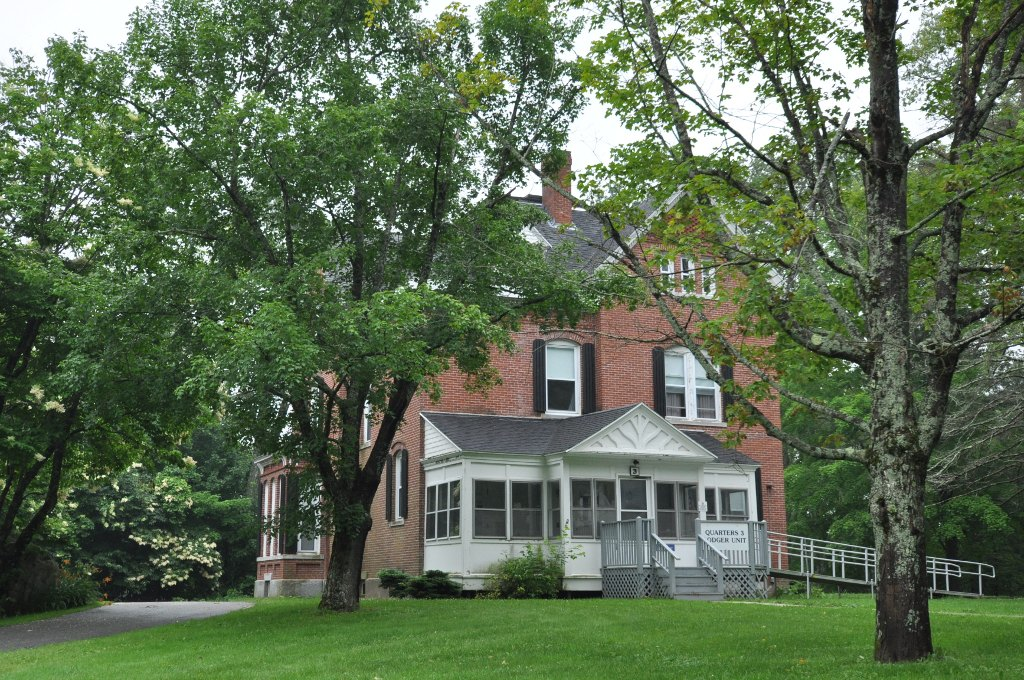
- Togus VA facility, Chelsea, ME

- Seal
- Nickname: Gateway to the Capital
- Location in Kennebec County and the state of Maine
- Coordinates: 44°15′45″N 69°44′10″W
- Country: United States
- State: Maine
- County: Kennebec
- Incorporated: March 1, 1851
- Villages: Chelsea; Chelsea Heights; Togus

Government
  - Type: Board of selectmen

Area
  - Total: 19.98 sq mi (51.75 km^{2})
  - Land: 19.54 sq mi (50.61 km^{2})
  - Water: 0.44 sq mi (1.14 km^{2})
- Elevation: 197 ft (60 m)

Population (2020)
  - Total: 2,778
  - Density: 142/sq mi (54.9/km^{2})
- Time zone: UTC-5 (Eastern (EST))
  - Summer (DST): UTC-4 (EDT)
- ZIP code: 04330
- Area code: 207
- FIPS code: 23-12350
- GNIS feature ID: 582406
- Website: www.chelseamaine.org

Chelsea is a town in Kennebec County, Maine, United States. The population was 2,778 at the 2020 census. It is home to the Togus Springs Hotel and Veterans Administration facilities.

== History ==
Chelsea was incorporated as a town on March 1, 1851, separating from a portion of Hallowell. The town was named after the town of Chelsea, Massachusetts.

== Geography ==
According to the United States Census Bureau, the town has a total area of 19.98 square miles (51.75 km^{2}), of which 19.54 square miles (50.61 km^{2}) is land and 0.44 square miles (1.14 km^{2}) is water. Situated on the east bank of the Kennebec River, Chelsea is bordered on the west by Hallowell, on the north by Augusta, on the southwest by Farmingdale, on the south by Randolph and Pittston, and on the east by Whitefield. Chelsea is considered part of the Augusta, Maine micropolitan New England City and Town Area.

=== Togus ===
The "Togus" neighborhood is located in the northern part of town, near the intersection of Maine State Route 226 and Maine State Route 17. It is six miles equidistant from both Gardiner and Augusta. The term comes from the word Worromontogus, which means "mineral water" in a Native American language.

The Togus area was formerly home to a resort called "Togus Springs", operated by Rockland resident Horace Beals, which lasted from 1859 to 1863; the U.S. federal government bought the land for US$250,000 after the resort failed. Today, the area is to the Governor's House (a house first constructed in 1869), the Togus National Cemetery, and the Togus VA Medical Center.

== Demographics ==
Historical population
Census	Pop.	Note	%±
1860	1,024		—
1870	1,238		20.9%
1880	1,537		24.2%
1890	2,356		53.3%
1900	3,092		31.2%
1910	3,216		4.0%
1920	2,050		−36.3%
1930	2,210		7.8%
1940	2,280		3.2%
1950	2,169		−4.9%
1960	1,893		−12.7%
1970	2,095		10.7%
1980	2,522		20.4%
1990	2,497		−1.0%
2000	2,559		2.5%
2010	2,721		6.3%
2020	2,778		2.1%
U.S. Decennial Census

=== 2020 census ===
As of the census of 2020, there were 2,778 people, 1,028 households, and 773 families living in the town. The population density was 142.2 inhabitants per square mile (54.9/km^{2}). There were 1,067 housing units at an average density of 54.6 of per square mile (21.1/km^{2}). The racial makeup of the town was 92.12% White, 0.43% African American, 0.9% Native American, 0.61% Asian, 0.4% from other races, and 5.54% from two or more races. Hispanic or Latino of an race were 1.08% of the population.

There were 1,028 households, of which 33.9% had children under the age of 18 living with them, 54.1% were married couples living together, 10.0% had a female householder with no husband present, 3.5% had a male householder with no wife present, and 32.4% were non-families. 4.77% of all households were made up of individuals, and 2.24% had someone living alone who was 65 years of age or older. The average household size was 2.61 and the average family size was 2.87.

The median age of the town was 42.2 years. 23.3% of residents were under the age of 18; 7.1% were between the ages of 18 and 24; 24.4% were from 25 to 44; 24.9% were from 45 to 64; and 22.9% were 65 years of age or older. The gender makeup of the town was 50.8% male and 49.2% female.

=== 2010 census ===
As of the census of 2010, there were 2,721 people, 1,046 households, and 758 families living in the town. The population density was 139.3 inhabitants per square mile (53.8/km^{2}). There were 1,113 housing units at an average density of 57.0 per square mile (22.0/km^{2}). The racial makeup of the town was 97.0% White, 0.1% African American, 1.1% Native American, 0.7% Asian, 0.1% Pacific Islander, 0.1% from other races, and 1.0% from two or more races. Hispanic or Latino of any race were 0.8% of the population.

There were 1,046 households, of which 31.0% had children under the age of 18 living with them, 57.0% were married couples living together, 10.2% had a female householder with no husband present, 5.3% had a male householder with no wife present, and 27.5% were non-families. 20.7% of all households were made up of individuals, and 8% had someone living alone who was 65 years of age or older. The average household size was 2.48 and the average family size was 2.80.

The median age in the town was 44.9 years. 20.3% of residents were under the age of 18; 6.8% were between the ages of 18 and 24; 23.3% were from 25 to 44; 35.2% were from 45 to 64; and 14.6% were 65 years of age or older. The gender makeup of the town was 51.6% male and 48.4% female.

=== 2000 census ===
As of the census of 2000, there were 2,559 people, 959 households, and 701 families living in the town. The population density was 131.2 inhabitants per square mile (50.7/km^{2}). There were 1,015 housing units at an average density of 52.0 per square mile (20.1/km^{2}). The racial makeup of the town was 96.99% White, 0.27% African American, 0.98% Native American, 0.78% Asian, 0.08% from other races, and 0.90% from two or more races. Hispanic or Latino of any race were 0.47% of the population.

There were 959 households, out of which 33.7% had children under the age of 18 living with them, 58.7% were married couples living together, 9.0% had a female householder with no husband present, and 26.9% were non-families. 20.4% of all households were made up of individuals, and 7.0% had someone living alone who was 65 years of age or older. The average household size was 2.57 and the average family size was 2.93.

In the town, the population was spread out, with 24.2% under the age of 18, 6.7% from 18 to 24, 29.5% from 25 to 44, 28.1% from 45 to 64, and 11.5% who were 65 years of age or older. The median age was 39 years. For every 100 females, there were 114.0 males. For every 100 females age 18 and over, there were 114.1 males.

The median income for a household in the town was $40,905, and the median income for a family was $44,688. Males had a median income of $30,793 versus $23,781 for females. The per capita income for the town was $17,591. About 13.6% of families and 15.1% of the population were below the poverty line, including 16.0% of those under age 18 and 21.7% of those age 65 or over.

== Notable person ==
- John F. Chase, Civil War hero and inventor
