= Togus National Cemetery =

Historic veterans cemetery in Maine, US

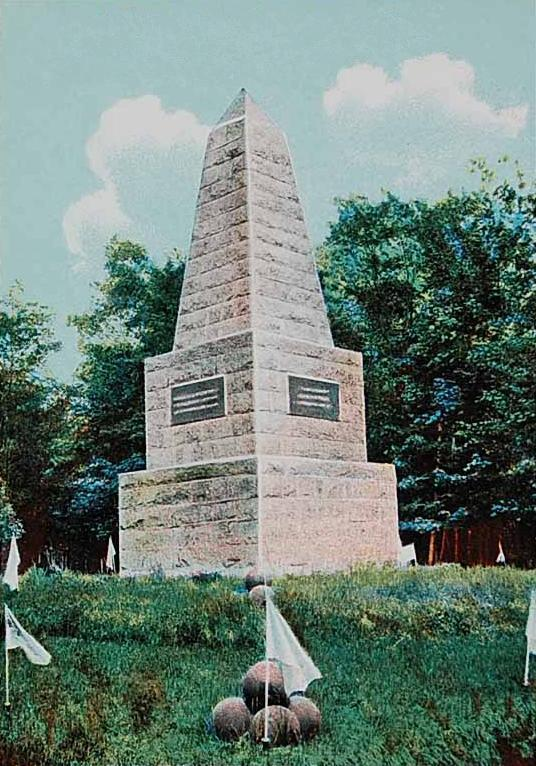
- Soldiers' Monument, established in 1889, as it appeared in about 1906
- Interactive map of Togus National Cemetery

Details
- Established: 1865
- Location: Togus, Maine
- Country: United States
- Coordinates: 44°16′36″N 69°41′49″W
- Type: United States National Cemetery (closed to new interments)
- Size: 31.2 acres (12.6 ha)
- No. of interments: >5,300
- Find a Grave: Togus National Cemetery

Togus National Cemetery is a United States National Cemetery located at Togus, Kennebec County, Maine. Administered by the United States Department of Veterans Affairs, it encompasses 31.2 acres (12.6 ha), and as of the end of 2020, had more than 5,300 interments. It is closed to new interments.

== History ==
Named for an Algonquian Native American word for mineral water, the area the cemetery resides on was formerly a hotel and resort known as Togus Springs. The resort failed as a business due to the outbreak of the Civil War, and its owner died shortly thereafter. The federal government purchased the property for 50,000 dollars and established a veteran care facility. The first veterans were admitted on November 10, 1866. The facility was expanded and eventually had the capacity for 3,000 veterans.

The cemetery itself is divided into two plots, the West Cemetery and the East Cemetery. The older West Cemetery was first established in 1865 and moved to its present location in 1867; it closed for interments in 1936. The East Cemetery was opened in 1936 to provide additional interment space. It was closed for interments in 1961.

== Notable interments ==
- Private David John Scannell, Medal of Honor recipient for action in the Boxer Rebellion.
- John Preston, Medal of Honor recipient for action in the Civil War
