= Jimmy Ellis (boxer) =

American boxer (1940–2014)

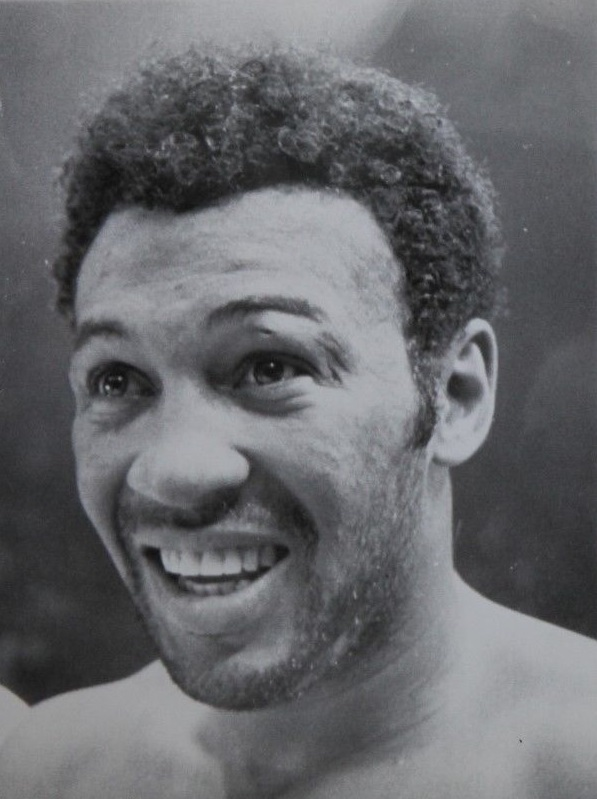
- Ellis in 1968

Personal information
- Born: James Albert Ellis; February 24, 1940 Louisville, Kentucky, U.S.
- Died: May 6, 2014 (aged 74) Louisville, Kentucky, U.S.
- Height: 6 ft 1 in (185 cm)
- Weight: Heavyweight

Boxing career
- Reach: 76 in (193 cm)
- Stance: Orthodox

Boxing record
- Total fights: 53
- Wins: 40
- Win by KO: 24
- Losses: 12
- Draws: 1

James Albert Ellis (February 24, 1940 – May 6, 2014) was an American professional boxer. He won the vacant WBA heavyweight world title in 1968 by defeating Jerry Quarry, making one successful title defense in the same year against Floyd Patterson, before losing to Joe Frazier in 1970.

== Early life ==
He was born one of ten children. His father, Walter, was a pastor, and Ellis was brought up as a Christian. As a teenager he worked in a cement finishing factory. He also sang in the local church choir, later joined by his wife Mary. He continued church involvement all his adult life. In his youth he admired the boxer Joe Louis.

== Amateur career ==
Ellis got into boxing as a teenager after watching a friend box a fellow Louisville youngster Muhammad Ali (then known as Cassius Clay) on a local amateur boxing television show called Tomorrow's Champions. "I had a friend of mine named Donnie Hall, and he fought Ali," Ellis said. "Donnie lost, and I thought I could maybe be a fighter then." Ellis went with Hall to Louisville's Columbia Gym, where the coach was a police officer named Joe Martin.

Ellis won 59 of 66 amateur bouts and was a Golden Gloves champion. He boxed Ali twice as an amateur, with Ali winning the first bout and Ellis winning the second.

== Professional career ==
Ellis turned professional as a middleweight in 1961. Early in his pro career, he was trained and managed by Bud Bruner. With Bruner, he compiled a record of 15–5 (6 KOs). His five losses were decisions to top Middleweight contenders Holly Mims (whom he defeated in a rematch), Henry Hank, Rubin "Hurricane" Carter, Don Fullmer, and George Benton. This seemingly inauspicious start, but against a formidable row of contenders, undoubtedly helped his speed of punch, movement and finesse.

At the end of 1964, after losing three out of four fights, Ellis decided to leave Bruner. He later recalled Bruner fondly. "I liked him, and I fought a lot of top-rated fighters when I was with him, but eventually I had to move on," Ellis said. "He did me justice, and we always remained friends."

Ellis wrote a letter to an at first skeptical Angelo Dundee, the trainer of Ali, and asked him to handle his career. Dundee agreed to be both manager and trainer. Ellis became a sparring partner for Ali and fought on several of Ali's early pre-world championship undercards. Six of his first eight fights with Dundee were on an Ali undercards.

By the mid-1960s, Ellis was fighting heavyweights. Being a tall natural athletic build he'd had increasing trouble keeping down to middleweight. Dr. Ferdie Pacheco, who worked with both Ali and Ellis throughout their careers, called Ellis's development from middleweight to heavyweight one of the most dramatic he could recall.

=== WBA heavyweight title eliminator matches ===
By 1966, Ellis was fighting as a heavyweight. When Ali was stripped of the world title for refusing to enter the military, the World Boxing Association staged an eight-man tournament that featured most of the top heavyweight contenders. Ellis, who was ranked eighth in the world after eight consecutive wins, was invited to be in the tournament. Joe Frazier, ranked second by the WBA, chose not to participate in the tournament. Instead, Frazier fought for the vacant New York State Athletic Commission World Heavyweight Championship, which he won with an eleventh-round knockout of Buster Mathis.

In the opening round of the tournament, Ellis fought Leotis Martin on August 5, 1967, in Houston, Texas. Ellis, the betting underdog, battered Martin's face into a bloody mask, and the referee stopped the fight in the ninth round.

Ellis met Oscar Bonavena in the second round of the tournament. The fight took place on December 2, 1967, in Louisville, Kentucky. Ellis, once again the underdog, dropped Bonavena with a right once in the third round and once in the tenth. After twelve rounds, Ellis was awarded a unanimous decision. This fight was regarded as one of the best of his career. He seemed to be in control for most of the fight apart from the ninth round. Ellis advanced to the tournament final.

=== WBA heavyweight champion ===
In the tournament final, Ellis faced Jerry Quarry, a slight betting favorite, on April 27, 1968, in Oakland, California. Ellis fought what Sports Illustrated called "a tactical masterpiece". A cautious Ellis won a 15-round split decision to capture the vacant WBA Heavyweight Championship. Quarry said, "If they'd given me the decision, I'd have given it back. I didn't deserve it."

=== Title reign ===
In his only successful title defense, Ellis defeated Floyd Patterson by a controversial 15-round decision on September 14, 1968, in Stockholm, Sweden. Ellis, who suffered a broken nose in the second round, was awarded the decision by the referee, the sole judge. Many in the crowd of 30,000 disagreed with the decision and started chanting, "Floyd champ!" The New York Times scored the fight seven rounds to six for Ellis, with two even.

Following the defeat of Patterson, Ellis was out of the ring for seventeen months. He was going to fight Henry Cooper in the United Kingdom, even though the British Boxing Board of Control refused to recognize the fight as a world title bout: the BBBofC was affiliated with the World Boxing Council, who stated that they would only recognize a fight between Joe Frazier and a suitable contender as being for the world title. The fight was postponed a couple of times and eventually cancelled because Cooper injured his knee. Ellis then planned to fight Bob Cleroux in Montreal, but Cleroux lost what was supposed to be a tune-up fight against the lightly regarded Billy Joiner. Finally, Ellis was going to fight Gregorio Peralta in Argentina, but promoters canceled the fight 24 hours before it was to take place because of poor ticket sales.

=== Unification title match with Joe Frazier ===
On February 16, 1970, Ellis fought Joe Frazier to unify the World Heavyweight Championship at Madison Square Garden in New York City. The undefeated Frazier, a heavy betting favorite, proved to be too strong and powerful. Ellis, who had never been floored as a heavyweight, was knocked down twice in the fourth round by a relentless Frazier. At the request of Ellis': trainer Angelo Dundee, the referee stopped the fight before the start of the fifth round. It was the first knockout loss for Ellis.

=== Ellis vs. Ali ===
After winning his next three fights, Ellis fought Muhammad Ali in the Houston Astrodome on July 26, 1971. Angelo Dundee chose to work with Ellis for the fight. He was Ali's trainer, but he was both manager and trainer for Ellis. Working with Ellis meant that he would get a bigger share of the purse. Ali accepted the arrangement and got Harry Wiley, who had worked with Henry Armstrong and Sugar Ray Robinson, to be his trainer for the Ellis fight.

Ellis fought well over the first three rounds, but the fight turned after Ellis was hurt by a right hand in the fourth round. The right hand "hurt me so bad I couldn't really fight my best after that", Ellis said. "It ruined me." The referee stopped the fight in the twelfth round as Ali pummelled Ellis.

=== Diminishing skills ===
After the loss to Ali, Ellis won his next eight fights by knockout. But on June 18, 1973, he fought Earnie Shavers, who was 44–2 (43 KOs), at Madison Square Garden. Ellis, ranked fourth by the WBA, stunned Shavers in the first round with a chopping right to the jaw and backed him into a corner. Shavers took numerous shots in the corner before clinching. After the referee separated the fighters, Shavers put Ellis down for the count with a powerful single right uppercut to the chin. The time was 2:39.

Ellis came back with a knockout win against club fighter Memphis Al Jones, but with his skills in decline, he went winless in his next five fights. He lost a split decision to Boone Kirkman, fought a draw with Larry Middleton, dropped decisions to Ron Lyle and Joe Bugner, and was stopped in nine rounds in a rematch with Joe Frazier.

The rematch with Frazier took place in Melbourne, Australia, on March 2, 1975. Ellis trained at the Golden Bowl Gym in Camberwell, Melbourne, with martial arts 4th Dan Gerry Scaife. Ellis won the first three rounds, but Frazier then picked up the intensity and took control. With Ellis bloody and battered, Angelo Dundee signaled for referee Bob Foster to stop the fight in the ninth round.

=== Retirement ===
On May 6, 1975, in what would be his last fight, Ellis knocked out club fighter Carl Baker in the first round. He retired aged 35 after a training injury left him partially blind in his left eye. Ellis finished his respectable career with a record of 40 wins of which 24 of them came by way of knockout, twelve losses and one draw.

== Later life ==
After retiring from boxing, Ellis trained boxers. Later he worked for the Louisville Parks Department on athletic and recreational projects between 1989 and 2003. In 2004, Ellis told the Washington Times "...All I ever wanted to be was a good fighter and good man." Brother Jeff gave a tribute on his death saying " He was someone you could model yourself on" Ellis was a reserved family man who shunned flash although had a determined competitive streak in boxing.

With wife Mary he had six children: two sons and four daughters. His brother Charles boxed in the 1964 Olympics. Ellis was personally kind and gracious. He maintained a brotherly relationship with Ali over all the decades. Ali himself often recalled Ellis as a great friend. Ellis wasn't always pleased by the sparring partner tag but felt he had proved himself above that.

He lived with dementia pugilistica, for over a decade before his death. It was reported that Ellis's condition was so bad that he believed his deceased wife, Mary, who died in 2006, was still alive.

== Death ==
Ellis died in Louisville Baptist Hospital, Kentucky at the age of 74 from complications of dementia on May 6, 2014, 39 years exactly after his last boxing match. His funeral was held on May 12, 2014, at Louisville's Canaan Christian Church and he was buried in Green Meadows Memorial Cemetery. On the announcement of Ellis's death, Muhammad Ali issued the following statement: "In the world of heavyweights I always thought of him as one of the best".

== Personal life ==
His son Jeff played professional football and confirmed the family were always immensely proud of Ellis's achievements and his World Title. Ellis's family considered that boxing exacerbated the dementia of his later years, but had not necessarily caused it. His younger brother Jerry, who had trained with Ellis, commented that he avoided watching boxing in his later years as he had seen too many people damaged by it.

== Professional boxing record ==
53 fights	40 wins	12 losses
By knockout	24	4
By decision	16	8
Draws	1	

No.	Result	Record	Opponent	Type	Round, time	Date	Location	Notes
53	Win	40–12–1	Carl Baker	KO	1 (10), 2:48	May 6, 1975	Sports Stadium, Orlando, Florida, U.S.	
52	Loss	39–12–1	Joe Frazier	TKO	9 (12), 0:59	Mar 2, 1975	Junction Oval, Melbourne, Australia	
51	Loss	39–11–1	Joe Bugner	PTS	10	Nov 12, 1974	Empire Pool, London, England	
50	Loss	39–10–1	Ron Lyle	UD	12	Jul 16, 1974	Denver, Colorado, U.S.	
49	Draw	39–9–1	Larry Middleton	SD	10	Mar 4, 1974	Capital Centre, Landover, Maryland, U.S.	
48	Loss	39–9	Boone Kirkman	SD	10	Dec 12, 1973	Center Coliseum, Seattle, Washington, U.S.	
47	Win	39–8	Al Jones	TKO	7 (10)	Oct 23, 1973	Municipal Auditorium, Atlanta, Georgia, U.S.	
46	Loss	38–8	Earnie Shavers	KO	1 (10), 2:39	Jun 18, 1973	Madison Square Garden, New York City, New York, U.S.	
45	Win	38–7	Rico Brooks	KO	5 (10), 0:48	May 5, 1973	Phoenix, Arizona, U.S.	
44	Win	37–7	Joe Tiger Harris	KO	2 (10)	Apr 14, 1973	Huntington, West Virginia, U.S.	
43	Win	36–7	Charlie Harris	TKO	1 (10), 1:48	Mar 6, 1973	Municipal Auditorium, Miami Beach, Florida, U.S.	
42	Win	35–7	Bob Felstein	KO	2 (10), 2:48	Feb 21, 1973	Sports Stadium, Orlando, Florida, U.S.	
41	Win	34–7	Harold Carter	TKO	7 (10), 0:37	Oct 26, 1972	Raleigh County Armory, Beckley, West Virginia, U.S.	
40	Win	33–7	Ollie Wilson	TKO	6 (10)	Sep 21, 1972	St. Josaphat Auditorium, Parma, Ohio, U.S.	
39	Win	32–7	Rico Brooks	KO	2 (10), 2:50	Jun 13, 1972	Marine Stadium, Miami, Florida, U.S.	
38	Win	31–7	Dick Gosha	TKO	6 (10), 2:55	May 16, 1972	Center Arena, Seattle, Washington, U.S.	
37	Loss	30–7	Muhammad Ali	TKO	12 (12), 2:10	Jul 26, 1971	Astrodome, Houston, Texas, U.S.	For vacant NABF heavyweight title
36	Win	30–6	George Chuvalo	UD	10	May 10, 1971	Maple Leaf Gardens, Toronto, Ontario, Canada	
35	Win	29–6	Tony Doyle	KO	10 (10), 2:42	Mar 2, 1971	Municipal Auditorium, Miami Beach, Florida, U.S.	
34	Win	28–6	Roberto Davila	TKO	7 (10), 2:26	Nov 10, 1970	Municipal Auditorium, Miami Beach, Florida, U.S.	
33	Loss	27–6	Joe Frazier	RTD	4 (15), 3:00	Feb 16, 1970	Madison Square Garden, New York City, New York, U.S.	Lost WBA heavyweight title; For NYSAC and vacant WBC heavyweight titles
32	Win	27–5	Floyd Patterson	PTS	15	Sep 14, 1968	Råsunda Stadium, Stockholm, Sweden	Retained WBA heavyweight title
31	Win	26–5	Jerry Quarry	MD	15	Apr 27, 1968	County Coliseum Arena, Oakland, California, U.S.	Won vacant WBA heavyweight title WBA Heavyweight Title elimination series; final
30	Win	25–5	Oscar Bonavena	UD	12	Dec 2, 1967	Freedom Hall, Louisville, Kentucky, U.S.	WBA Heavyweight Title elimination tournament; semi-final
29	Win	24–5	Leotis Martin	TKO	9 (12), 1:43	Aug 5, 1967	Astrodome, Houston, Texas, U.S.	WBA Heavyweight Title elimination tournament; quarter-final
28	Win	23–5	Johnny Persol	KO	1 (10), 2:44	Mar 22, 1967	Madison Square Garden, New York City, New York, U.S.	
27	Win	22–5	Tommy Sims	KO	1 (6), 2:38	Nov 14, 1966	Astrodome, Houston, Texas, U.S.	
26	Win	21–5	Eddie Dembry	KO	1 (8), 2:18	Oct 27, 1966	State Fairgrounds, Louisville, Kentucky, U.S.	
25	Win	20–5	Billy Daniels	PTS	6	Sep 10, 1966	Waldstadion, Frankfurt, West Germany	
24	Win	19–5	Leweni Waqa	KO	1 (10)	May 21, 1966	Arsenal Stadium, London, England	
23	Win	18–5	Hubert Hilton	PTS	8	Mar 29, 1966	Maple Leaf Gardens, Toronto, Ontario, Canada	
22	Win	17–5	Chuck Leslie	UD	10	Nov 15, 1965	Hacienda, Paradise, Nevada, U.S.	
21	Win	16–5	Joe Blackwood	KO	1	May 25, 1965	Central Maine Youth Center, Lewiston, Maine, U.S.	
20	Loss	15–5	George Benton	MD	10	Nov 30, 1964	Philadelphia Arena, Philadelphia, Pennsylvania, U.S.	
19	Loss	15–4	Don Fullmer	SD	10	Oct 21, 1964	Convention Center, Louisville, Kentucky, U.S.	
18	Win	15–3	Joe Spencer	KO	1 (8), 1:49	Apr 21, 1964	Phoenix Hotel Ballroom, Lexington, Kentucky, U.S.	
17	Loss	14–3	Rubin Carter	UD	10	Feb 28, 1964	Madison Square Garden, New York City, New York, U.S.	
16	Win	14–2	Luis Gutierrez	PTS	10	Sep 27, 1963	Convention Center, Louisville, Kentucky, U.S.	
15	Win	13–2	Johnny Halafihi	KO	1 (10)	Jun 18, 1963	Wembley Stadium, London, England	
14	Win	12–2	LeRoy Green	UD	10	Dec 3, 1962	Columbia Gym Arena, Louisville, Kentucky, U.S.	
13	Loss	11–2	Henry Hank	UD	10	Sep 1, 1962	Freedom Hall, Louisville, Kentucky, U.S.	
12	Win	11–1	Charlie Glover	PTS	4	Jun 13, 1962	Phoenix Hotel Ballroom, Lexington, Kentucky, U.S.	
11	Win	10–1	Sammy Poe	PTS	4	Jun 13, 1962	Phoenix Hotel Ballroom, Lexington, Kentucky, U.S.	
10	Win	9–1	Rudolph Bent	TKO	2 (10), 1:17	Jun 7, 1962	State Fairgrounds, Louisville, Kentucky, U.S.	
9	Win	8–1	Holley Mims	UD	10	May 4, 1962	Freedom Hall, Louisville, Kentucky, U.S.	
8	Win	7–1	Johnny Alford	MD	6	Feb 17, 1962	Madison Square Garden, New York City, New York, U.S.	
7	Win	6–1	Rory Calhoun	KO	1 (10), 1:47	Jan 11, 1962	Jefferson County Armory, Louisville, Kentucky, U.S.	
6	Loss	5–1	Holley Mims	UD	10	Nov 29, 1961	Freedom Hall, Louisville, Kentucky, U.S.	
5	Win	5–0	Clarence Riley	RTD	1 (8), 3:00	Oct 7, 1961	Freedom Hall, Louisville, Kentucky, U.S.	
4	Win	4–0	Wilf Greaves	MD	10	Aug 22, 1961	Fairgrounds Stadium, Louisville, Kentucky, U.S.	
3	Win	3–0	Johnny Morris	SD	6	Jul 22, 1961	Freedom Hall, Louisville, Kentucky, U.S.	
2	Win	2–0	Gene Leslie	UD	8	May 6, 1961	Jefferson County Armory, Louisville, Kentucky, U.S.	
1	Win	1–0	Arley Seifer	TKO	3 (6), 1:15	Apr 19, 1961	Freedom Hall, Louisville, Kentucky, U.S.	Professional debut

== Exhibition boxing record ==
9 fights	0 wins	0 losses
Non-scored	9	

No.	Result	Record	Opponent	Type	Round, time	Date	Location	Notes
9	—N/a	0-0 (9)	(United States) Muhammad Ali	—N/a	?	Dec 1, 1982	(United Arab Emirates) Sheikh Zayed Stadium, Abu Dhabi, U.A.E.	Non-scored bout
8	—N/a	0-0 (8)	(United States) Muhammad Ali	—N/a	5	Jan 31, 1980	Madras, India	Non-scored bout
7	—N/a	0-0 (7)	(United States) Muhammad Ali	—N/a	5	Jun 7, 1979	(United Kingdom) Odeon Theatre, Birmingham, England	Non-scored bout
6	—N/a	0-0 (6)	(United States) Muhammad Ali	—N/a	5	May 27, 1979	Randershallen, Randers, Denmark	Non-scored bout
5	—N/a	0-0 (5)	(United States) Muhammad Ali	—N/a	2	Mar 12, 1979	(United States) Providence Civic Center, Providence, Rhode Island, U.S.	Non-scored bout
4	—N/a	0-0 (4)	(United States) Muhammad Ali	—N/a	?	Feb 8, 1979	Western Springs, Auckland, New Zealand	Non-scored bout
3	—N/a	0–0 (3)	(United States) Muhammad Ali	—N/a	4	Aug 20, 1965	(United Kingdom) London, England	Non-scored bout
2	—N/a	0–0 (2)	(United States) Muhammad Ali	—N/a	2	Aug 16, 1965	Nya Ullevi, Gothenburg, Sweden	Non-scored bout
1	—N/a	0–0 (1)	(United States) Muhammad Ali	—N/a	3	Jul 31, 1965	San Juan, Puerto Rico	Non-scored bout

Sporting positions
Regional boxing titles
Vacant Title last held by Muhammad Ali	WBA heavyweight champion April 27, 1968 – February 16, 1970	Succeeded by Joe Frazier
