= George Benton =

American fighter and boxing instructor

Personal information
- Nickname: The Mayor of North Philadelphia
- Born: May 15, 1933 Philadelphia, Pennsylvania, U.S.
- Died: September 19, 2011 (aged 78)

Boxing career
- Stance: Orthodox

George Benton (May 15, 1933 – September 19, 2011) was an American boxer and boxing trainer from Philadelphia, Pennsylvania.

== Boxing career ==
=== Fighting ===
His first amateur bout was when he was thirteen. He turned professional three years later. He boxed professionally from 1949 to 1970 and defeated future world champions Freddie Little, Jimmy Ellis, and Joey Giardello. In seventy-six professional fights, he was never knocked down and was stopped just twice, on a cut against Luis Manuel Rodriguez and when he didn't come out for the final round of his fight with Bennie Briscoe. Benton had a professional record of 62–13–1 (37 KOs).

Benton became the #1 ranked middleweight in the world in the early 1960s, but he never got a shot at the world title. In 1962, after he beat Giardello, Benton thought that he would get a title shot. However, Giardello's manager, Lou Duva, was well connected and was able to get Giardello a fight with Dick Tiger for the World Middleweight Championship, which Giardello won by decision. "Yeah, I screwed George out of his shot," Duva said. "He didn't even know about it till I told him many years later."

Benton's boxing career ended in 1970 after he was shot. The shooter had tried to pick up Benton's sister in a bar, and Benton's brother beat him up. Vowing to kill someone from the Benton family, the man shot George in the back. He was in and out of the hospital for two years. The bullet remained lodged near Benton's spine for the remainder of his life.

=== Training ===
With his boxing career over, he turned to training. He studied under Eddie Futch and was in Joe Frazier's corner for his third fight with Muhammad Ali, the Thrilla in Manila. He was also in the corner of Leon Spinks when he upset Ali to win the World Heavyweight Championship.

For seventeen years, Benton worked with Lou Duva and the Duva family's promotion company, Main Events, as the head trainer for many of their fighters. Among the fighters he trained were Evander Holyfield, Oliver McCall, Mike McCallum, Meldrick Taylor, and Pernell Whitaker. Also he coached Marvis Frazier during his amateur career.

== Fighting style ==
Benton was known for his incredible defense. Boxer Jimmy Collins once said, “You couldn't hit him with a handful of rice.” He is credited with popularizing a variety of the crab style known as the Philly Shell, named for its use among Philadelphia fighters. Benton not only used this style throughout his career, but also taught it to Boxers he trained such as Pernell Whitaker.

== Personal life ==
Benton died on September 19, 2011, after a battle with pneumonia. A veteran of the United States Army, he was buried at the Washington Crossing National Cemetery in Upper Makefield Township, Pennsylvania.

== Legacy ==
In 1989 and 1990, Benton was named "Trainer of the Year" by the Boxing Writers Association of America.

In 2001, he was elected to the International Boxing Hall Of Fame.

== Professional boxing record ==
75 fights	61 wins	13 losses
By knockout	36	2
By decision	25	11
Draws	1	

No.	Result	Record	Opponent	Type	Round	Date,	Age	Location	Notes
75	Loss	61–13–1	Juarez de Lima	UD	10	Apr 3, 1970	36 years, 323 days	Felt Forum, New York City, New York, U.S.	
74	Win	61–12–1	Eddie Owens	UD	10	Mar 25, 1970	36 years, 314 days	Blue Horizon, Philadelphia, Pennsylvania, U.S.	
73	Win	60–12–1	David Beckles	KO	1 (10)	Jan 13, 1970	36 years, 243 days	Blue Horizon, Philadelphia, Pennsylvania, U.S.	
72	Win	59–12–1	Juarez de Lima	SD	10	May 1, 1969	35 years, 351 days	Arena, Philadelphia, Pennsylvania, U.S.	
71	Win	58–12–1	Bobby Warthen	TKO	1 (10)	Sep 24, 1968	35 years, 132 days	Arena, Philadelphia, Pennsylvania, U.S.	
70	Win	57–12–1	Danny Garcia	TKO	2 (10)	Apr 15, 1968	34 years, 336 days	Arena, Philadelphia, Pennsylvania, U.S.	
69	Win	56–12–1	Oscar Freeman	KO	2 (10)	Mar 11, 1968	34 years, 301 days	Arena, Philadelphia, Pennsylvania, U.S.	
68	Win	55–12–1	Hilton Whitaker	KO	8 (10)	Nov 9, 1966	33 years, 178 days	Arena, Philadelphia, Pennsylvania, U.S.	
67	Win	54–12–1	Dick Young	KO	4 (10)	Oct 2, 1966	33 years, 140 days	Arena, Philadelphia, Pennsylvania, U.S.	
66	Loss	53–12–1	Bennie Briscoe	RTD	9 (10)	Dec 5, 1966	33 years, 204 days	Arena, Philadelphia, Pennsylvania, U.S.	
65	Loss	53–11–1	Milo Calhoun	UD	10	Aug 25, 1966	33 years, 102 days	Exposition Building, Portland, Maine, U.S.	
64	Loss	53–10–1	Luis Manuel Rodriguez	TKO	9 (10)	Mar 7, 1966	32 years, 296 days	Arena, Philadelphia, Pennsylvania, U.S.	
63	Win	53–9–1	Larry Barrett	TKO	6 (10)	Apr 12, 1965	31 years, 332 days	Philadelphia A.C., Philadelphia, Pennsylvania, U.S.	
62	Win	52–9–1	Jimmy Ellis	MD	10	Nov 30, 1964	31 years, 199 days	Arena, Philadelphia, Pennsylvania, U.S.	
61	Win	51–9–1	Johnny Morris	SD	12	May 18, 1964	31 years, 3 days	Arena, Philadelphia, Pennsylvania, U.S.	Won USA Pennsylvania State middleweight title
60	Win	50–9–1	Ernest Burford	KO	4 (10)	Mar 16, 1964	30 years, 306 days	Arena, Philadelphia, Pennsylvania, U.S.	
59	Loss	49–9–1	Johnny Morris	UD	10	Nov 19, 1963	30 years, 188 days	Civic Arena, Pittsburgh, Pennsylvania, U.S.	For USA Pennsylvania State middleweight title
58	Win	49–8–1	John Henry Smith	KO	2 (10)	Aug 31, 1963	30 years, 108 days	Olympic Auditorium, Los Angeles, California, U.S.	
57	Win	48–8–1	Allen Thomas	UD	10	Jul 20, 1963	30 years, 66 days	Madison Square Garden, New York City, New York, U.S.	
56	Loss	47–8–1	Rubin Carter	SD	10	May 25, 1963	30 years, 10 days	Madison Square Garden, New York City, New York, U.S.	
55	Win	47–7–1	Clarence Riley	TKO	6 (10)	Apr 4, 1963	29 years, 324 days	Blue Horizon, Philadelphia, Pennsylvania, U.S.	
54	Win	46–7–1	Clarence Alford	TKO	3 (10)	Mar 7, 1963	30 years, 188 days	Blue Horizon, Philadelphia, Pennsylvania, U.S.	
53	Win	45–7–1	Allan Harmon	TKO	8 (10)	Nov 19, 1962	29 years, 188 days	Arena, Philadelphia, Pennsylvania, U.S.	
52	Win	44–7–1	Joey Giardello	UD	10	Aug 6, 1962	29 years, 83 days	Convention Hall, Philadelphia, Pennsylvania, U.S.	
51	Win	43–7–1	Jesse Smith	UD	10	May 28, 1962	29 years, 13 days	Convention Hall, Philadelphia, Pennsylvania, U.S.	
50	Win	42–7–1	Rudolph Bent	KO	2 (10)	Apr 12, 1962	28 years, 332 days	Blue Horizon, Philadelphia, Pennsylvania, U.S.	
49	Win	41–7–1	Eddie Thompson	TKO	8 (10)	Mar 8, 1962	28 years, 297 days	Blue Horizon, Philadelphia, Pennsylvania, U.S.	
48	Win	40–7–1	Joe Louis Adair	KO	4 (10)	Feb 8, 1962	28 years, 269 days	Blue Horizon, Philadelphia, Pennsylvania, U.S.	
47	Win	39–7–1	Chico Corsey	TKO	3 (8)	Nov 3, 1961	28 years, 172 days	Blue Horizon, Philadelphia, Pennsylvania, U.S.	
46	Loss	38–7–1	John McCormack	PTS	10	Nov 2, 1960	27 years, 171 days	Ice Rink, Paisley, Scotland, U.K.	
45	Win	38–6–1	Freddie Little	MD	10	Oct 18, 1960	27 years, 156 days	Municipal Auditorium, New Orleans, Louisiana, U.S.	
44	Win	37–6–1	Gene Washington	TKO	9 (10)	Dec 10, 1959	26 years, 209 days	Alhambra A.C., Philadelphia, Pennsylvania, U.S.	
43	Loss	36–6–1	Henry Hank	UD	10	Oct 26, 1959	26 years, 164 days	Municipal Auditorium, New Orleans, Florida, U.S.	
42	Loss	36–5–1	Holly Mims	UD	10	Jul 15, 1959	26 years, 61 days	Auditorium, Miami Beach, Florida, U.S.	
41	Win	36–4–1	Bobby Boyd	UD	10	May 18, 1959	26 years, 3 days	Arena, Philadelphia, Pennsylvania, U.S.	
40	Win	35–4–1	Young Beau Jack	KO	1 (10)	Feb 16, 1959	25 years, 277 days	Convention Hall, Philadelphia, Pennsylvania, U.S.	
39	Loss	34–4–1	Charley Joseph	UD	10	Nov 17, 1958	25 years, 186 days	Coliseum Arena, New Orleans, Louisiana, U.S.	
38	Win	34–3–1	Charley Joseph	UD	10	Aug 26, 1958	25 years, 103 days	Coliseum Arena, New Orleans, Louisiana, U.S.	
37	Loss	33–3–1	Willie Dockery	SD	10	Jul 7, 1958	25 years, 53 days	St. Nicholas Arena, New York City, New York, U.S.	
36	Win	33–2–1	Jim Robinson	KO	4 (8)	Jun 12, 1958	25 years, 28 days	Connie Mack Stadium, Philadelphia, Pennsylvania, U.S.	
35	Win	32–2–1	Archie Whitfield	TKO	6 (6)	Apr 16, 1958	24 years, 336 days	Chicago Stadium, Chicago, Illinois, U.S.	
34	Win	31–2–1	Clarence Hinnant	MD	8	Oct 21, 1954	21 years, 159 days	Coliseum Arena, New Orleans, Louisiana, U.S.	
33	Win	30–2–1	Clarence Hinnant	SD	8	Sep 30, 1954	21 years, 138 days	Coliseum Arena, New Orleans, Louisiana, U.S.	
32	Win	29–2–1	Joe Dorsey	TKO	7 (10)	May 2, 1954	20 years, 352 days	Coliseum Arena, New Orleans, Louisiana, U.S.	
31	Draw	28–2–1	Leroy Coleman	PTS	8	May 14, 1954	20 years, 364 days	Madison Square Garden, New York City, New York, U.S.	
30	Win	28–2	Charolito Spirituano	UD	10	Apr 27, 1954	20 years, 347 days	Auditorium, Miami Beach, Florida, U.S.	
29	Win	27–2	Bobby Jones	SD	10	Dec 28, 1953	20 years, 227 days	Eastern Parkway Arena, New York City, New York, U.S.	
28	Win	26–2	Jimmy Franklin	TKO	6 (8)	Aug 13, 1953	20 years, 90 days	Toppi Stadium, Philadelphia, Pennsylvania, U.S.	
27	Win	25–2	Chuck Goldsby	UD	8	Jul 23, 1953	20 years, 69 days	Toppi Stadium, Philadelphia, Pennsylvania, U.S.	
26	Loss	24–2	Joe Blackwood	MD	10	Mar 24, 1953	19 years, 313 days	Auditorium, Miami Beach, Florida, U.S.	
25	Win	24–1	Lester Felton	PTS	8	Jan 27, 1953	19 years, 257 days	Arena, Philadelphia, Pennsylvania, U.S.	
24	Win	23–1	Bobby Lee	TKO	6 (10)	Jan 20, 1953	19 years, 250 days	Auditorium, Miami Beach, Florida, U.S.	
23	Win	22–1	Charley Joseph	UD	10	Dec 23, 1952	19 years, 222 days	Auditorium, Miami Beach, Florida, U.S.	
22	Win	21–1	Leroy Coleman	TKO	3 (6)	Dec 8, 1952	19 years, 207 days	Arena, Trenton, New Jersey, U.S.	
21	Win	20–1	Jackie Burke	TKO	6 (6)	Jun 5, 1952	19 years, 21 days	Municipal Stadium, Philadelphia, Pennsylvania, U.S.	
20	Win	19–1	Moses Ward	TKO	5 (8)	Mar 26, 1952	18 years, 316 days	Chicago Stadium, Chicago, Illinois, U.S.	
19	Win	18–1	Bobby Rosado	KO	4 (6)	Mar 21, 1952	18 years, 311 days	Madison Square Garden, New York City, New York, U.S.	
18	Win	17–1	Holly Mims	UD	8	Jan 10, 1952	18 years, 240 days	Metropolitan Opera House, Philadelphia, Pennsylvania, U.S.	
17	Win	16–1	Chuck Goldsby	KO	3 (8)	Nov 29, 1951	18 years, 198 days	Metropolitan Opera House, Philadelphia, Pennsylvania, U.S.	
16	Win	15–1	Georgie Johnson	KO	5 (?)	Oct 11, 1951	18 years, 149 days	City Auditorium, Atlantic City, New Jersey, U.S.	
15	Win	14–1	Buddy Newby	TKO	2 (6)	Aug 24, 1951	18 years, 101 days	Convention Hall, Atlantic City, New Jersey, U.S.	
14	Win	13–1	Emmett Norris	TKO	6 (8)	Jul 2, 1951	18 years, 48 days	Toppi Stadium, Philadelphia, Pennsylvania, U.S.	
13	Win	12–1	Van Butler	PTS	6	Jun 11, 1951	18 years, 27 days	Toppi Stadium, Philadelphia, Pennsylvania, U.S.	
12	Win	11–1	Jimmy Moore	KO	1 (6)	Apr 19, 1951	17 years, 339 days	Metropolitan Opera House, Philadelphia, Pennsylvania, U.S.	
11	Win	10–1	Jetson Arnold	PTS	8	Apr 16, 1951	17 years, 336 days	Arena, Philadelphia, Pennsylvania, U.S.	
10	Win	9–1	Billy Whye	PTS	6	Mar 5, 1951	17 years, 355 days	Arena, Philadelphia, Pennsylvania, U.S.	
9	Win	8–1	Al Niang	RTD	1 (6)	Feb 6, 1951	17 years, 267 days	Arena, Trenton, New Jersey, U.S.	
8	Loss	7–1	Al Mobley	PTS	6	Jun 5, 1950	17 years, 21 days	Municipal Stadium, Philadelphia, Pennsylvania, U.S.	
7	Win	7–0	Frank Gubas	TKO	2 (6)	May 15, 1950	17 years, 0 days	Arena, New Haven, Connecticut, U.S.	
6	Win	6–0	Bucky Slocum	UD	6	Feb 2, 1950	16 years, 263 days	Metropolitan Opera House, Philadelphia, Pennsylvania, U.S.	
5	Win	5–0	Gene Landers	PTS	6	Jan 5, 1950	16 years, 235 days	Metropolitan Opera House, Philadelphia, Pennsylvania, U.S.	
4	Win	4–0	Dave Peters	UD	6	Nov 21, 1949	16 years, 190 days	Valley Arena, Holyoke, Massachusetts, U.S.	
3	Win	3–0	Dave Peters	TKO	5 (6)	Nov 3, 1949	16 years, 172 days	Metropolitan Opera House, Philadelphia, Pennsylvania, U.S.	
2	Win	2–0	Whitman Dorsch	PTS	4	Aug 8, 1949	16 years, 85 days	Toppi Stadium, Philadelphia, Pennsylvania, U.S.	
1	Win	1–0	Chico Wade	KO	1 (4)	Jul 18, 1949	16 years, 64 days	Toppi Stadium, Philadelphia, Pennsylvania, U.S.	
