= Vincent DeSimone =

American police detective

- Born: 1918
- Died: October 30, 1979 (aged 61); Paterson, New Jersey, U.S.
- Occupations: Police detective; prison warden
- Known for: Role in the prosecution of Rubin Carter

Vincent J. DeSimone, Jr. (1918 – October 30, 1979) was the chief of detectives of Passaic County, New Jersey, USA. In 1966, he was the lead detective who coached witnesses in the homicide case at Lafayette Grill in Paterson, New Jersey, in to implicate boxer Rubin "Hurricane" Carter and John Artis. Carter and Artis were ultimately convicted and served nearly two decades in prison before the convictions were overturned in 1985.

DeSimone's handling of eyewitnesses was criticized for its failure to maintain impartiality and the federal court later wrote about the improper treatment of key witness Alfred Bello by the police: "[Bello's] motivation was crystallized when, shortly after the trial, police officers and others tried to help him obtain a $10,000 reward offered to persons providing information that led to the arrest and conviction of the Lafayette Bar killers."

In 1969, he resigned from his job as the result of a dispute about the way that a murder investigation was being handled (which was, according to an unnamed county attorney quoted in his obituary, "the only thing that a respectable law enforcement man could do" in the situation), and for a year worked as warden of the Passaic County jail, until he was re-hired by a new county prosecutor.

The character Sergeant Della Pesca, based on Vincent DeSimone, was played by Dan Hedaya in the 1999 film, The Hurricane.
