= Lesra Martin =

Canadian lawyer

- Born: April 11, 1963 (age 63); New York City, New York, U.S.
- Occupations: Lawyer; Motivational Speaker; Writer
- Known for: Helping to bring about the release of boxer Rubin "The Hurricane" Carter

Lesra Martin (born April 11, 1963) is an American-Canadian lawyer, motivational speaker and writer. He is best-known for helping to bring about the release of former boxer Rubin "The Hurricane" Carter.

== Rubin "The Hurricane" Carter ==
Martin is notable for his involvement in the release of former boxer Rubin "The Hurricane" Carter. In 1985 Carter had served almost 20 years in prison for a 1966 triple murder for which Carter claimed innocence (he was twice convicted by juries with clear racial bias). Martin’s involvement began after he read Carter's autobiography The Sixteenth Round. Martin wrote to Carter in prison in 1980 and met with him at the prison where he was incarcerated in Trenton, New Jersey. This meeting resulted in the involvement of the group with whom Martin lived in Toronto in the pursuit of Carter's release.

Although Carter was convicted at a retrial in 1976 and lost his appeals from that further conviction, a further proceeding was commenced in February 1985 at a federal court which resulted in his release in November that year by Judge H. Lee Sarokin, who ruled that the case was based on racism and the withholding of evidence that could have helped Carter.

== In the media ==
The story of Carter's release, including Martin's involvement, is portrayed in the film The Hurricane (1999), although extensive portions of the account are fictionalized; Martin is portrayed in the film by Vicellous Reon Shannon.

Martin has appeared on The Oprah Winfrey Show and Larry King Live, and was the subject of the National Film Board The Journey of Lesra Martin, directed by Cheryl Foggo and produced by Selwyn Jacob.

== Sources ==
- Kalish, Jon (September 26, 2006). "The Homeboy and the Hurricane". Soundprint. Archived from the original on September 26, 2006.
