= Cassius Clay vs. Willi Besmanoff =

1961 boxing match

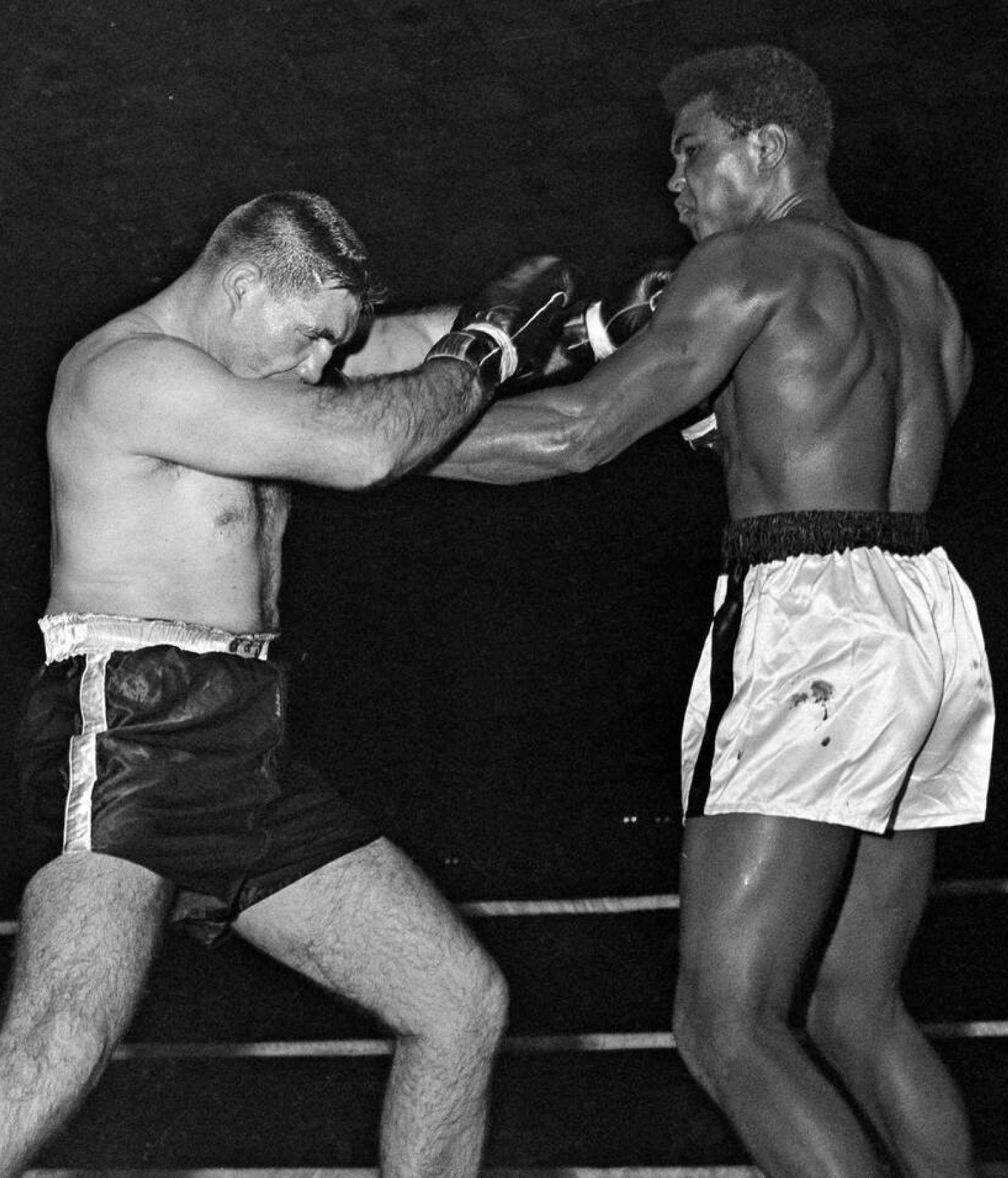
- Date: November 29, 1961
- Venue: Freedom Hall, Louisville, Kentucky

Tale of the tape
Boxer	(United States) Cassius Clay	(West Germany) Willi Besmanoff
Nickname	"The Louisville Lip"	
Hometown	Louisville, Kentucky, U.S.	Munich, Bayern, West Germany
Pre-fight record	9–0 (6 KO)	44–27–7 (16 KO)
Age	19 years, 10 months	29 years, 1 month
Height	6 ft 3 in (191 cm)	5 ft 11 in (180 cm)
Weight	193 lb (88 kg)	205 1/4 lb (93 kg)
Style	Orthodox	Orthodox
Recognition	1960 Olympic light heavyweight Gold Medallist	

Result
- Clay won by TKO in 7st round (1:55)

Cassius Clay vs. Willi Besmanoff was a professional boxing match contested on November 29, 1961.

== Background ==
In the co-feature Holley Mims faced James Ellis in scheduled 10 rounder.

== The fight ==
Clay won the bout through a technical knockout in the seventh round after the referee stopped the fight with Besmanoff sprawled on his back on the canvas.

== Aftermath ==
Speaking after the bout Clay would say that his speed is the asset in which he has the greatest confidence telling reporters "Guys just can't see it. They underestimate my ability".

== Undercard ==
Confirmed bouts:

Preceded by vs. Alex Miteff	Cassius Clay's bouts 29 November 1961	Succeeded by vs. Sonny Banks
Preceded by vs. Alejandro Lavorante	Willi Besmanoff's bouts 29 November 1961	Succeeded by vs. Herb Siler
