= David McCallum (disambiguation) =

David McCallum (1933–2023) was a Scottish actor and musician.

David McCallum may also refer to:

- David McCallum Sr. (1897–1972), musician, father of David McCallum
- David McCallum (sound editor), Canadian sound designer
- David McCallum (wrongful conviction)
