= Vicellous Reon Shannon =

American actor and producer (born 1971)

- Born: April 11, 1971 (age 55); Memphis, Tennessee, U.S.
- Other name: Vicellous Shannon
- Occupations: Actor, producer
- Years active: 1991–present

Vicellous Reon Shannon (born April 11, 1971) is an American actor known for his portrayal of Lesra Martin in the 1999 film The Hurricane, and of Keith Palmer in the Fox television series 24. Shannon also appeared in the 2006 film Annapolis.

== Background ==
Shannon was born in Memphis, Tennessee, and raised in Orange County, California. He was a promising high school baseball player until he was sidelined by a severely injured hamstring. As a result, he took an interest in acting and began taking the two-hour bus ride to Laguna Niguel, where he studied drama, performing chores at the facility in lieu of tuition. His breakthrough role came a few years later in the television series Dangerous Minds.

== Personal life ==
He has two daughters, Sierra (b. 2000) and Serena (b. 2003).

== Filmography ==
=== Film ===
Year	Title	Role	Notes
1992	Deep Cover	13 Year Old	
1994	D2: The Mighty Ducks	James	
1998	Senseless	Carter	
1998	Can't Hardly Wait	Reddi Whip Kid	
1999	The Hurricane	Lesra Martin	
1999	2 Little, 2 Late	Seth 'Crystal' Meth	
2000	Dancing in September	James	
2002	Hart's War	Lt. Lamar T. Archer	
2004	Last Flight Out	Jim	
2005	Shackles	Sammy One	
2006	Annapolis	Twins	
2008	Animal 2	Darius	
2017	The Recall	Astronaut 2	
2017	The Humanity Bureau	Agent Porter	
2018	Distorted	Phillip Starks	

=== Television ===
Year	Title	Role	Notes
1991	MacGyver	Tookie	Episode: "Gunz 'n Boyz"
1992	L.A. Law	Gilbert Russell	Episode: "Zo Long"
1993	Roc	Young Roc	Episode: "Up in the Attic
1993	Crime & Punishment	Mario Wilson	Episode: "Right to Bear Arms"
1993	Dream On	Manny	Episode: "Oral Sex, Lies and Videotape"
1993	Banner Times	Monty	Television film
1994	M.A.N.T.I.S.	Ski	Television film
1994	Sister, Sister	Anthony	Episode: "The Pimple"
1994	Picket Fences	Black Kid #1	Episode: "Elective Conduct"
1994	M.A.N.T.I.S.	Trey	Episode: "Revelation"
1995	Chicago Hope	Lannie Sutton	Episode: "Great White Hope"
1995	Zooman	Russell	Television film
1995	Beverly Hills, 90210	Juwan	Episode: "Squash It"
1995	Party of Five	Andy Hughes	Episode: "Have No Fear"
1995 & 1997	The Parent 'Hood	Sleep / The Mad Gatter	2 episodes
1996	Moesha	Darnell	Episode: "Pilot"
1996	The Client	Anthony Gibson	Episode: "The High Ground"
1996	L.A. Firefighters	Bobby Grimes	3 episodes
1996	Don't Look Back	Drug Dealer #2	Television film
1996–1997	Dangerous Minds	Cornelius Hawkins	Main role
1997	Touched by an Angel	Jason DeLee	Episode: "At Risk"
1997	NYPD Blue	Jamal	Episode: "A Draining Experience"
1997	Early Edition	Marcus	Episode: "Angels and Devils"
1998	David and Lisa	Tyrone	Television film
1998	Pensacola: Wings of Gold	Chris Johnson	Episode: "Vertigo"
2000	Freedom Song	Owen Walker	Television film
2000	City of Angels	Marvell Preston	Episode: "Deliver the Male"
2000	Judging Amy	Joseph Dutton	Episode: "Gray vs. Gray"
2001	Semper Fi	Keith Maddox	Television film
2001–2002	24	Keith Palmer	Recurring role
2003	Without a Trace	Probationary Fireman	Episode: "Trip Box"
2003–2004	The Guardian	Taliek Allen	4 episodes
2003–2004	JAG	Midshipman Kevin Dupree	3 episodes: "Secret Agent Man", "Pulse Rate" and "One Big Boat"
2004	The Shield	Trick	Episode: "Strays"
2004	Cold Case	Joel	Episode: "The Badlands"
2005	House	Carnell Hall	Episode: "Daddy's Boy"
2006–2007	CSI: Crime Scene Investigation	Aaron James / Marshall James	3 episodes
2009	CSI: Miami	Todd Harris	Episode: "Seeing Red"
2010	Sons of Anarchy	Fester	Episode: "So"
2010	Pleading Guilty	Det. Dewey Phelan	Unaired pilot
2012	The Mentalist	Jeron 'Shade' Slaughter	Episode: "Black Cherry"
2013	Bones	Curtis Martin	Episode: "El Carnicero en el Coche"

== Radio ==
Shannon recorded a public service announcement for Deejay Ra's 'Hip-Hop Literacy' campaign, encouraging the reading of Rubin "Hurricane" Carter's autobiography.
