= Joe E. Martin =

American boxing coach

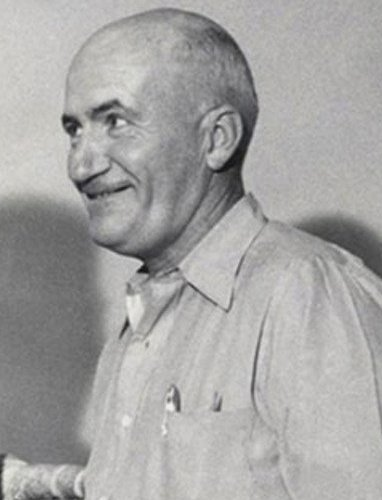
- Martin in 1960
- Born: Joe Elsby Martin; February 1, 1916; Louisville, Kentucky, U.S.
- Died: September 14, 1996 (aged 80); Louisville, Kentucky, U.S.
- Occupations: Boxing coach; Police officer
- Known for: Training Muhammad Ali and Jimmy Ellis
- Police career
- Department: Louisville Police Department
- Service years: 1937–1974
- Rank: Sworn in as an officer (1937)

Joe Elsby Martin Sr. (February 1, 1916 – September 14, 1996) was an American boxing coach who trained two world heavyweight champions, Muhammad Ali and Jimmy Ellis, as well as several national Golden Gloves champions.

== Early life ==
Joe Martin was born February 1, 1916, in Louisville, Kentucky, the son of Joe and Minerva "Sancia" (Shaw) Martin. Both of his parents died before he reached his first birthday, so he was raised by his mother's sister, his Aunt Emma and his uncle Clarence Neal who moved to Pueblo, Colorado and later moved to Alhambra, Phoenix, Arizona. On March 4, 1941, he married Christine Fentress, and they had one child, Joe Jr., who himself became a national Golden Gloves champion.

== Boxing coach and police officer ==
He came to Louisville, Kentucky, in 1937 and joined the Louisville Police Department, serving until his retirement in 1974. In 1938, he became a boxing coach at the Columbia Gym in Louisville (now the student center of Spalding University), where, in 1954, he began coaching Cassius Clay, who later became a three-time world heavyweight champion under the name of Muhammad Ali. Several news stories quote Ali crediting Martin with having shown him how to "float like a butterfly, sting like a bee." While coaching at the Columbia Gym, Martin also trained world heavyweight champion Jimmy Ellis as well as eleven National Golden Gloves champions.

Martin, himself a white man, was an early leader in Louisville's civil rights movement. At the time the future Muhammad Ali began training there, Columbia Gym was racially integrated, unlike other Louisville boxing gyms of that period.

== Muhammad Ali's first coach ==
In 1954, a twelve-year-old then known as Cassius Clay approached Martin to report that his bicycle had been stolen and told Martin that he wanted to "whup" the thief. Martin offered to teach him how to box and guided his career for the next six years. As a 1960 Olympic coach, Martin accompanied the champion to the Olympic Games in Rome, Italy, when Ali won a gold medal. In the 1950s and 1960s, Martin helped produce a weekly television show on WAVE-TV called Tomorrow's Champions, which was broadcast for twelve years. After winning the gold medal, Ali began his professional career but maintained contact with Martin until his death. In the 1970s, Martin appeared on a nationally televised episode of "This Is Your Life," when Ali was the featured guest.

== Retirement and death ==
After retirement, Martin started a business as an auctioneer and twice ran unsuccessfully for Sheriff of Jefferson County, Kentucky. He fell ill in the late summer of 1996 and died in Louisville on September 14, aged 80. He was buried in Memorial Gardens Cemetery in Leitchfield, Kentucky.

== See also ==
- List of people from the Louisville metropolitan area
