= The Hurricane (1999 film) =

1999 film by Norman Jewison

- Theatrical release poster
- Directed by: Norman Jewison
- Screenplay by: Armyan Bernstein; Dan Gordon
- Based on: Lazarus and the Hurricane (1991 book) by: Sam Chaiton; Terry Swinton; The Sixteenth Round (1974 book) by Rubin Carter
- Produced by: Norman Jewison; Armyan Bernstein; John Ketcham
- Starring: Denzel Washington; John Hannah; Deborah Kara Unger; Liev Schreiber; Vicellous Reon Shannon; David Paymer; Dan Hedaya; Harris Yulin; Rod Steiger
- Cinematography: Roger Deakins
- Edited by: Stephen Rivkin
- Music by: Christopher Young
- Production companies: Universal Pictures; Beacon Pictures; Azoff Films
- Distributed by: Universal Pictures
- Release dates: September 17, 1999 (Toronto); December 29, 1999 (U.S.)
- Running time: 146 minutes
- Country: United States
- Language: English
- Budget: $50 million
- Box office: $74 million

The Hurricane is a 1999 American biographical sports drama film directed and produced by Norman Jewison. The film stars Denzel Washington as Rubin "The Hurricane" Carter, a former middleweight boxer who was wrongly convicted of a triple murder in a bar in Paterson, New Jersey. The film depicts Carter's arrest, his life in prison, and how he was freed by the love and compassion of a teenager from Brooklyn named Lesra Martin and his Canadian foster family.

The screenplay was adapted by Armyan Bernstein and Dan Gordon from Carter's 1974 autobiography The Sixteenth Round: From Number 1 Contender To 45472 and the 1991 non-fiction work Lazarus and the Hurricane: The Freeing of Rubin "The Hurricane" Carter by Sam Chaiton and Terry Swinton.

The film was released by Universal Pictures in the United States on December 29, 1999. It received positive reviews from critics and grossed $74 million against a budget of $50 million. For his performance, Washington won the Golden Globe Award for Best Actor and was nominated for the Academy Award and Screen Actors Guild Award in the same category.

== Plot ==
In 1966, Rubin "Hurricane" Carter was a promising and top-ranked middleweight boxer from Paterson, New Jersey, who was expected by many fans to become the world's greatest boxing champion. However, a bartender and two customers were shot to death in a bar, Carter and his friend John Artis, driving home from another club in Paterson, were stopped and interrogated by the police moments after the crime while the police were investigating the killings.

Although the police asserted that Carter and Artis were innocent and thus, "were never suspects," letting them go after questioning them, a man named Alfred Bello, a suspect himself in the killings, who was also questioned by police claimed that Carter and Artis were present at the time of the murders and committed the killings themselves. On the basis of Bello's testimony, Carter and Artis were convicted of the triple homicide in the bar, and Carter was given three consecutive life sentences.

Throughout his time in prison, Carter proclaimed his innocence, claiming that his race was the real reasons for his conviction while he wrote and published his autobiography. Eight years later, Bello and a co-suspect, Arthur Bradley, who also claimed that Carter was present at the scene of the crimes, renounced and recanted their testimony. However, Carter and Artis were convicted once again.

Following the second trial that sent Carter and Artis back to prison, Lesra Martin, an underprivileged Afro-American youth from Brooklyn, went to live in Toronto with a group of Canadian activists who saw his academic potential and offered to raise him as his tutors. In the 1980s, he became interested in Carter's life after purchasing a copy of Carter's autobiography which he read and was convinced of Carter's innocence. Martin and his Canadian foster family committed themselves to Carter's case and joined Carter's legal team to push the State of New Jersey to reexamine Carter's case.

In 1985, a Federal District Court presided over by Judge H. Lee Sarokin of the United States District Court for the District of New Jersey, ruled that the prosecution in Carter's second trial committed "grave constitutional violations" and that his conviction was based on racism rather than facts. As a result, Carter (and later Artis) were finally freed. Both before and after the verdict that set him free, Carter summed up his story by saying, "Hate got me into prison, love got me out."

== Cast ==
- Denzel Washington as Rubin 'The Hurricane' Carter
- Vicellous Reon Shannon as Lesra Martin
- Deborah Kara Unger as Lisa Peters
- Liev Schreiber as Sam Chaiton
- John Hannah as Terry Swinton
- Dan Hedaya as Sergeant Della Pesca (based on Vincent DeSimone)
- Debbi Morgan as Mae Thelma Carter
- Clancy Brown as Lieutenant Jimmy Williams
- David Paymer as Myron Beldock
- Harris Yulin as Leon Friedman
- Rod Steiger as Judge H. Lee Sarokin
- Vincent Pastore as Alfred Bello
- George T. Odom as Ed 'Big Ed'
- Beatrice Winde as Louise Cockersham
- Badja Djola as Mobutu

== Production ==
Norman Jewison became interested in a "Hurricane" Carter biopic in 1992. Armyan Bernstein purchased the filming rights through Beacon Pictures, and went on to write the first scripts while establishing a financing partnership with Irving Azoff. At first, Jewison felt the story was so extensive that it would fit better as a television miniseries.

Once Denzel Washington signed to play the title character, he went through long boxing training, and worked closely with Rubin Carter. Washington said, "He went through pots and pots of coffee and packs of cigarettes. I'd drink a little coffee. It's interesting and challenging when the person is there, alive and in the room."

Filming began in November 1998, with locations in both New Jersey – East Jersey State Prison in Rahway and the cities of Avenel and Paterson – and Toronto.

== Release ==
=== Premiere ===
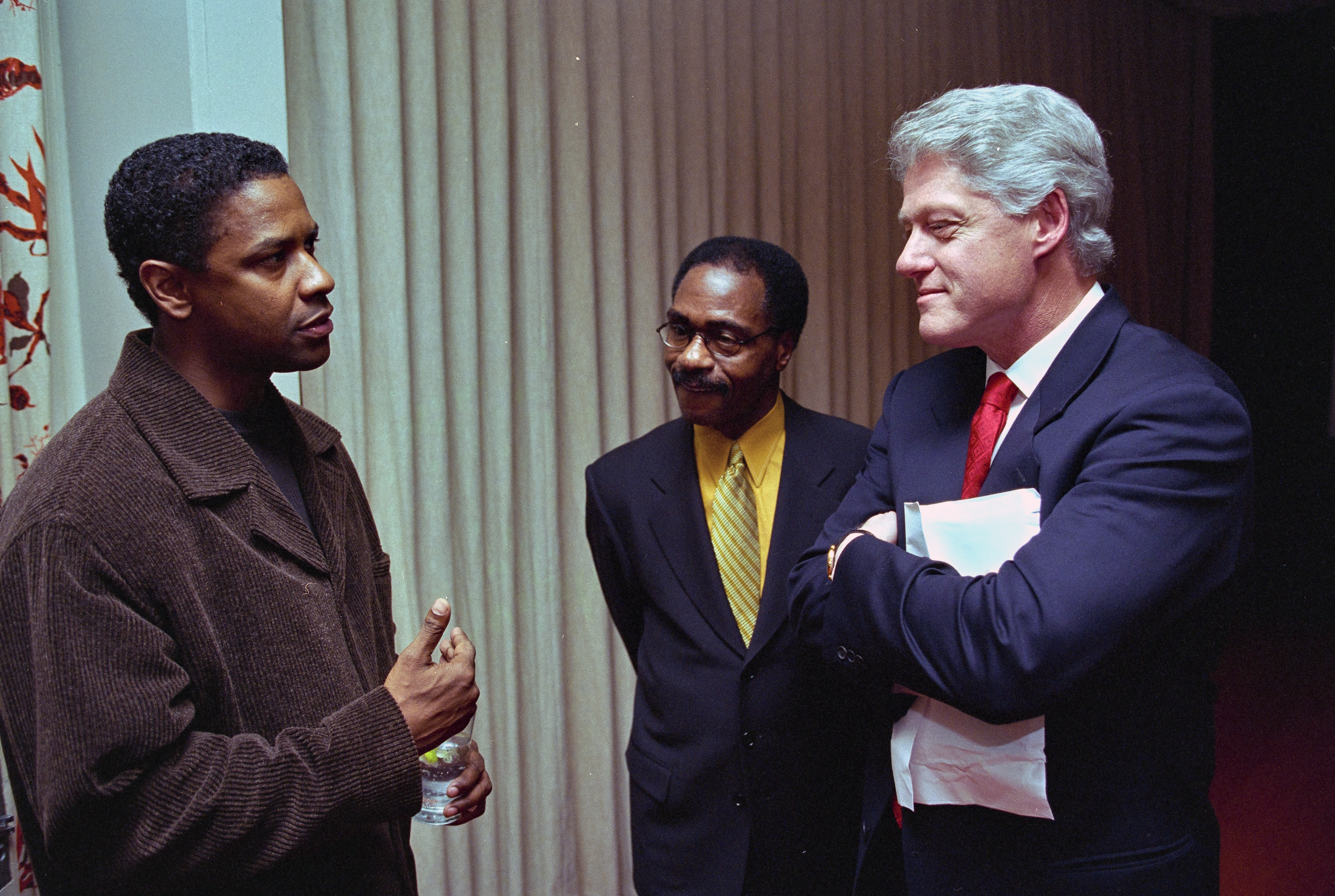
Actor Denzel Washington, Rubin "Hurricane" Carter, and then-president Bill Clinton at The Hurricane screening on December 3, 1999.

The Hurricane premiered on September 17, 1999, at the Toronto International Film Festival. It also was featured at the Berlin International Film Festival on February 17, 2000.

Two weeks prior to its opening in North America, a premiere for The Hurricane was held at the Mann Village Theater in Los Angeles. Many of the depicted people were in attendance. When asked about being portrayed by Denzel Washington, Rubin Carter replied that “I didn’t know I was that good-looking." The film was praised by Lesra Martin, who described it as "a stupendous depiction of accurate events", and John Artis, Carter's friend who was convicted with him, said he “was in awe to see what unfolded and not have to feel the pressure I felt at the time.” An objection was held by H. Lee Sarokin, the federal judge who freed Carter, saying that unlike his portrayal by Rod Steiger “I’m a lower-key guy.”

== Reception ==
=== Box office ===
The film opened in North American limited release on December 29, 1999. The first week's gross was $384,640 (11 screens) and the total receipts for the run were $50,668,906. In its widest release the film was featured in 2,148 theaters. It closed on the week of April 14, 2000. The motion picture was in circulation sixteen weeks.

=== Critical response ===
The Hurricane has an 82% approval rating at Rotten Tomatoes based on 114 reviews. The consensus reads: "Thanks in large part to one of Denzel Washington's most powerful on-screen performances, The Hurricane is a moving, inspirational sports drama, even if it takes few risks in telling its story." Metacritic, which uses a weighted average, assigned the film a score of 74 out of 100, based on 30 critics, indicating "generally favorable" reviews. Audiences polled by CinemaScore gave the film an average grade of "A" on an A+ to F scale.

Roger Ebert, film critic for the Chicago Sun Times, liked the film and the acting, and wrote, "This is one of Denzel Washington's great performances, on a par with his work in Malcolm X.... Washington as Hurricane Carter is spare, focused, filled with anger and pride.... This is strong stuff, and I was amazed, after feeling some impatience in the earlier reaches of the film, to find myself so deeply absorbed in its second and third acts, until at the end I was blinking at tears. What affects me emotionally at the movies is never sadness, but goodness."

Ebert discussed his perspective on the "fictionalized" aspects of the film: "Several people have told me dubiously that they heard the movie was 'fictionalized'. Well, of course it was. Those who seek the truth about a man from the film of his life might as well seek it from his loving grandmother. Most biopics, like most grandmothers, see the good in a man and demonize his enemies. They pass silently over his imprudent romances. In dramatizing his victories, they simplify them. And they provide the best roles to the most interesting characters. If they didn't, we wouldn't pay to see them." He added, "The Hurricane is not a documentary but a parable, in which two lives are saved by the power of the written word."

Film critic Stephen Holden, writing for The New York Times, had mixed views of the film but praised the acting. He wrote: "In telling the story of Mr. Carter's protracted and ultimately successful fight for freedom and justice, The Hurricane rides to glory on an astonishing performance by Denzel Washington.... That is to say, Mr. Washington leans into an otherwise schlocky movie and slams it out of the ballpark. If his Hurricane is an inspiring portrait of nobility, it is because the actor never conceals the demons of fury and despair gnawing beneath his character's forcefully articulate surface."

Alex von Tunzelmann, writing for The Guardian, gave the film a "B", but cited issues with historical accuracy, including depictions of Carter's military service, prior criminal record, and the Giardello fight. She also stated that the inclusion of negative aspects of Carter's life would not have made it acceptable "that he was wrongfully convicted of three murders."

Jewison considered The Hurricane his best work.

=== Accolades ===
==== Wins ====
- Berlin International Film Festival: Prize of the Guild of German rt House Cinemas, Norman Jewison; Silver Berlin Bear, Best Actor, Denzel Washington' 2000.
- Black Reel Awards: Black Reel; Theatrical, Best Actor; Denzel Washington; 2000.
- Golden Globes: Golden Globe; Best Performance by an Actor in a Motion Picture, Drama; Denzel Washington; 2000.
- Image Awards: Image Award; Outstanding Actor in a Motion Picture, Denzel Washington; 2000.

==== Nominations ====
- Academy Awards: Oscar; Best Actor in a Leading Role; Denzel Washington; 2000.
- Screen Actors Guild Awards: Outstanding Performance by a Male Actor in a Leading Role; Denzel Washington; 2000.
- Berlin International Film Festival: Golden Berlin Bear, Norman Jewison; 2000.
- Blockbuster Entertainment Awards: Blockbuster Entertainment Award, Favorite Actor, Drama, Denzel Washington; 2000.
- Chicago Film Critics Association Awards: CFCA Award; Best Actor; Denzel Washington; 2000.
- Golden Globes: Golden Globe; Best Director, Motion Picture, Norman Jewison; Best Motion Picture – Drama; 2000.
- Image Awards: Image Award; Outstanding Actress in a Motion Picture Debbi Morgan, Outstanding Motion Picture; 2000.

== Soundtrack ==
The Hurricane Soundtrack

Soundtrack album by Various Artists
- Released: January 11, 2000
- Recorded: 1999
- Genres: R&B, soul, hip hop, pop rock, jazz
- Label: MCA

Professional ratings
Review scores
| Source | Rating |
|---|---|
| AllMusic | 3/5 stars |
| HipHopPlus | 4.5/5 stars |

| # | Title | Performer(s) | Writer(s) | Length |
|---|---|---|---|---|
| 1 | "Hurricane" | The Roots featuring Black Thought, Common, Mos Def, Dice Raw, Flo Brown and the Jazzyfatnastees | Tariq Trotter, Tracey Moore, Mercedes Martinez, Karl Jenkins, Lonnie "Common" Lynn, Dante "Mos Def" Smith, Falana Brown, Scott Storch | 5:39 |
| 2 | "Little Brother" | Black Star | | 4:01 |
| 3 | "Love Sets You Free" | Kelly Price and Aaron Hall | | 4:06 |
| 4 | "I Don't Know" | The Jazzyfatnastees | | 3:19 |
| 5 | "Isolation" | Meshell Ndegeocello | | 4:57 |
| 6 | "The Revolution Will Not Be Televised" | Gil Scott-Heron | Heron | 3:05 |
| 7 | "One More Mountain (Free Again)" | K-Ci & JoJo | Diane Warren | 3:41 |
| 8 | "Hurricane" | Bob Dylan | Dylan, Jacques Levy | 8:33 |
| 9 | "Hard Times (No One Knows Better Than I)" | Ray Charles | Charles | 2:55 |
| 10 | "In The Basement part 1" | Etta James | Billy Davis, Raynard Miner, Carl Smith | 2:22 |
| 11 | "Still I Rise" | Melky Sedeck | | 4:15 |
| 12 | "I Don't Know" | Ruth Brown | Brook Benton, Bobby Stevenson | 2:53 |
| 13 | "So Amazing" | Clark Anderson | C. Anderson, Summer Anderson | 4:32 |
| 14 | "The Suite" | Christopher Young | Young | 7:18 |

== Lawsuit ==
Former middleweight World Champion Joey Giardello sued the film's producers for libel over the depiction of his fight with Carter as a "racist fix." Giardello stated: "Virtually every boxing expert then and now will tell you I won the fight." Referee Robert Polis who scored the fight 72–66 in Giardello's favor stated: "They portrayed Joey Giardello as an incompetent fighter. I thought it was ludicrous.".

Eventually, the case was settled out of court, with the producers paying the retired champion damages and with Jewison agreeing to make a statement on the DVD version that "Giardello no doubt was a great fighter."

== See also ==
- Denzel Washington filmography
- List of boxing films
