= Tomorrow's Champions =

Defunct American boxing program

Tomorrow's Champions is a local television program in Louisville, Kentucky, which featured bouts between local amateur boxers. It aired on NBC affiliate WAVE from 1954 to 1966. It was produced by Louisville police officer and boxing trainer Joe Martin. Future World Heavyweight Champions Muhammad Ali and Jimmy Ellis got their starts boxing on the program.

== Sources ==
- Withers, David F. (2001). "Boxing". In Kleber, John E. (ed.). The Encyclopedia of Louisville. Lexington, Kentucky: University Press of Kentucky. p. 109. ISBN 0-8131-2100-0. OCLC 247857447.
