= Washington Crossing National Cemetery =

Veterans cemetery in Bucks County, Pennsylvania

Coordinates: 40°16′15″N 74°54′04″W

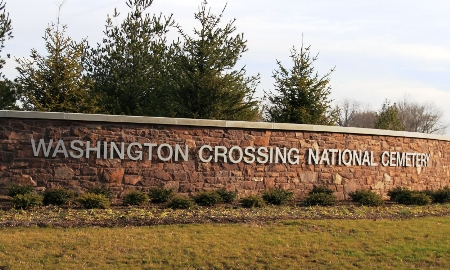
Front entrance

Washington Crossing National Cemetery is a United States National Cemetery located in Upper Makefield Township, in Bucks County, Pennsylvania. It opened in late 2009 and occupies approximately 205 acres (83 ha). Administered by the United States Department of Veterans Affairs, the cemetery serves veterans in the greater Philadelphia metropolitan area. Its name is due to its location less than 3 miles (4.8 km) from Washington's Crossing, the site of George Washington's Christmas 1776 crossing of the Delaware River just before the Battle of Trenton during the American Revolutionary War.

Bucks County Congressman Michael Fitzpatrick has been credited with securing federal funding for the cemetery after decades of congressional inaction.

== Notable burials ==
- George Benton (1933–2011), former US Army soldier and professional boxer
- Michael G. Fitzpatrick (1963–2020), US Representative
- Tom Gola (1933–2014), former US Army soldier and professional basketball player
- Harold Johnson (1928–2015), Hall of Fame professional boxer
- Mildred Dalton Manning (1914–2013), Army Nurse Corps lieutenant, Bronze Star recipient, and the last survivor of the "Angels of Bataan and Corregidor"
- Sara Seegar (1914–1990), actress

== See also ==
- List of Pennsylvania cemeteries
