= Cassius Clay vs. Duke Sabedong =

1961 boxing match

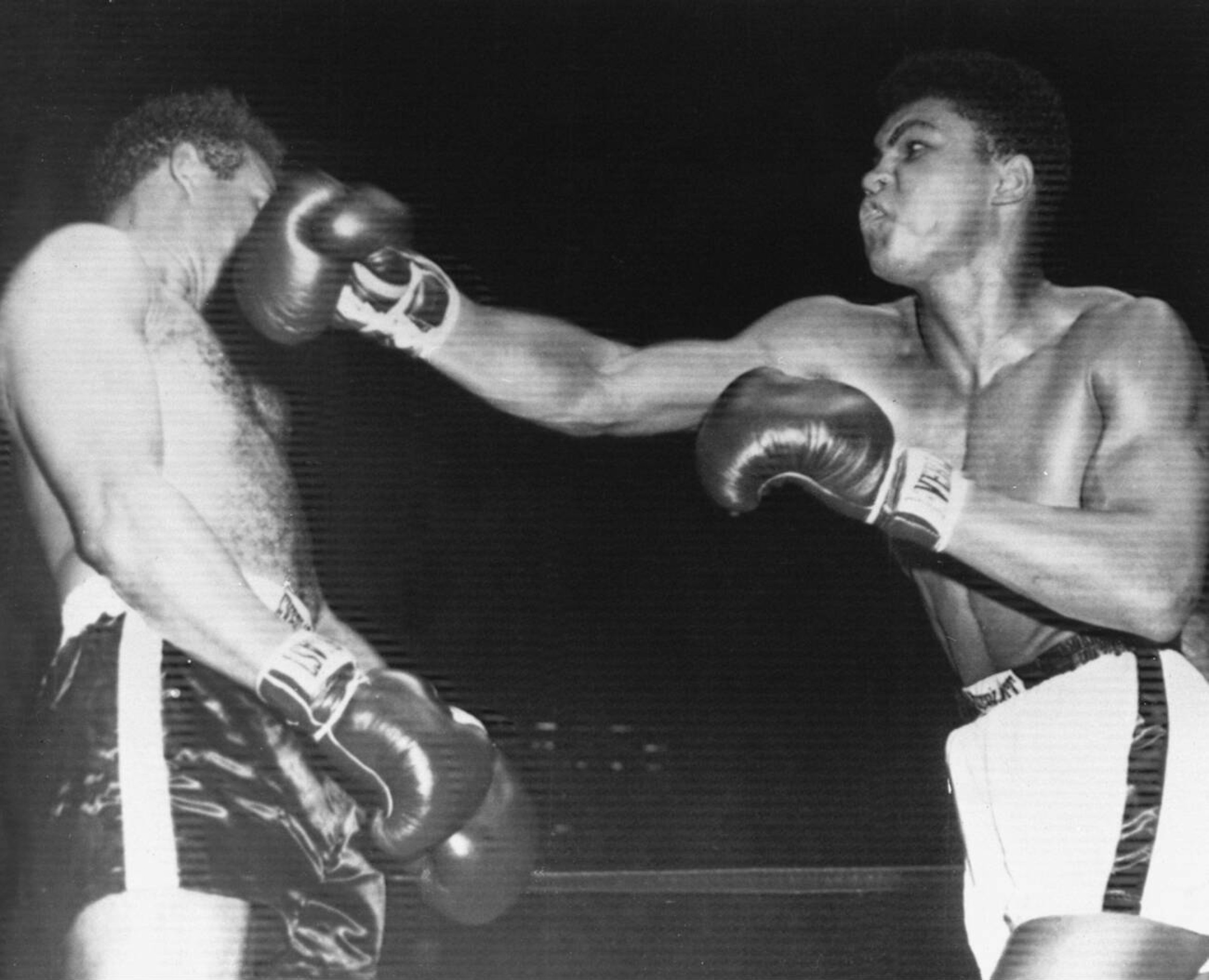
- Date: June 26, 1961
- Venue: Las Vegas Convention Center, Las Vegas, Nevada

Tale of the tape
Boxer	(United States) Cassius Clay	(United States) Duke Sabedong
Nickname	"The Louisville Lip"	"Kolo"
Hometown	Louisville, Kentucky	Hilo, Hawaii
Pre-fight record	6–0 (5 KO)	15–11–1 (10 KO)
Age	19 years, 5 months	30 years, 11 months
Height	6 ft 3 in (191 cm)	6 ft 6 in (198 cm)
Weight	194 lb (88 kg)	225 lb (102 kg)
Style	Orthodox	Orthodox
Recognition	1960 Olympic light heavyweight Gold Medallist	

Result
- Clay won in 10 rounds by unanimous decision

Cassius Clay vs. Duke Sabedong was a professional boxing match contested on June 26, 1961.

== Background ==
Clay along with matchmaker Mel "Red" Greb, gave a local radio interview in hopes of drumming up interest for his Las Vegas debut.

== The fight ==
The fight went the full distance with Clay winning comfortably on points, despite Sabedong's usage of roughhouse tactics. (Note: Sabedong was penalized twice and warned thrice during this fight for using tactics like throwing low blows and hitting after the break.)

== Aftermath ==
The fight's special significance rests on Clay's interactions with Gorgeous George during the pre-match promotional activities related to the Clay-Sabedong bout, and also just after the fight. These interactions would shape Clay's behavior and mannerisms, particularly while promoting his future fights, for the rest of his boxing career.

== Undercard ==
Confirmed bouts:

== Notes ==
Preceded by vs. Lamar Clark	Cassius Clay's bouts 26 June 1961	Succeeded by vs. Alonzo Johnson
Preceded by vs. Alejandro Lavorante	Duke Sabedong's bouts 26 June 1961	Succeeded by vs. Freeman Hardin
