= Beckley-Raleigh County Convention Center =

Convention center in Beckley, West Virginia

Coordinates: 37°46′45.8″N 81°9′47.7″W

- Interactive map of Beckley-Raleigh County Convention Center
- Former names: Raleigh County Armory
- Address: 200 Armory Drive; Beckley, West Virginia; United States
- Owner: Raleigh County Commission
- Capacity: 2,856

Construction
- Opened: 1961

Tenants
- WVU Tech Golden Bears basketball (NAIA)

The Beckley-Raleigh County Convention Center (originally the Raleigh County Armory) is a 2,856-seat indoor arena and convention center located in Beckley, West Virginia. It is used for basketball and is home to the West Virginia University Institute of Technology and Woodrow Wilson High School basketball teams. It was built in 1961.

The arena, identifiable on the outside by its domed roof, contains 15,000 square feet (1,400 m^{2}) of exhibit and meeting space. Adjacent to the arena are eight meeting rooms with an additional 10,240 square feet (951 m^{2}) of meeting space. In addition to sporting events and conventions, the arena also hosts concerts, banquets and other special events.
