= Cassius Clay vs. Alex Miteff =

1961 boxing match

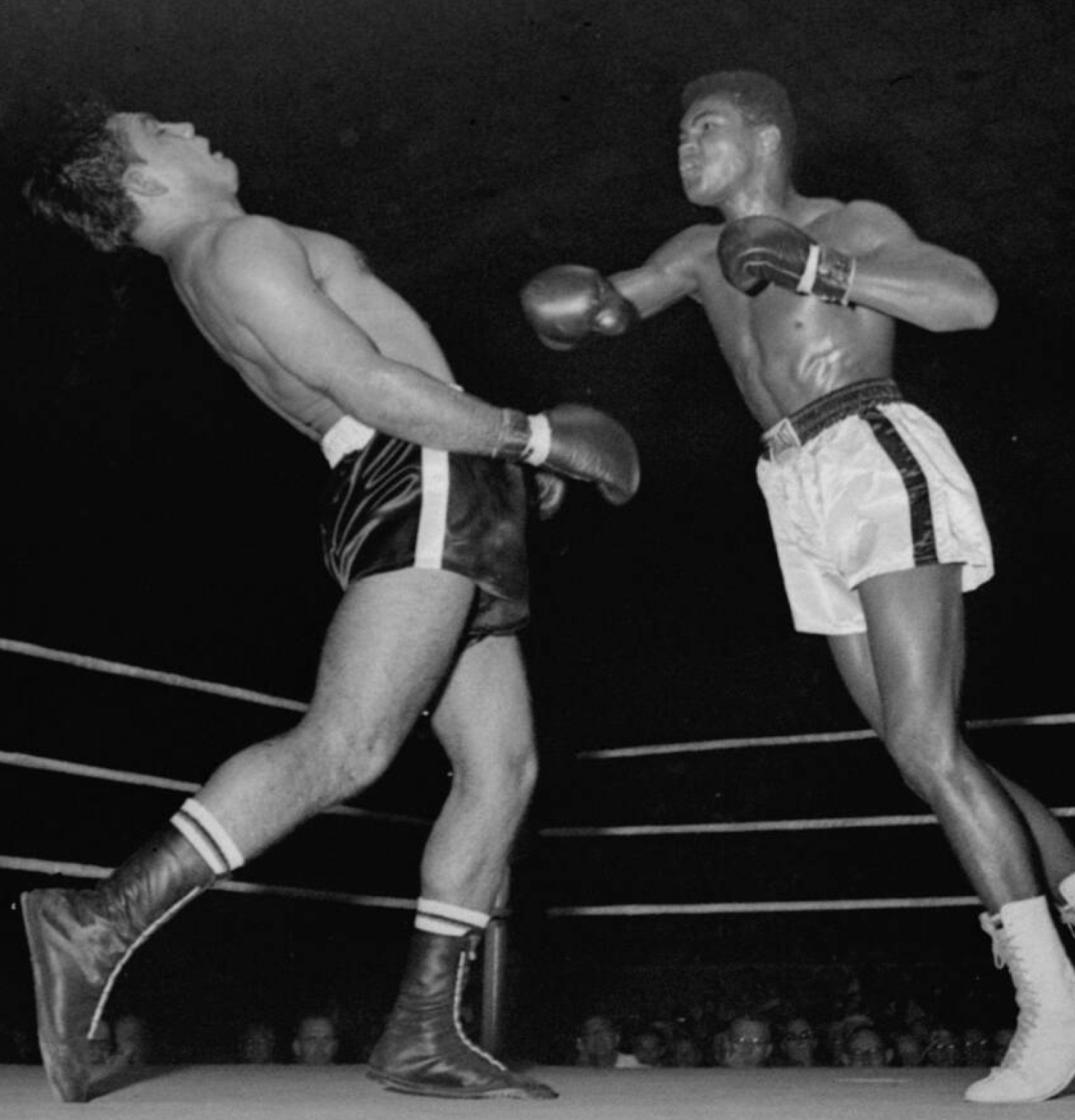
- Date: October 7, 1961
- Venue: Freedom Hall, Louisville, Kentucky

Tale of the tape
| Boxer | (United States) Cassius Clay | (Argentina) Alex Miteff |
| Nickname | "The Louisville Lip" | |
| Hometown | Louisville, Kentucky, U.S. | María Teresa, Santa Fe de la Vera Cruz, Argentina |
| Pre-fight record | 8–0 (5 KO) | 24–10–1 (14 KO) |
| Age | 19 years, 8 months | 26 years, 6 months |
| Height | 6 ft 3 in (191 cm) | 6 ft 1 in (185 cm) |
| Weight | 188 lb (85 kg) | 210 lb (95 kg) |
| Style | Orthodox | Orthodox |
| Recognition | 1960 Olympic light heavyweight Gold Medallist | |

Result
- Clay won by TKO in 6st round (1:45)

Cassius Clay vs. Alex Miteff was a professional boxing match contested on October 7, 1961. Clay won the fight through a technical knockout when the referee stopped the fight in the sixth round. Miteff and Clay would feature in the 1962 film Requiem for a Heavyweight.

== Background ==
Miteff had won the gold medal for the heavyweight championship at the 1955 Pan American Games. He had fought twice with George Chuvalo in boxing matches, in June 1958 and March 1961, drawing the first bout and losing on a split decision in the second. Miteff had also defeated Clay's previous opponent Alonzo Johnson. At the time of the Clay-Miteff bout, Miteff had a record of twenty four wins and ten losses.

=== Buildup ===
At the time of the Clay-Miteff bout, Clay was 19 years old and weighed 188 pounds; Miteff was 27 or 28 and weighed 210 pounds. However, at 6 feet three inches, Clay was two inches taller than Miteff. Miteff had competed against some of the top level boxers at the time. He was tough and had the reputation of being a strong puncher. It was held that the Clay-Miteff match would provide Clay's toughest test to date. Before the fight, Clay had informed reporters:

My plan for fighting Alex Miteff is two fast left jabs, a rapid right, and a left hook. And if he's still standing and the referee isn't holding him up, then I'm gonna run."

However, Clay also made a prediction before this fight: "He'll go in six [rounds]."

=== Gloves ===
Just before the match, it was realized that boxing gloves had not been arranged for the bout. At short notice, two pairs of boxing gloves were procured but they were "half horsehair and half foam rubber" as contrasted with regular boxing gloves which are made only of horsehair. The procured gloves were "hard as a rock"; it was believed that the usage of these gloves would favor Miteff since he was regarded a better puncher than Clay.

== The fight ==
=== Round 1 ===
In the first round, Clay sprung a surprise by trying for a swift knockout using multiple combinations. However, Miteff was able to withstand Clay's punches while also throwing infrequent hooks to Clay's body.

=== Round 2 ===
Clay continued throwing punches at Miteff until he was hit on the jaw by a powerful right by Miteff. This slowed Clay down for the rest of this round which Miteff won. While providing anxious moments to Clay supporters, Clay's recovery from Miteff's punch dispelled doubts about Clay's ability to withstand punishment in the ring.

=== Rounds 3-5 ===
Rounds three through five featured a similar pattern of Miteff throwing hooks to Clay's body, and Clay throwing combinations at Miteff's face. During these rounds, Miteff would occasionally make strange faces, or let his hands drop, and challenge Clay to punch him.

=== Round 6 ===
It was still a close fight till the middle of round 6 when Clay hit Miteff with a tentative left jab followed by a right on the chin which knocked down Miteff. Miteff got up and moved towards a corner "in the determined important walk of a drunk" following which the referee stopped the fight.

Miteff had never been knocked out before. And in the dressing room afterward, he kept asking what happened. He couldn't believe that Cassius Clay had knocked him out.

== Aftermath ==
After the match, Clay commented that the right which had knocked out Miteff was the hardest punch he had thrown in the ring to date. Angelo Dundee noted the technical improvements in Clay's boxing that were observed in this fight:

You see the way he was tying up Miteff's left. He could never do that before. Now I'll teach him how to tie up the right. And he's starting to stick with authority. His jab's not a flick any more. It's a weapon.

Clay's next boxing match, also held in Louisville, would be with Willi Besmanoff. Miteff would only fight three more boxing matches in his fight career—in November 1961, August 1966, and April 1967; he would win the 1966 bout and lose the other two matches. For many years Miteff worked as the chauffeur of David Susskind; he also worked as a hotel greeter.

=== Requiem for a Heavyweight ===
Both Clay and Miteff featured in the 1962 film Requiem for a Heavyweight in which the protagonist Mountain Rivera, a boxer long past his prime, gets badly beaten in his final bout by a younger opponent. The character of Mountain Rivera was played by Anthony Quinn, and the part of the younger boxer by Clay. Miteff, whose own boxing career had disintegrated by this time, played Quinn's double in the film. It has been suggested that the boxing careers of Mountain Rivera and Miteff have conspicuous parallels.

Clay's performance in the fight scene of the film was later described as "explosive". Stephen Battaglio, in his biography of David Susskind, observes:

It was a stunning early glimpse of Ali, an image that everyone in the country would soon recognize when he became the most dynamic and polarizing sports figure of the decade. Off camera, Ali charmed the cast and crew so much that they passed a hat around the ringside set on Randall's Island Arena to take up a collection to supplement the modest fee he was paid.

== Undercard ==
Confirmed bouts:

== Broadcasting ==
| Country | Broadcaster |
|---|---|
| United Kingdom | BBC |
| United States | ABC |

| Preceded by vs. Alonzo Johnson | Cassius Clay's bouts 7 October 1961 | Succeeded by vs. Willi Besmanoff |
| Preceded by vs. Jimmy McCarter | Alex Miteff's bouts 7 October 1961 | Succeeded by vs. Ray Batey |
