= Murder of Nathan Blenner =

1985 murder in Queens, New York

Nathan Blenner
- Born: 1965; Queens, New York, U.S.
- Died: 1985 (aged 19–20); Queens, New York, U.S.
- Cause of death: Ballistic trauma
- Known for: Victim of unsolved murder

Nathan Blenner (1965–1985) was a 20-year-old man from Queens, New York who was kidnapped in 1985 outside his home. His body was found with a single fatal bullet wound in his head. Willie Stuckey and David McCallum, both 16 at the time, were arrested and allegedly confessed to killing Blenner during an attempted car theft and later alleged to having a joyride in the victim's car.

Despite recanting their confessions soon after, both suspects were found guilty and sentenced to 25 years to life imprisonment based on false confessions. Both suspects were exonerated in 2014. McCallum was exonerated and released after serving 29 years of his sentence. Stuckey was posthumously exonerated. He died in prison in 2001 having served 16 years behind bars. A campaign for the exoneration of the two came after a lengthy and publicized campaign for McCallum's release.

== Documentary David and Me ==
A documentary titled David & Me, by the Toronto-based documentary filmmakers Ray Klonsky and co-director Marc Lamy of Markham Street Films, was made to show the inconsistencies of the case and a campaign for release of McCallum, after meeting him and fighting for a decade for his release. Their film had its world premiere at the 2014 Hot Docs Canadian International Documentary Festival in Toronto.

== Rubin Carter campaign ==
It also included a famous op-ed in the New York Daily News by former boxer and wrongful convictions advocate Rubin "Hurricane" Carter, who penned a plea from his death bed to District Attorney Kenneth P. Thompson to release what he said was the wrongly convicted McCallum. "My single regret in life is that David McCallum (...) is still in prison", Carter wrote in February 2014, two months before he died, calling for Brooklyn District Attorney Kenneth Thompson to review the case. "Knowing what I do, I am certain that when the facts are brought to light, Thompson will recommend his immediate release", Carter wrote.

== Exoneration ==
After being imprisoned for 29 years, a new legal process was opened on the case and David McCallum, now 45, and William Stuckey, already deceased, were both found innocent of the murder. District Attorney Ken Thompson's office and the Conviction Review Unit completed their reviews of McCallum's case and agreed to set him free. "We have determined that there's not a single piece of evidence that linked David McCallum or William Stuckey to the abduction of Nathan Blenner or his death — "except for their brief confessions, which prosecutors have now concluded were false".

Thompson stated that he had "inherited a legacy of disgrace" when he took office in January 2014 and had to act swiftly for justice. Brooklyn Supreme Court Justice Matthew D'Emic dismissed the conviction at the request of DA Thompson. The judge also threw out the conviction of Willie Stuckey, finding they were "both pressured into confessing as teenagers". Thompson's predecessor had reviewed the convictions in 2013 and decided to stand by them. Upon the hearing, McCallum was released on October 15, 2014. Stuckey died in 2001 in prison of a heart attack after spending 16 years behind bars.

== See also ==
- List of kidnappings
- List of unsolved murders (1980–1999)
- List of wrongful convictions in the United States
