= Cassius Clay vs. Alonzo Johnson =

1961 boxing match

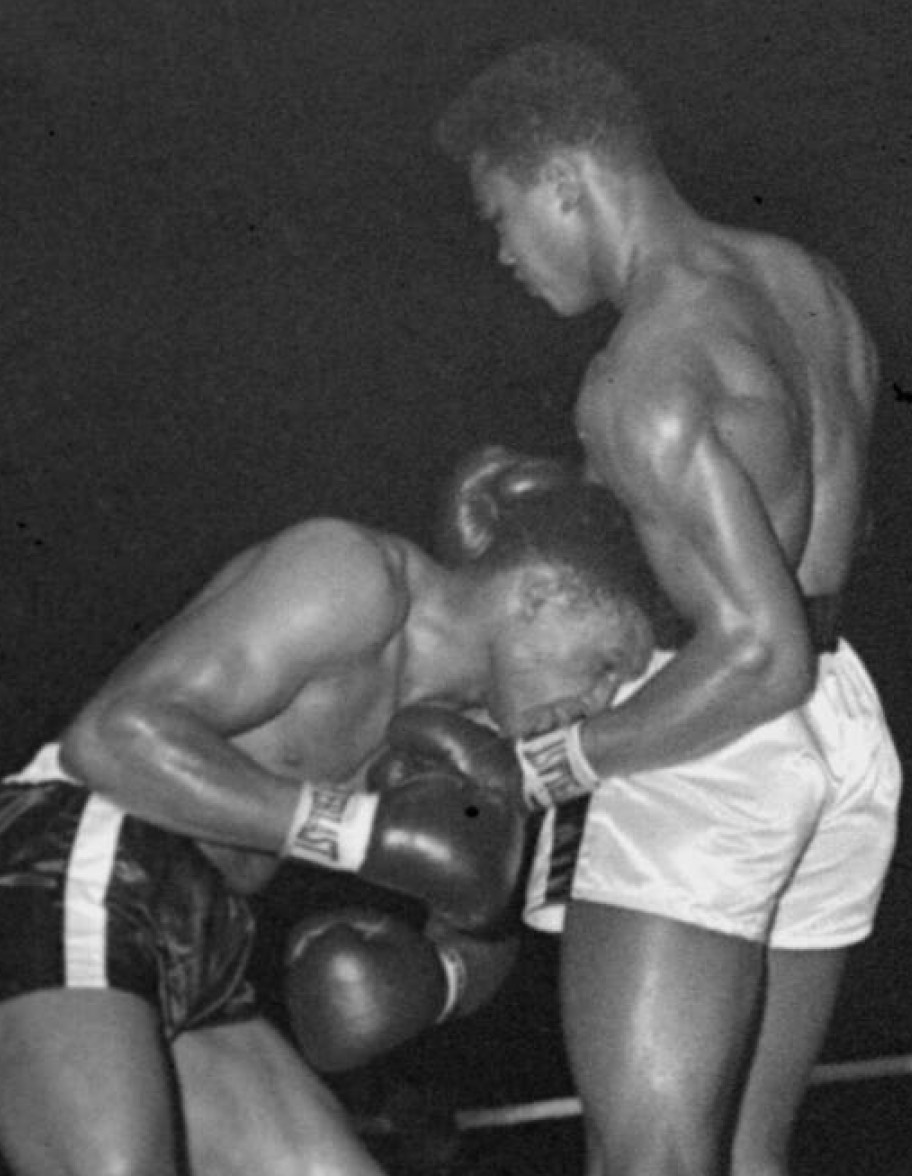
- Date: July 22, 1961
- Venue: Freedom Hall, Louisville, Kentucky

Tale of the tape
Boxer	(United States) Cassius Clay	(United States) Alonzo Johnson
Nickname	"The Louisville Lip"	
Hometown	Louisville, Kentucky	Aberdeen, Mississippi
Pre-fight record	7–0 (5 KO)	18–7 (6 KO)
Age	19 years, 6 months	26 years, 8 months
Height	6 ft 3 in (191 cm)	5 ft 11 1/2 in (182 cm)
Weight	192 1/2 lb (87 kg)	189 lb (86 kg)
Style	Orthodox	Orthodox
Recognition	1960 Olympic light heavyweight Gold Medallist	

Result
- Clay won in 10 rounds by unanimous decision

Cassius Clay vs. Alonzo Johnson was a professional boxing match contested on July 22, 1961.

== Background ==
Ahead of the bout Johnson's manager expressed confidence saying "Clay is a little too young to be meeting the top-flight heavies".

== The fight ==
Cassius Clay won the bout on points with a unanimous decision.

== Aftermath ==
Johnson would later serve as a sparing partner for Henry Cooper ahead of his first match with Clay in 1963.

== Undercard ==
Confirmed bouts:

== Broadcasting ==
Country	Broadcaster
United States	ABC

Preceded by vs. Duke Sabedong	Cassius Clay's bouts 22 July 1961	Succeeded by vs. Alex Miteff
Preceded by vs. Alex Miteff	Alonzo Johnson's bouts 22 July 1961	Succeeded by vs. Alejandro Lavorante
