= Holley Mims =

American boxer

Personal information
- Nationality: American
- Born: February 10, 1929 Washington, D.C., United States
- Died: January 13, 1970 (aged 40) Washington, D.C., United States
- Height: 5 ft 7 in (1.70 m)

Boxing career
- Stance: Orthodox

Holley Mims (February 10, 1929 – January 13, 1970) was a highly regarded middleweight boxer during the 1950s and 1960s. His overall record 64-27-6 (13 KOs) meant that he spent much of his career ranked among the top ten boxers in the middleweight category. Among his notable fights was a loss to Rubin Carter in 1962, a fight that he took on one day's notice, having flown into New York City just prior the fight; Mims dropped Carter in round four. Because of the loss, Mims dropped out of The Ring's list of the top-ten middleweights contenders. Holley fought Sugar Ray Robinson and lost. Some say Robinson only won by decision and that Mims was the real winner. Mims was known for fast hands and quick punches. They fought at what was Turner's Area on 14th and W sts NW DC. Mims fought with a team that met around age 16 or 17 at the YMCA 12st between S and T Sts NW. Their team, Mims, Garland Edwards (whom Mims fought twice and won, once by split decision), Rocky Farrell, Arthur Bethea, Sam Jefferson. and many other notable boxers and athletes (Walter 'Tommy' Thompson, weightlifter) over the years, trained at Finleys Gym owned by Jim Finley, well known and loved in DC. Mims died of a kidney ailment at the age of 40. He was survived by a wife and two children.
