= Rubin Carter =

American boxer (1937–2014)

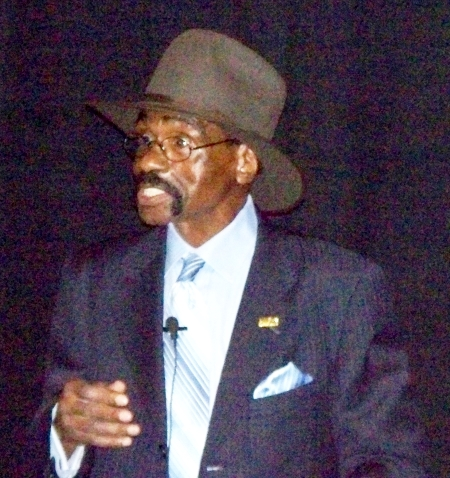
- Carter in 2011
- Born: May 6, 1937; Clifton, New Jersey, U.S.
- Died: April 20, 2014 (aged 76); Toronto, Ontario, Canada
- Citizenship: United States; Canada
- Spouse: Mae Thelma Basket; Lisa Peters
- Children: 2
- Boxing career
- Nickname: The Hurricane
- Height: 5 ft 8 in (1.73 m)
- Weight: Middleweight
- Reach: 72 in (183 cm)
- Stance: Orthodox

Boxing record
- Total fights: 40
- Wins: 27
- Win by KO: 19
- Losses: 12
- Draws: 1

Signature
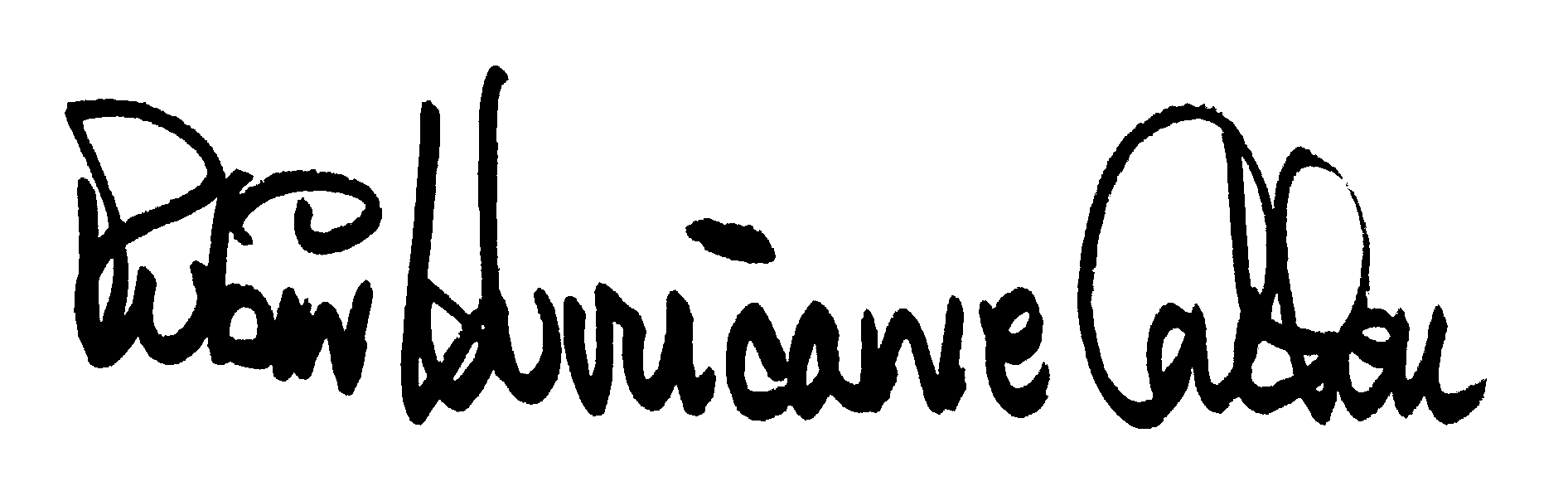

Rubin "Hurricane" Carter (May 6, 1937 – April 20, 2014) was an American middleweight boxer who was wrongfully convicted and imprisoned for murder, until released following a petition of habeas corpus after spending 18 years and 4 months in prison.

In 1966, Carter and his co-accused, John Artis, were arrested for a triple homicide which was committed at the Lafayette Bar and Grill in Paterson, New Jersey, United States. Shortly after the killings at 2:30 a.m., a car, carrying Carter, Artis, and a third man, was stopped by police outside the bar as they were on their way home from a nearby nightclub. They were allowed to go on their way but, after dropping off the third man, Carter and Artis were stopped and arrested while they were passing the bar a second time 45 minutes later. In 1967, they were convicted of all three murders and given life sentences. Their sentences were overturned in 1985 on the basis of prosecutor misconduct and dubious eyewitness testimony. Prosecutors appealed to the U.S. Supreme Court, but declined to retry the case after the appeal failed.

Carter's autobiography, titled The Sixteenth Round, written while he was in prison, was published in 1974 by Viking Press. The story inspired the 1975 Bob Dylan song "Hurricane" and the 1999 film The Hurricane, starring Denzel Washington as Carter. From 1993 to 2005, Carter served as executive director of the Association in Defence of the Wrongly Convicted, later renamed Innocence Canada.

In 2019, the case was the focus of a 13-part BBC podcast series, The Hurricane Tapes. The series was based on interviews which were conducted with survivors, case notes which were taken during the original investigations and 40 hours of recorded interviews of Carter by the author Ken Klonsky, who cited them in his 2011 book The Eye of the Hurricane.

== Early life ==
Carter was born in Clifton, New Jersey, in 1937, the fourth of seven children. He later admitted to a troubled relationship with his father, a strict disciplinarian. At the age of eleven, he was sentenced to a juvenile reformatory for assault, having stabbed a man who allegedly had tried to sexually assault him. In 1954, the reformatory released 17-year-old Carter who enlisted in the U.S. Army. A few months after completing basic training at Fort Jackson, South Carolina, he was sent to West Germany. While in West Germany, Carter began to box for the Army. He was discharged in 1956 as unfit for service, after four courts-martial. Shortly after his discharge, he returned home to New Jersey, was convicted of two muggings and sent to prison.

== Boxing career ==
After his release from prison in September 1961, Carter became a professional boxer. At 5 ft 8 in (1.73 m), Carter was shorter than the average middleweight, but he fought all of his professional career at 155–160 lb (70–72.6 kg). His aggressive style and punching power (resulting in many early-round knockouts) drew attention, establishing him as a crowd favorite and earning him the nickname "Hurricane". After he defeated a number of middleweight contenders—such as Florentino Fernandez, Holley Mims, Gomeo Brennan and George Benton—the boxing world took notice. The Ring first listed him as one of its Top 10 middleweight contenders in July 1963. At the end of 1965, they ranked him as the number five middleweight.

He fought six times in 1963, winning four bouts and losing two. He remained ranked in the lower part of the top 10 until December 20, when he surprised the boxing world by flooring past and future world champion Emile Griffith twice in the first round and scoring a technical knockout. That win resulted in The Ring's ranking of Carter as the number three contender for Joey Giardello's world middleweight title. Carter won two more fights (one a decision over future heavyweight champion Jimmy Ellis) in 1964, before meeting Giardello in Philadelphia for a 15-round championship match on December 14. Carter landed a few solid rights to the head in the fourth round that left Giardello staggering but was unable to follow them up, and Giardello took control of the fight in the fifth round. The judges decided unanimously in favor of Giardello.

After that fight, Carter's ranking in The Ring began to decline. He fought nine times in 1965, winning five but losing three of four against contenders Luis Manuel Rodríguez, Dick Tiger, and Harry Scott. Tiger, in particular, floored Carter three times in their match. "It was", Carter said, "the worst beating that I took in my life—inside or outside the ring". During his visit to London to fight Scott, Carter was involved in an incident in which a shot was fired in his hotel room.

Carter's last fight was on August 5, 1966, against Juan Carlos Rivero. He lost the fight via points decision. Carter's career ended short with a record of 27 wins with 19 total knockouts (8 KOs and 11 TKOs), 12 losses and one draw in 40 fights. He received an honorary championship title belt from the World Boxing Council in 1993 (as did Joey Giardello at the same banquet) and was later inducted into the New Jersey Boxing Hall of Fame.

== Arrest and conviction ==
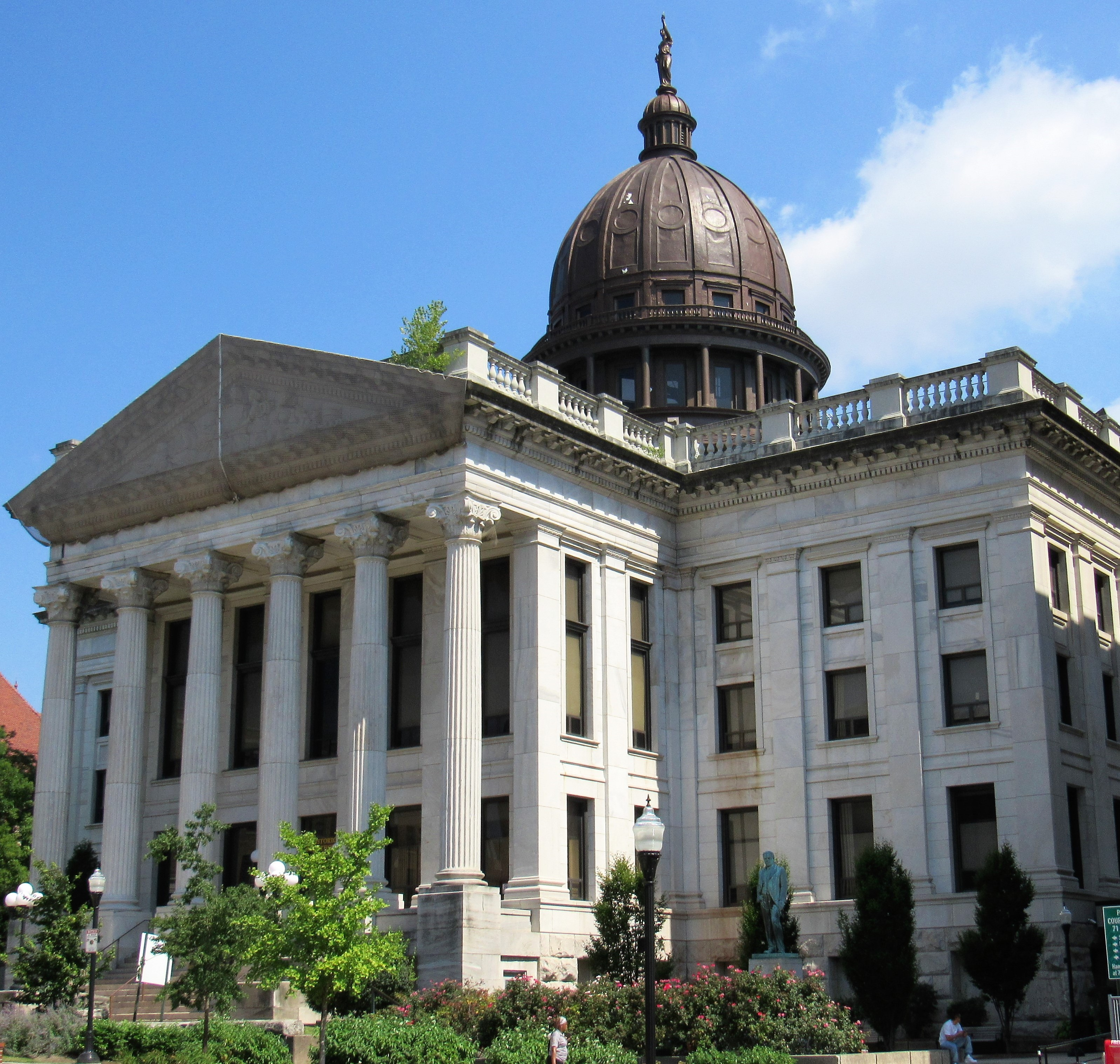
Paterson Court House

At approximately 2:30 a.m. on June 17, 1966, two men entered the Lafayette Bar and Grill in Paterson, New Jersey and began shooting. The bartender, James Oliver, and a customer, Fred Nauyoks, were killed immediately. Hazel Tanis died in a hospital a month later, having suffered multiple wounds from shotgun pellets; a third customer, Willie Marins, survived the attack, despite a head wound that blinded him in one eye. When questioned, both told police the shooters had been black males, but neither identified Carter or John Artis.

Ten minutes after the murders, around 2:40 a.m., a police cruiser stopped Carter and Artis in a rental car, returning from a night out at the Nite Spot, a nearby bar. Carter was in the back, with Artis driving and a third man, John Royster, in the passenger seat. The police recognised Carter, a well-known and controversial local figure, but let him go. Minutes later, the same officers solicited a description of the getaway car from two eyewitnesses outside the bar, Patricia "Patty" Valentine and Alfred Bello.

Bello later admitted he was in the area acting as a lookout while an accomplice, Arthur Bradley, broke into a nearby warehouse. At the time, he claimed to have discovered the bodies when he entered the bar to buy cigarettes; it also transpired that he took the opportunity to empty the cash register and encountered the police as he exited. At the trial, he testified he was approaching the Lafayette when two black males, one with a shotgun, the other a pistol, came around the corner. He ran from them and they got into a white car that was double-parked near the Lafayette.

Valentine lived above the bar and heard the shots. Like Bello, she reported seeing two black men leave the bar, then get into a white car. They reportedly described it as white, with "a geometric design, sort of a butterfly type design in the back of the car" and New York state license plates, with blue background and orange lettering. Another neighbor, Ronald Ruggiero, also heard the shots and said that, from his window, he saw Alfred Bello running west on Lafayette Street toward 16th Street. He then heard the screech of tires and saw a white car shoot past, heading west, with two black males in the front seat.

Valentine initially stated the car had rear lights which lit up completely like butterflies. At the retrial in 1976, she changed this to an accurate description of Carter's car, which had conventional tail-lights with aluminum decoration in a butterfly shape. This aligned with that provided by Bello; the prosecution later suggested the confusion was the result of a misreading of a court transcript by the defense.

Having dropped off Royster, Carter was now being driven home by Artis; they were stopped again at 3:00 a.m. and ordered to follow the police to the station, where they were arrested. However, variances in descriptions given by Valentine and Bello, the physical characteristics of the attackers provided by the two survivors, lack of forensic evidence, and the timeline provided by the police were key factors in the conviction being overturned in 1985.

Forensics later established the victims were shot by a .32-caliber pistol and a 12-gauge shotgun, although the weapons were never found. There was no forensic evidence linking Carter or Artis to the murders. While gun residue tests were commonly used, DeSimone, the lead detective, later claimed he had insufficient time to bring in an expert to administer the tests. He did arrange for an expert to conduct lie detector tests, which they passed. In 1976, a second report was discovered, claiming they failed. After 17 hours of interrogation, they were released. Carter and Artis voluntarily appeared before a grand jury, which found there was no case to answer.

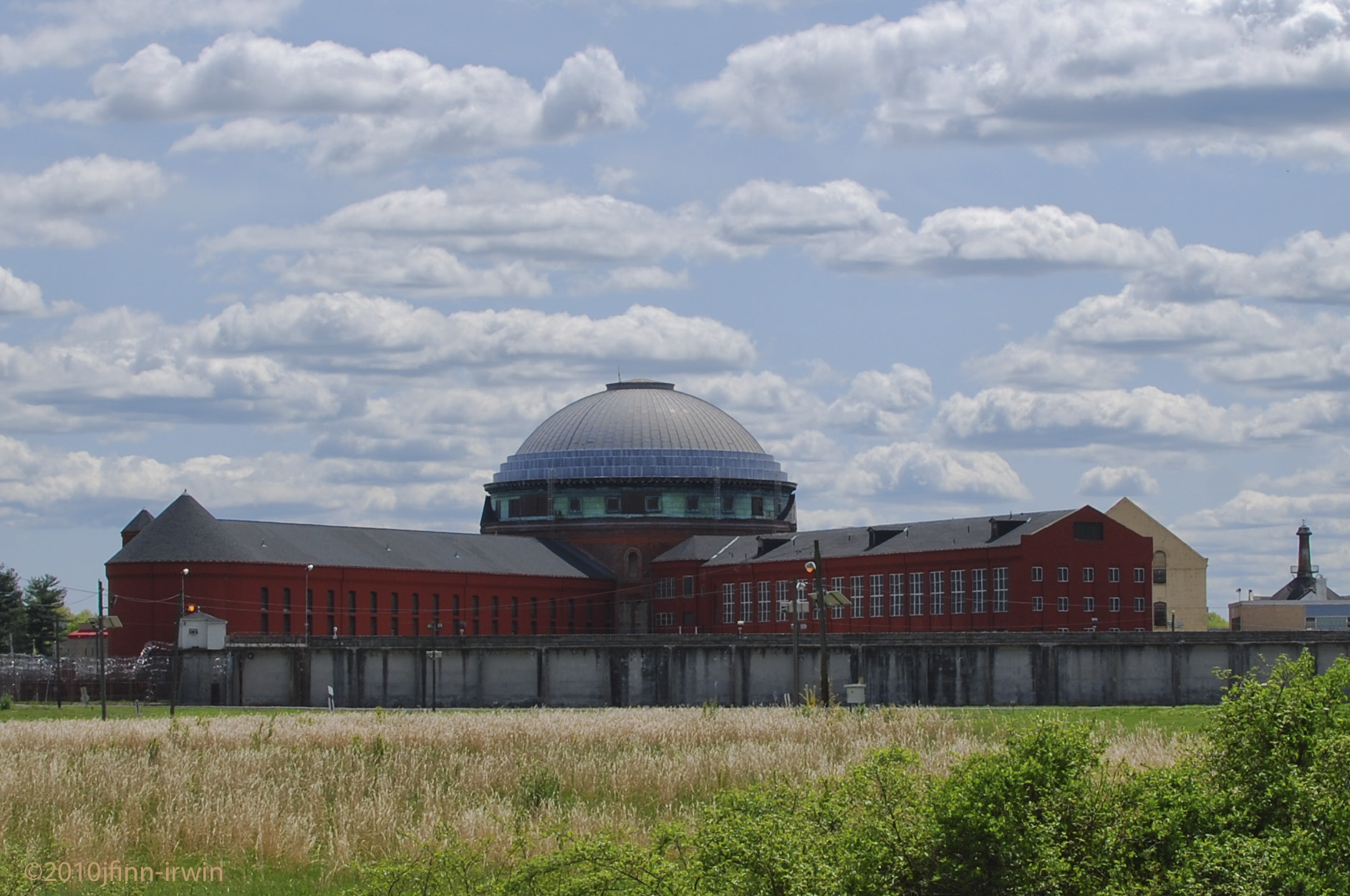
East Jersey State Prison, formerly Rahway, where Carter was imprisoned

Several months later, Bello changed his story, after the police discovered why he was in the area and his theft from the cash register. He positively identified Artis as one of the attackers, while Bradley now came forward to claim Carter was the other; based on this, the two were arrested and indicted. Bello later claimed that in return he was promised the US$10,500 reward offered for catching the killers, though it was never paid.

The rental car had been impounded when Carter and Artis were arrested and retained by police. Five days after their release a detective reported that on searching it again he discovered two unfired rounds, one .32 caliber, the other 12-gauge. Neither matched those retrieved from the victims; the .32 round was brass, rather than copper, while the shotgun shell was an older model, with a different wad and color.

Asked to account for these differences at the trial, the prosecution produced a second report, allegedly lodged 75 minutes after the murders which recorded the two rounds. They were unable to explain why, having that evidence, the police released the men, or why the standard 'bag and tag' procedure was not followed. They also argued that, since the expended rounds retrieved at the scene were also a mixture, the fact that the two rounds did not match was meaningless; what did matter was they were the same caliber as those used in the shootings.

The defense, led by Raymond A. Brown, focused on inconsistencies in the evidence given by eyewitnesses Marins and Bello. He also produced witnesses who confirmed Carter and Artis were still in the Nite Spot at the time of the shootings. The all-white jury convicted both men of first-degree murder, with a recommendation of mercy, so that they were not sentenced to death. Judge Samuel Larner imposed three life sentences upon each defendant. Two consecutive life sentences were imposed upon Carter, with the third life sentence to be concurrent with the second life term. As to Artis, the three life terms were concurrent.

=== Retrial and release ===
In 1974, Bello and Bradley withdrew their identifications of Carter and Artis, and these recantations were used as the basis for a motion for a new trial. Judge Samuel Larner denied the motion on December 11, saying they "lacked the ring of truth".

Despite Larner's ruling, Madison Avenue advertising executive George Lois organized a campaign on Carter's behalf, which led to increasing public support for a retrial or pardon. Boxer Muhammad Ali lent his support to the campaign (including publicly wishing Carter good luck on his appeal during his appearance on The Tonight Show Starring Johnny Carson in September 1973). Bob Dylan co-wrote (with Jacques Levy) and performed a song called "Hurricane" (1975), which declared that Carter was innocent. On December 7, 1975, Dylan performed the song at a concert at Trenton State Prison, where Carter was temporarily an inmate.

During the hearing on the recantations, defense attorneys also argued that Bello and Bradley had lied during the 1967 trial, telling the jurors that they had made only certain narrow, limited deals with prosecutors in exchange for their trial testimony. A detective taped one interrogation of Bello in 1966, and when it was played during the recantation hearing, defense attorneys argued that the tape revealed promises beyond that to which Bello had testified. If so, prosecutors had either had a Brady obligation to disclose this additional exculpatory evidence, or a duty to disclose that their witnesses had lied on the stand.

Larner denied this second argument as well, but the New Jersey Supreme Court unanimously held that the evidence of various deals made between the prosecution and witnesses Bello and Bradley should have been disclosed to the defense before or during the 1967 trial as this could have "affected the jury's evaluation of the credibility" of the eyewitnesses. "The defendants' right to a fair trial was substantially prejudiced", said Justice Mark Sullivan. The court set aside the original convictions and granted Carter and Artis a new trial.

Despite the difficulties of prosecuting a ten-year-old case, Prosecutor Burrell Ives Humphreys decided to try Carter and Artis again. To ensure, as best he could, that he did not use perjured testimony to obtain a conviction, Humphreys had Bello polygraphed—once by Leonard H. Harrelson and a second time by Richard Arther, both well-known and respected experts in the field. Both men concluded that Bello was telling the truth when he said that he had seen Carter outside the Lafayette immediately after the murders.

However, Harrelson also reported orally that Bello had been inside the bar shortly before and at the time of the shooting, a conclusion that contradicted Bello's 1967 trial testimony wherein he had said that he had been on the street at the time of the shooting. Despite this oral report, Harrelson's subsequent written report stated that Bello's 1967 testimony had been truthful.

=== Second conviction and appeal ===
During the new trial in 1976, Alfred Bello repeated his 1967 testimony, identifying Carter and Artis as the two armed men he had seen outside the Lafayette Grill. Bradley refused to cooperate with prosecutors, and neither prosecution nor defense called him as a witness.

The defense responded with testimony from multiple witnesses who identified Carter at the locations he claimed to be when the murders took place. Investigator Fred Hogan, whose efforts had led to the recantations of Bello and Bradley, appeared as a defense witness. Hogan was asked on cross examination whether any bribes or inducements were offered to Bello to secure his recantation, which Hogan denied. His original handwritten notes on his conversations with Bello were entered into evidence. The defense also pointed out the inconsistencies in the testimony of Patricia Valentine, and read the 1967 testimony of William Marins, who had died in 1973, noting that his descriptions of the shooters were drastically different from Artis's and Carter's actual appearances.

The court also heard testimony from a Carter associate that Passaic County prosecutors had tried to pressure her into testifying against Carter. Prosecutors denied the charge. After deliberating for almost nine hours, the jury again found Carter and Artis guilty of the murders. Judge Leopizzi re-imposed the same sentences on both men: a double life sentence for Carter, a single life sentence for Artis.

Artis was released on parole in 1981. Carter's attorneys continued to appeal. In 1982, the Supreme Court of New Jersey affirmed his convictions (4–3). Although the justices felt that the prosecutors should have disclosed Harrelson's oral opinion (about Bello's location at the time of the murders) to the defense, only a minority thought this was material. The majority thus concluded that the prosecution had not withheld information the Brady disclosure law required them to provide to the defense.

According to bail bondswoman Carolyn Kelley, in 1975–1976 she helped raise funds to win a second trial for Carter, which resulted in his release on bail in March 1976. On a fund-raising trip the following month, Kelley said the boxer beat her (Kelley weighed 112 pounds at the time of the alleged beating) severely over a disputed hotel bill. The Philadelphia Daily News reported the alleged beating in a front-page story several weeks later, and celebrity support for Carter quickly eroded, though Carter denied the accusation. Kelley declined to pursue charges, stating that she felt Carter needed help, and saying "I don't want to press charges because jail is not the place for Rubin. He needs treatment. I don't want to do anything to hurt him". Passaic County Judge William Marchese held hearings on the incident in July 1976 and changed the terms of Carter's bail after determining that the assault had occurred. Mae Thelma Basket, whom Carter had married in 1963, divorced him after their second child was born, because she found out that he had been unfaithful to her.

=== Federal court action ===
In 1985, Carter's attorneys filed a petition for a writ of habeas corpus in federal court. Later that year, Judge H. Lee Sarokin of the United States District Court for the District of New Jersey granted the writ, noting that the prosecution had been "predicated upon an appeal to racism rather than reason, and concealment rather than disclosure", and set aside the convictions. Carter, 48 years old, was freed without bail in November 1985.

Prosecutors appealed Sarokin's ruling to the Third Circuit Court of Appeals and filed a motion with the court to return Carter to prison pending the outcome of the appeal. The court denied this motion and eventually upheld Sarokin's opinion, affirming his Brady analysis without commenting on his other rationale.

The prosecutors appealed to the United States Supreme Court, which declined to hear the case.

Prosecutors therefore could have tried Carter (and Artis) a third time, but decided not to, and filed a motion to dismiss the original indictments in 1988. "It is just not legally feasible to sustain a prosecution, and not practical after almost 22 years to be trying anyone", said New Jersey Attorney General W. Cary Edwards. Acting Passaic County Prosecutor John P. Goceljak said several factors made a retrial impossible, including Bello's "current unreliability" as a witness and the unavailability of other witnesses. Goceljak also doubted whether the prosecution could reintroduce the racially motivated crime theory due to the federal court rulings. A judge granted the motion to dismiss, bringing an end to the legal proceedings.

== Post-release ==
According to a Maclean's article published in 1999, after his release, Carter initially lived in the Toronto communal home with the advocates who helped secure his release, before moving out on his own. He was married to Lisa Peters for six years but claimed the marriage was never consummated. He felt the commune was "another prison."

He became a Canadian citizen, and was executive director of the Association in Defence of the Wrongly Convicted (AIDWYC) from 1993 until 2005. Carter resigned when the AIDWYC declined to support Carter's protest of the appointment to a judgeship of Susan MacLean, who was the prosecutor of Canadian Guy Paul Morin, who served over eighteen months in prison for rape and murder until exonerated by DNA evidence.

In 1996, Carter, then 59, was arrested when Toronto police mistakenly identified him as a suspect in his thirties believed to have sold drugs to an undercover officer. He was released after the police realized their error.

Carter often served as a motivational speaker. On October 14, 2005, he received two honorary Doctorates of Law, one from York University (Toronto, Ontario, Canada) and one from Griffith University (Brisbane, Queensland, Australia), in recognition of his work with AIDWYC and the Innocence Project. Carter received the Abolition Award from Death Penalty Focus in 1996.

== Prostate cancer and death ==
In March 2012, while attending the International Justice Conference in Burswood, Western Australia, Carter revealed that he had terminal prostate cancer. At the time, doctors gave him between three and six months to live. Beginning shortly after that time, John Artis lived with and cared for Carter, and on April 20, 2014, he confirmed that Carter, at the age of 76, had died of his illness. He was afterwards cremated and his ashes were scattered in part over Cape Cod and in part at a horse farm in Kentucky.

In the months leading up to his death, Carter had worked for the exoneration of David McCallum, a Brooklyn man who had been incarcerated since 1985 on charges of murder. Two months before his death, Carter published "Hurricane Carter's Dying Wish", an opinion piece in the New York Daily News, in which he asked for an independent review of McCallum's conviction. "I request only that McCallum be granted a full hearing by the Brooklyn conviction integrity unit, now under the auspices of the new district attorney, Ken Thompson. Knowing what I do, I am certain that when the facts are brought to light, Thompson will recommend his immediate release ... Just as my own verdict 'was predicated on racism rather than reason and on concealment rather than disclosure', as Sarokin wrote, so too was McCallum's", Carter wrote. On October 15, 2014, McCallum was exonerated. John Artis died of an abdominal aortic aneurysm on November 7, 2021, at the age of 75.

== In popular culture ==
Carter's story inspired:

- The 1975 Bob Dylan song "Hurricane", which proclaimed that Carter was innocent. Carter appeared as himself in Dylan's 1978 movie Renaldo and Clara. In the 2019 film Rolling Thunder Revue: A Bob Dylan Story by Martin Scorsese, Dylan talked about his involvement with the Carter case and Carter was also interviewed in the film, describing his relationship with Dylan.
- Norman Jewison's 1999 feature film The Hurricane, starring Denzel Washington in the lead role as Carter. The film is about Rubin Carter's accusation, trials, and time spent in prison. Carter later discussed at a lecture how he fell in love with Washington's portrayal of him during auditions for The Hurricane, noting that boxer Marvelous Marvin Hagler and actors Wesley Snipes and Samuel L. Jackson all vied for the role. For his performance as Carter, Washington won the Golden Globe Award for Best Actor – Motion Picture Drama at the 57th Golden Globe Awards. Washington was also nominated for the Academy Award for Best Actor for his performance as Carter at the 72nd Academy Awards.

== Professional boxing record ==
40 fights	27 wins	12 losses
By knockout	19	1
By decision	8	11
Draws	1	

No.	Result	Record	Opponent	Type	Round, time	Date	Location	Notes
40	Loss	27–12–1	Juan Carlos Rivero	PTS	10	Aug 6, 1966	Rosario, Argentina	
39	Draw	27–11–1	Wilbert McClure	MD	10	Mar 8, 1966	Sports Arena, Toledo, Ohio, US	
38	Win	27–11	Ernest Burford	KO	8 (10)	Feb 26, 1966	Orlando Stadium, Johannesburg, South Africa	
37	Loss	26–11	Stan Harrington	UD	10	Jan 25, 1966	Honolulu International Center, Honolulu, Hawaii, US	
36	Loss	26–10	Johnny Morris	SD	10	Jan 18, 1966	Civic Arena, Pittsburgh, Pennsylvania, US	
35	Win	26–9	Wilbert McClure	SD	10	Jan 8, 1966	Aragon Ballroom, Chicago, Illinois, US	
34	Win	25–9	Joe N'Gidi	TKO	2 (10)	Sep 18, 1965	Wembley Stadium, Johannesburg, South Africa	
33	Loss	24–9	Luis Manuel Rodríguez	UD	10	Aug 26, 1965	Olympic Auditorium, Los Angeles, California, US	
32	Win	24–8	Fate Davis	TKO	1 (10), 1:26	Jul 14, 1965	Armory, Akron, Ohio, US	
31	Loss	23–8	Dick Tiger	UD	10	May 20, 1965	Madison Square Garden, New York City, New York, US	
30	Win	23–7	Johnny Torres	TKO	8 (10), 1:38	Apr 30, 1965	Armory, Paterson, New Jersey, US	
29	Loss	22–7	Harry Scott	PTS	10	Apr 20, 1965	Royal Albert Hall, Kensington, London, England	
28	Win	22–6	Harry Scott	TKO	9 (10)	Mar 9, 1965	Royal Albert Hall, Kensington, London, England	
27	Win	21–6	Fabio Bettini	KO	10 (10)	Feb 22, 1965	Palais des Sports, Paris, France	
26	Loss	20–6	Luis Manuel Rodríguez	UD	10	Feb 12, 1965	Madison Square Garden, New York City, New York, US	
25	Loss	20–5	Joey Giardello	UD	15	Dec 14, 1964	Convention Hall, Philadelphia, Pennsylvania, US	For WBA, WBC, and The Ring middleweight titles
24	Win	20–4	Clarence James	TKO	1 (10), 1:54	Jun 24, 1964	Sports Arena, Los Angeles, California, US	
23	Win	19–4	Jimmy Ellis	UD	10	Feb 28, 1964	Madison Square Garden, New York City, New York, US	
22	Win	18–4	Emile Griffith	TKO	1 (10), 2:13	Dec 20, 1963	Civic Arena, Pittsburgh, Pennsylvania, US	
21	Loss	17–4	Joey Archer	SD	10	Oct 25, 1963	Madison Square Garden, New York City, New York, US	
20	Win	17–3	Farid Salim	UD	10	Sep 14, 1963	Civic Arena, Pittsburgh, Pennsylvania, US	
19	Win	16–3	George Benton	SD	10	May 25, 1963	Madison Square Garden, New York City, New York, US	
18	Loss	15–3	Jose Gonzalez	TKO	6 (10)	Mar 30, 1963	Madison Square Garden, New York City, New York, US	
17	Win	15–2	Gomeo Brennan	UD	10	Feb 2, 1963	Madison Square Garden, New York City, New York, US	
16	Win	14–2	Holley Mims	UD	10	Dec 22, 1962	Madison Square Garden, New York City, New York, US	
15	Win	13–2	Florentino Fernández	KO	1 (10), 1:09	Oct 27, 1962	Madison Square Garden, New York City, New York, US	
14	Win	12–2	Mel Collins	TKO	5 (10), 0:42	Oct 8, 1962	Armory, Jersey City, New Jersey, US	
13	Win	11–2	Ernest Burford	TKO	2 (10), 2:17	Aug 4, 1962	Madison Square Garden, New York City, New York, US	
12	Loss	10–2	Ernest Burford	UD	8	Jun 23, 1962	Madison Square Garden, New York City, New York, US	
11	Win	10–1	Sugar Boy Nando	TKO	3 (10), 2:07	May 21, 1962	St. Nicholas Arena, New York City, New York, US	
10	Win	9–1	Walter Daniels	TKO	2 (10), 2:03	Apr 30, 1962	St. Nicholas Arena, New York City, New York, US	
9	Win	8–1	Johnny Tucker	TKO	1 (8), 1:05	Apr 16, 1962	St. Nicholas Arena, New York City, New York, US	
8	Win	7–1	Jimmy McMillan	KO	3 (6)	Mar 16, 1962	Armory, Jersey City, New Jersey, US	
7	Win	6–1	Felix Santiago	KO	1 (8), 1:38	Feb 28, 1962	State Garden, Union City, New Jersey, US	
6	Win	5–1	Tommy Settles	KO	1 (6)	Feb 14, 1962	State Garden, Union City, New Jersey, US	
5	Loss	4–1	Herschel Jacobs	PTS	6	Jan 19, 1962	Gladiators' Arena, Totowa, New Jersey, US	
4	Win	4–0	Herschel Jacobs	PTS	4	Nov 17, 1961	Gladiators' Arena, Totowa, New Jersey, US	
3	Win	3–0	Frank Nelson	TKO	1 (4)	Oct 24, 1961	Alhambra A.C., Philadelphia, Pennsylvania, US	
2	Win	2–0	Joey Cooper	KO	2 (4)	Oct 11, 1961	American Legion Arena, Reading, Pennsylvania, US	
1	Win	1–0	Pike Reed	SD	4	Sep 22, 1961	Navy-Marine Corps Mem. Stadium, Annapolis, Maryland, US	

== See also ==
- List of wrongful convictions in the United States
- Romeo Phillion
- Steve Hearon

== Sources ==
- Bos, Carole D. "Rubin "Hurricane" Carter". Archived from the original on January 17, 2007.
- Carter, Rubin (2011). Eye of the Hurricane: My Path from Darkness to Freedom. Chicago: Lawrence Hill. ISBN 978-1-56976-568-5.
- Chaiton, Sam; Swinton, Terry (2000). Lazarus and the Hurricane: The Freeing of Rubin "Hurricane" Carter. St. Martin's Griffin. ISBN 0-312-25397-4.
- Flatter, Ron. "Sportscentury Biography". Hurricane found peace at storm's center.
- Hirsch, James (2000). Hurricane: The Miraculous Journey of Rubin Carter. Houghton Mifflin Company. ISBN 0-395-97985-4.
- Kelly, Mike (March 26, 2000). "Doubts, errors, unknowns still haunt the case of 'Hurricane' Carter, John Artis". The Record (North Jersey).
- Raab, Selwyn (October 30, 1974). "Two in Court Recant 1967 Testimony That Helped Convict Carter and Artis". New York Times.
- Wice, Paul B (2000). Rubin "Hurricane" Carter and the American Justice System. Rutgers University Press. ISBN 978-0-8135-2864-9.
- "Carter v. Rafferty" (PDF). Archived from the original on June 25, 2003.
