= Louis Fred Pfeifer =

US Marine Corps Medal of Honor recipient (1876–1949)

- Born: June 19, 1876; Philadelphia, Pennsylvania
- Died: February 9, 1949; New Jersey
- Burial place: Egg Harbor City, New Jersey
- Military career
- Allegiance: United States of America
- Branch: United States Marine Corps
- Service years: 1898 - 1917
- Rank: Gunnery Sergeant
- Unit: USS Petrel (PG-2)
- Awards: Medal of Honor

Louis Fred Pfeifer (June 19, 1876 – February 9, 1949) was a private in the United States Marine Corps who received the Medal of Honor for risking his life to rescue several shipmates during a fire aboard USS Petrel (PG-2).

Pfeifer joined the Marine Corps from Philadelphia under the name Louis Fred Theis and served aboard the USS Petrel (PG-2) during engagements in the waters around Manila during the Spanish–American War. When a fire broke out aboard ship and several crew members went missing while trying to extinguish the flames, Pfeifer (under the name of Theis) and several other shipmates risked their lives to rescue them. All eventually received the Medal of Honor for their actions.

After receiving the Medal of Honor he continued to serve in the Marine Corps and upon reenlistment changed his name back to Pfeifer until he was discharged in 1917.

== Early life and military career ==
Pfeifer was born June 19, 1876, in Philadelphia, Pennsylvania. On January 5, 1898, he joined the Marine Corps from Brooklyn, New York. He enlisted under the name Louis F. Theis and served his first enlistment under this name. He was assigned to the marine contingent aboard the USS Petrel (PG-2) when it was sent as part of Admiral George Dewey's fleet in the campaign against Manila during the Spanish–American War in the Battle of Manila Bay.

=== Medal of Honor action ===
On the morning of March 31, 1901, while off Cavite in Manila Bay, a fire started aboard the Petrel originating in the sail room. The sail room was a small compartment in the bottom of the ship, adjacent to the magazine and was accessible only by a hatchway from the berth deck above. Several members of the ship's crew, led by the ship's captain, Lieutenant Commander Jesse M. Roper took turns entering the compartment and fighting the blaze. The fire produced no visible flames but thick, acrid smoke and fumes filled the area. The sail room was also pitch black; the ship's electric generator had been turned off at dawn, and no other lamps would work in the harsh atmosphere of the compartment. A number of men, including Roper, were overcome by the bad air and were pulled out of the sail room semi-conscious. As the fumes grew thicker and more noxious, Roper ordered everyone out of the compartment, but one sailor, Seaman Patrick Toner, did not emerge from the room. When a sound was heard from below, believed to be Toner fighting for breath, four men descended to rescue him, including Roper (not fully recovered from his first trip below). When the four men did not return, Seaman Alphonse Girandy tied a rope around his waist and climbed down the ladder, finding Kessler and Flaherty, both semi-conscious, and passing them up to be hauled through the hatchway. He found Toner at the bottom of the ladder and, although losing consciousness himself, held on to him as the sailors above pulled both men out of the compartment. Lieutenant J.S. McKean, with a rope around his waist, was next into the sail room, followed by Private Louis F. Thies (Pfiefer) and Seaman Thomas Cahey. As McKean searched in the darkness for the two men still missing, Lieutenant Commander Roper and Cadet Lewis, the ship's generator finally came back online. With the help of a lamp lowered through the hatchway, McKean could see Roper and Lewis slumped against the walls of the compartment. McKean dragged Roper to the ladder to be hauled out and then, with the help of Theis and Cahey, rescued Lewis, just before losing consciousness himself. The fire was extinguished later that day; Roper was killed by the fumes, but the other men all eventually recovered. For their actions during the incident, Cahey, Girandy, and Thies were each awarded the Medal of Honor. Pfeifer received his medal on March 22, 1902, while still going by the name of Louis Fred Theis. His complete citation states:

Serving on board the U.S.S. Petrel; for heroism and gallantry, fearlessly exposing his own life to danger for the saving of the others on the occasion of the fire on board that vessel, 31 March 1901.

== Later life ==
Pfeifer continued to serve in the Marine Corps and changed his name back to Pfeifer upon reenlistment. He was dishonorably discharged from the Marine Corps September 2, 1917.

== See also ==
- List of Medal of Honor recipients during peacetime
