= Bulkley =

Bulkley is a surname. Notable persons with that surname include:

- Chauncey Bulkley (1798–1860), American lawyer from Pennsylvania
- Lucius Duncan Bulkley (1845–1928), American dermatologist
- Mary Bulkley (1747/48–1792), British actress and dancer
- Peter Bulkley (1583–1659), English-born Puritan preacher and American colonist
- Robert J. Bulkley (1880–1965), American congressman and senator from Ohio
- James Barry (surgeon) (c.1789–1865), Irish military surgeon, born Margaret Anne Bulkley

== See also ==
- Bulkley River, British Columbia, Canada
- Bulkley Valley, formed by the above-mentioned river
