= John Gwinn =

United States Navy officer (1791–1849)

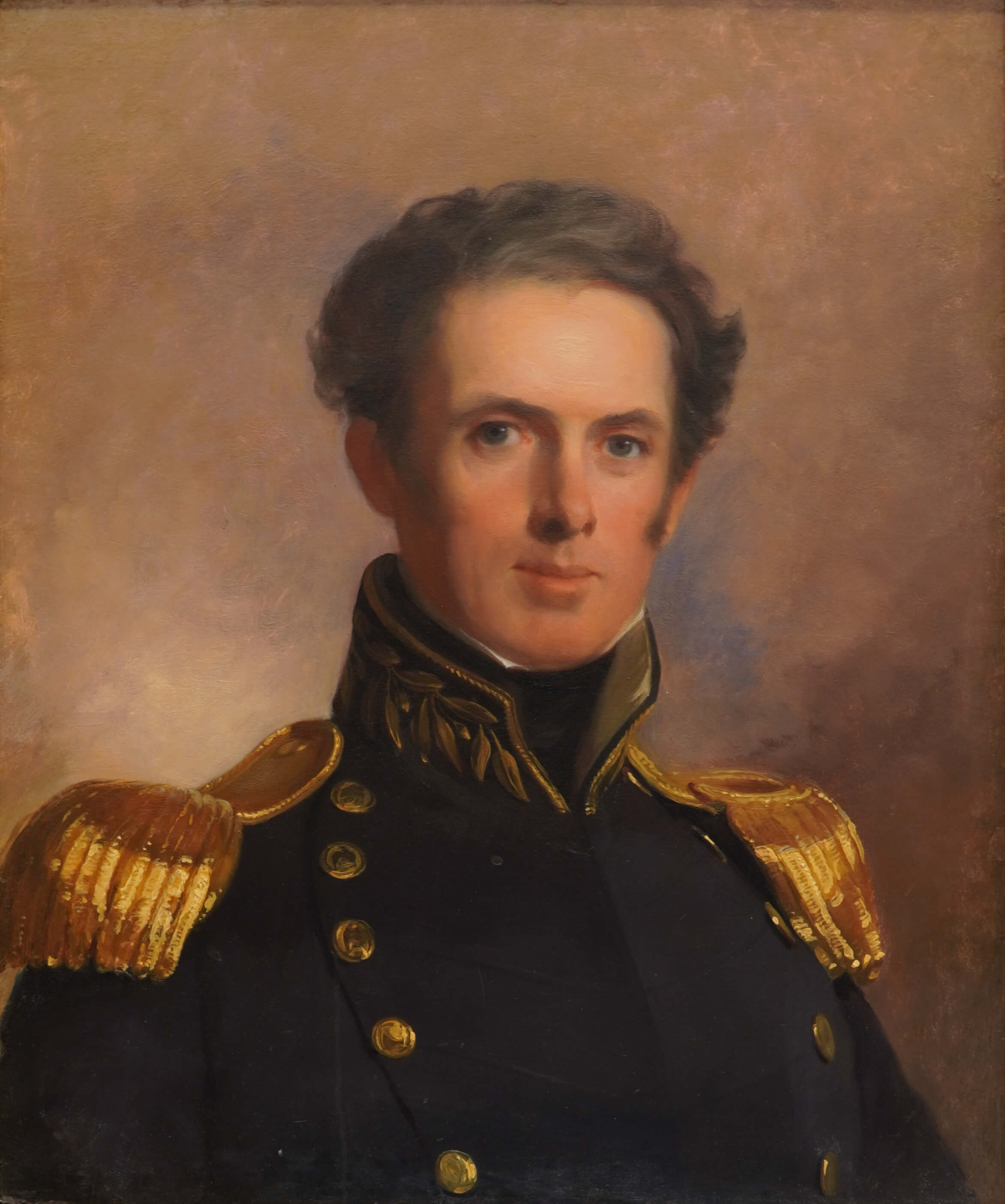
- Portrait by Thomas Sully, c. 1837
- Born: John Gwinn III; June 11, 1791; Maryland, U.S.
- Died: September 1, 1849 (aged 58) Palermo, Italy
- Buried: Arlington National Cemetery
- Allegiance: United States
- Branch: United States Navy
- Rank: Captain
- Commands: Frolic; Vandalia; USS Constitution
- Conflicts: War of 1812

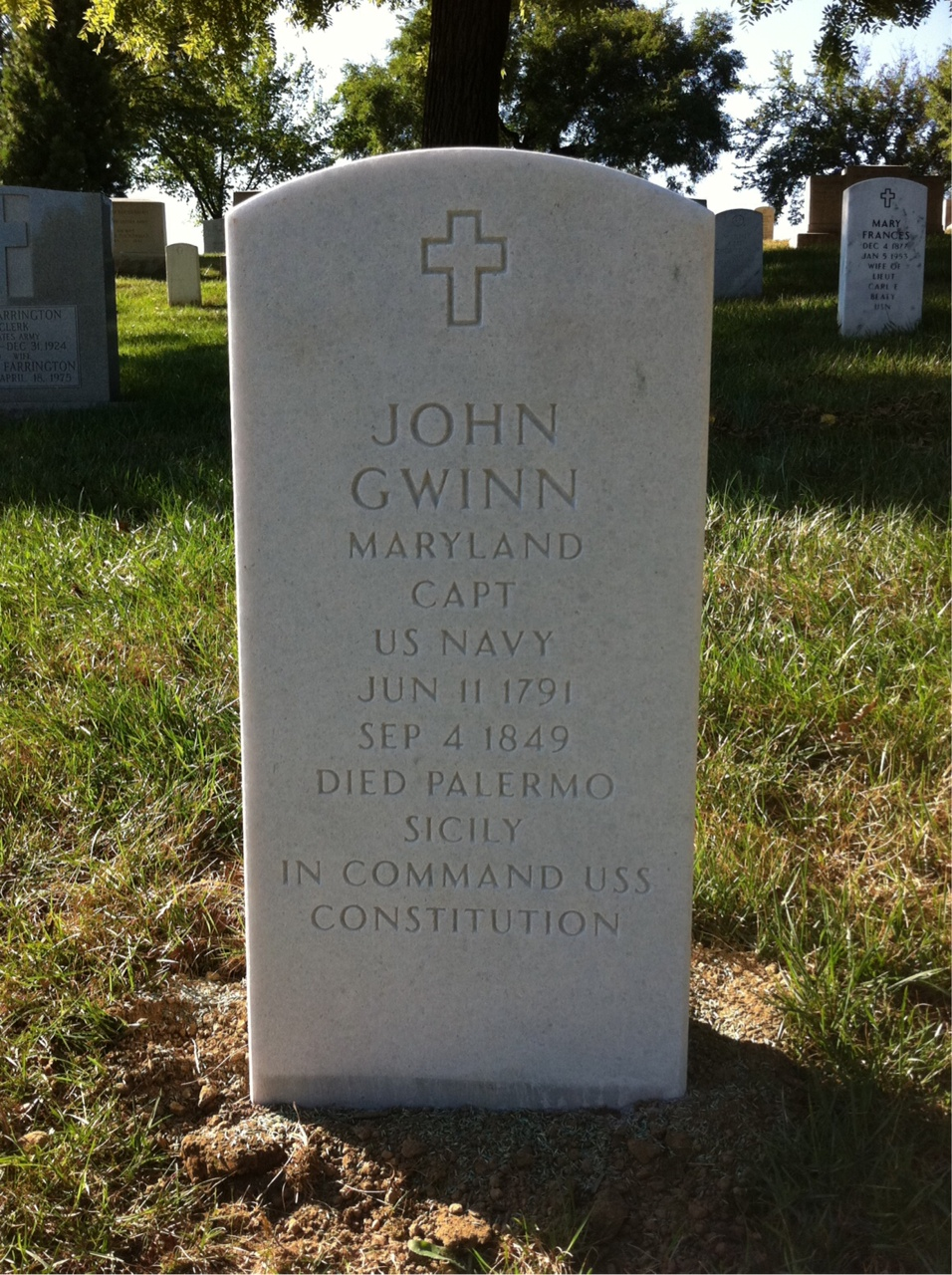
Grave at Arlington National Cemetery

John Gwinn III (June 11, 1791 – September 1, 1849) was a United States Navy officer born in Maryland. During the War of 1812, he was a POW after the Royal Navy had captured Frolic in 1814 and he later commanded Vandalia.

As captain of USS Constitution, Gwinn sailed on December 9, 1848 and arrived at Tripoli on January 19, 1849. While transporting U.S. ambassador Daniel Smith McCauley and his family to Egypt, McCauley's wife gave birth to a son, who was named Constitution Stewart McCauley. At Gaeta on August 1 Gwinn received on board King Ferdinand II and Pope Pius IX. This would be the first time a Pope had set foot on American territory. At Palermo on September 1, 1849, Captain Gwinn died of chronic gastritis and was buried near Lazaretto on the 9th, ending a 40-year Navy career. Gwinn's body was moved to Glenwood Cemetery in Philadelphia, Pennsylvania a few years later and remained there until 1931 when he was reinterred at Arlington National Cemetery, in Arlington, Virginia.

== Bibliography ==
- Martin, Tyrone G. (1997). A Most Fortunate Ship: A Narrative History of "Old Ironsides". Naval Institute Press. ISBN 1-55750-588-8. OCLC 243901224.
