= Northwood Cemetery =

Cemetery in Philadelphia, Pennsylvania

- Interactive map of Northwood Cemetery

Details
- Established: 1878
- Location: 15th and Haines streets Philadelphia, Pennsylvania
- Country: United States
- Coordinates: 40.0607°N 75.1445°W
- Type: private
- Find a Grave: Northwood Cemetery

Northwood Cemetery is a cemetery located in the West Oak Lane neighborhood of Philadelphia, Pennsylvania, It was established in 1878.

== Notable interments ==
- George Bradley (1852–1931) Major League Baseball player
- Duke Esper (1868–1910) Major League Baseball Player Born Charles Esbacher.
- William "Kid" Gleason (1866–1933) Major League Baseball player and manager
- Eddie Griffin (1982–2007) Professional Basketball player
- George Hesselbacher, Major League Baseball player
- John Miller (1839–1882) Civil War Congressional Medal of Honor Recipient (true name Henry Fey). He was a Private in the 8th New York Cavalry.
- Frank Bernard Nicholls (1877–1924), English-American golf professional
- Sister Rosetta Tharpe (1915–1973), gospel singer, songwriter, and recording artist
- Dave Zearfoss (1868–1945), professional Baseball player

The cemetery contains five Commonwealth war graves, a Canadian Army soldier of World War I and 4 British naval personnel of World War II.
