= Philadelphia National Cemetery =

Historic veterans cemetery in Pennsylvania

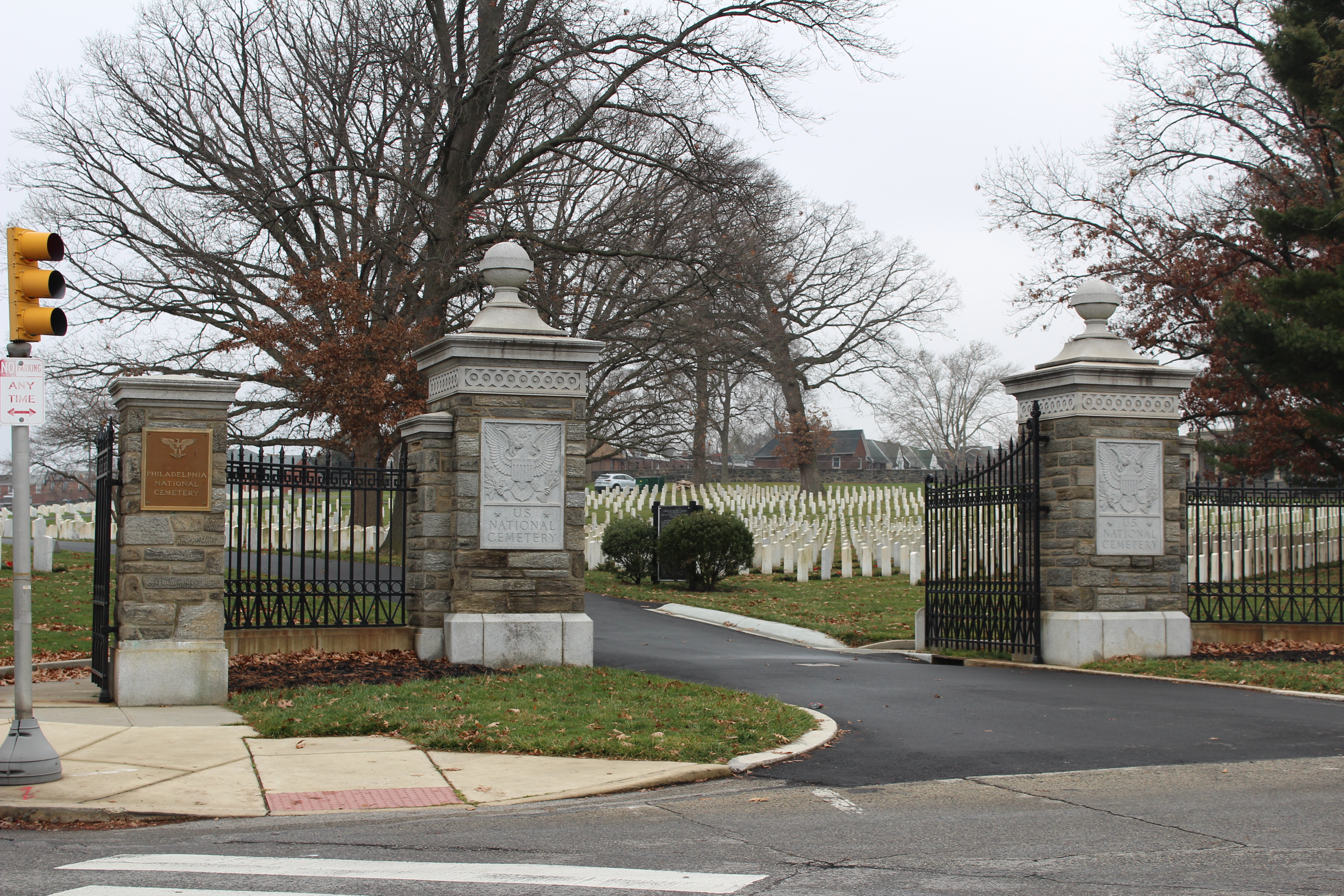
- New gates constructed in 1940.
- Interactive map of Philadelphia National Cemetery

Details
- Established: 1862; 164 years ago
- Location: Philadelphia, Pennsylvania
- Country: United States
- Coordinates: 40°03′31″N 75°09′18″W
- Type: National Cemetery
- Owned by: United States Department of Veterans Affairs
- Size: 13.3 acres (54,000 m^{2})
- No. of graves: 13,202
- Website: Philadelphia National Cemetery
- Philadelphia National Cemetery
- U.S. National Register of Historic Places
- Location within Pennsylvania
- Location: Jct. of Haines St. and Limekiln Rd., Philadelphia, Pennsylvania
- Coordinates: 40°03′31″N 75°09′18″W
- MPS: Civil War Era National Cemeteries MPS
- NRHP reference No.: 97000775
- Added to NRHP: July 24, 1997

Philadelphia National Cemetery is a United States National Cemetery located in the West Oak Lane neighborhood of Philadelphia, Pennsylvania. It was established in 1862 as nine leased lots in seven private cemeteries in the Philadelphia region. The current location was established in 1881, and the remains of soldiers were reinterred from the various leased lots. It is administered by the United States Department of Veterans Affairs, and managed from offices at Washington Crossing National Cemetery. It is 13 acres in size and contains 13,202 burials.

The cemetery contains monuments commemorating the reinterment of soldiers from the Battle of Germantown and the Mexican–American War. A Confederate Soldiers and Sailors Monument was dedicated in 1912 to honor the reinterment of 184 Confederate prisoners of war who died in Philadelphia area hospitals and camps during the American Civil War.

In 1997, the cemetery was added to the National Register of Historic Places.

== History ==
It was established in 1862 as one of the original 14 National Cemeteries for the burial of American Civil War soldiers. The cemetery initially consisted of nine leased lots in seven privately owned cemeteries. In 1881, Quartermaster General Montgomery C. Meigs recommended the consolidation of all veteran interments in Philadelphia into one cemetery. The U.S. Federal Government purchased 13.32 acres (5.39 ha) from Henry J. and Susan B. Freeman in 1885. A federal superintendent was appointed in 1869 for the "number of burials in seven incorporated cemeteries near the city of Philadelphia." Remains were reinterred from seven cemeteries in the Philadelphia area: Lafayette, Lebanon, United American Mechanics Association, Odd Fellows, The Woodlands, Glenwood, Mount Moriah, Bristol, Chester and Whitehall.

The cemetery contains the burial of 350 United States Colored Troops who fought in the Civil War and trained at Camp William Penn in Cheltenham Township, Pennsylvania. It also contains the burial of 66 Buffalo Soldiers from the 9th and 10th Cavalry Regiments and the 24th and 25th Infantry Regiments.

In 1912, the Philadelphia chapter of the United Daughters of the Confederacy sponsored the installation of a nine-foot tall granite stone memorial to recognize the 184 Confederate soldiers and sailors buried at the cemetery. It was dedicated on October 12, 1912 on the 42nd anniversary of the death of Robert E. Lee. The dedication was attended by approximately 1,000 people.

The Mexican-American War monument was erected by the Scott Legion to recognize the 169 men from that conflict buried in Glenwood Cemetery. The soldiers were originally interred at Glenwood Cemetery and were reinterred to Philadelphia National Cemetery in 1927. The Mexican-American War monument was also relocated to the Philadelphia National Cemetery.

There are two structures on the property - a utility shed built in 1936 and a rostrum built in 1939.

As of September 30, 2008, Philadelphia National Cemetery had 13,202 interments. This number is not expected to change significantly as the cemetery has been closed for new interments since September 1962, except for those in reserved plots and in plots opened by disinterments.

== Notable interments ==
- Alphonse Girandy (1868-1941), United States Navy sailor, Medal of Honor recipient
- Galusha Pennypacker (1844-1916), Major General during the American Civil War, Medal of Honor recipient
- Louis Santop (1890-1942), Baseball Hall of Fame catcher

== Images ==
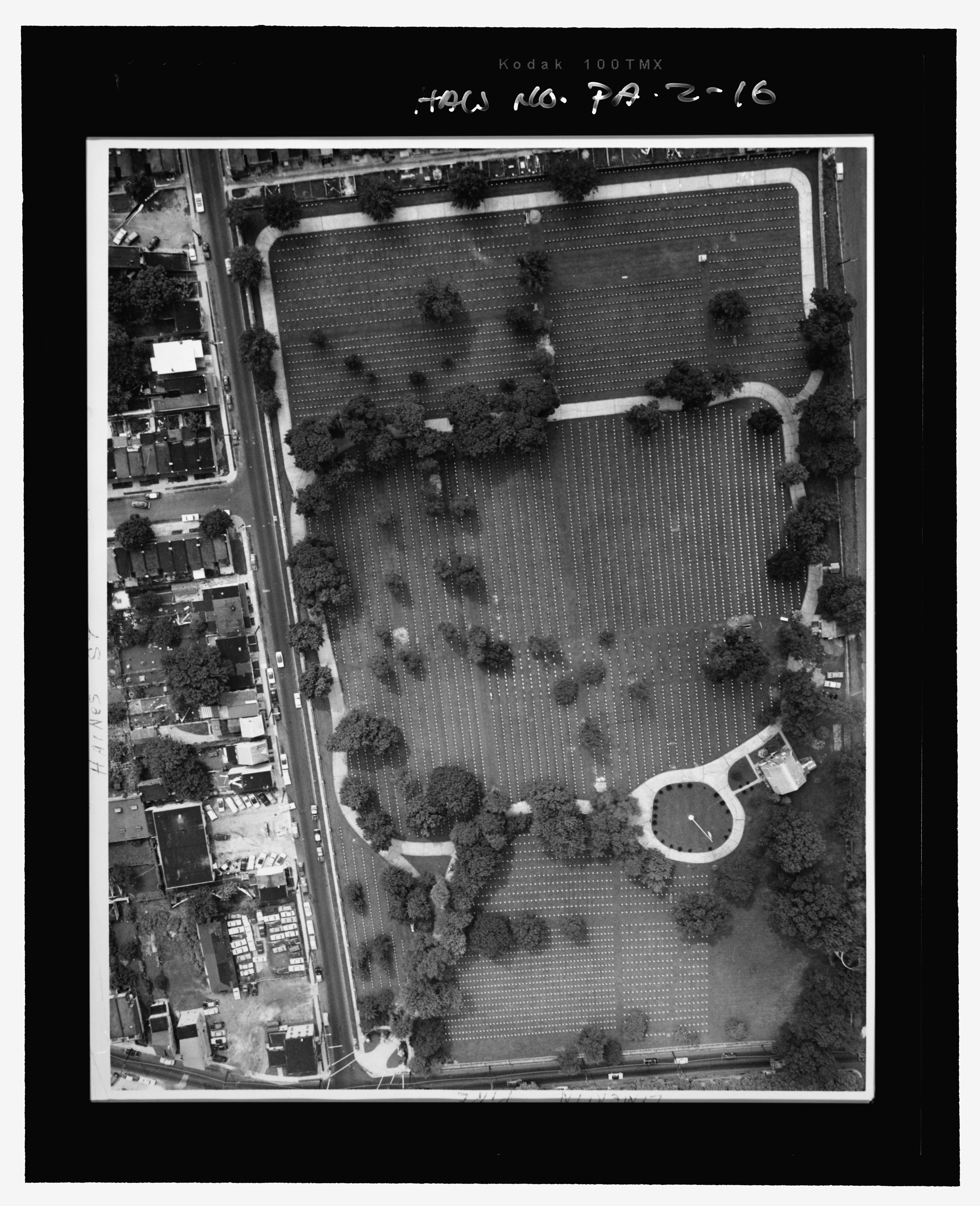
Aerial View of cemetery

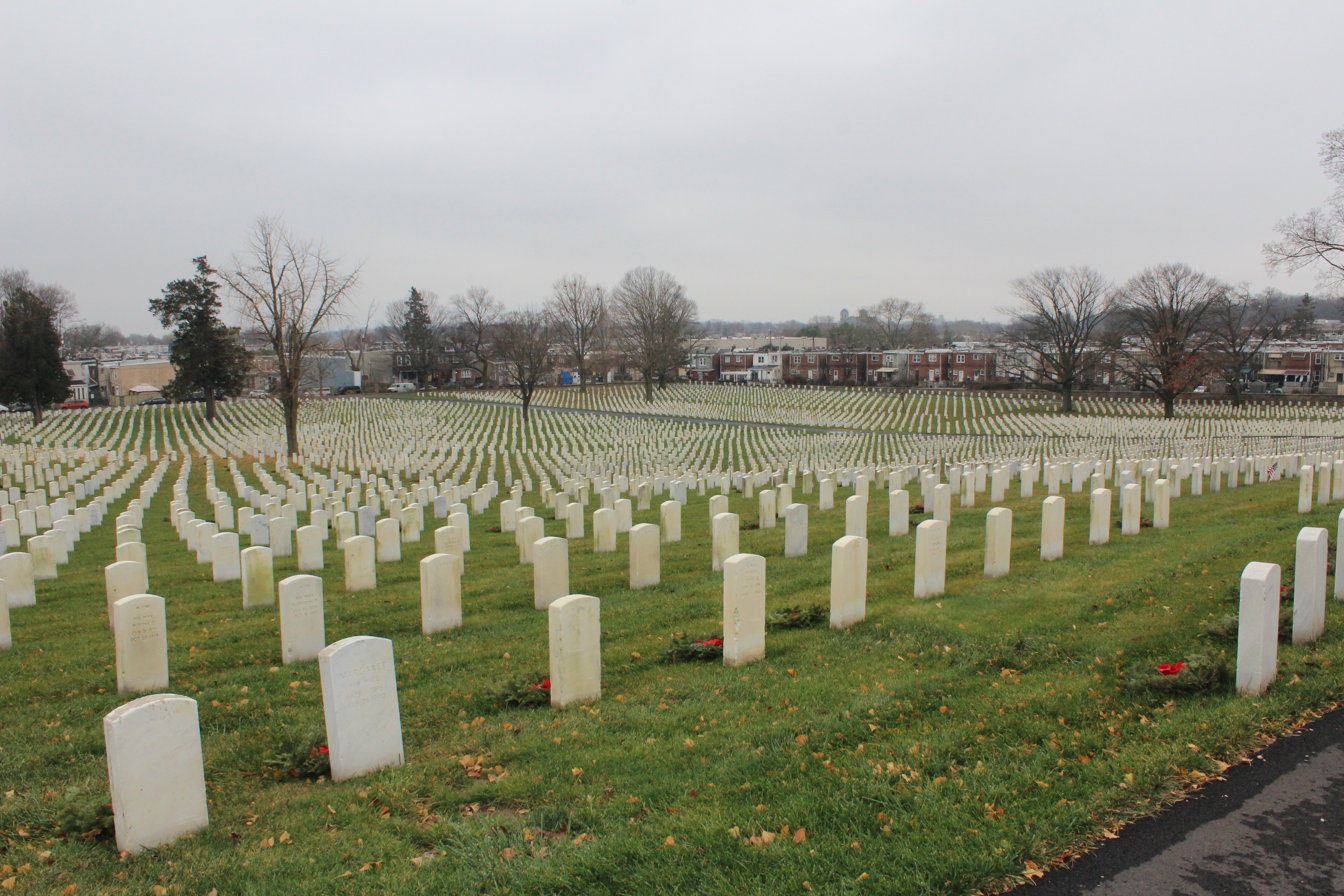
View from top of hill

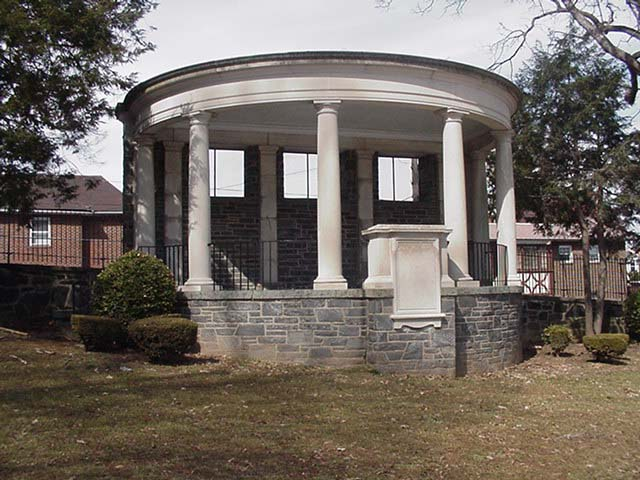
The original rostrum built in 1887 was replaced in 1939

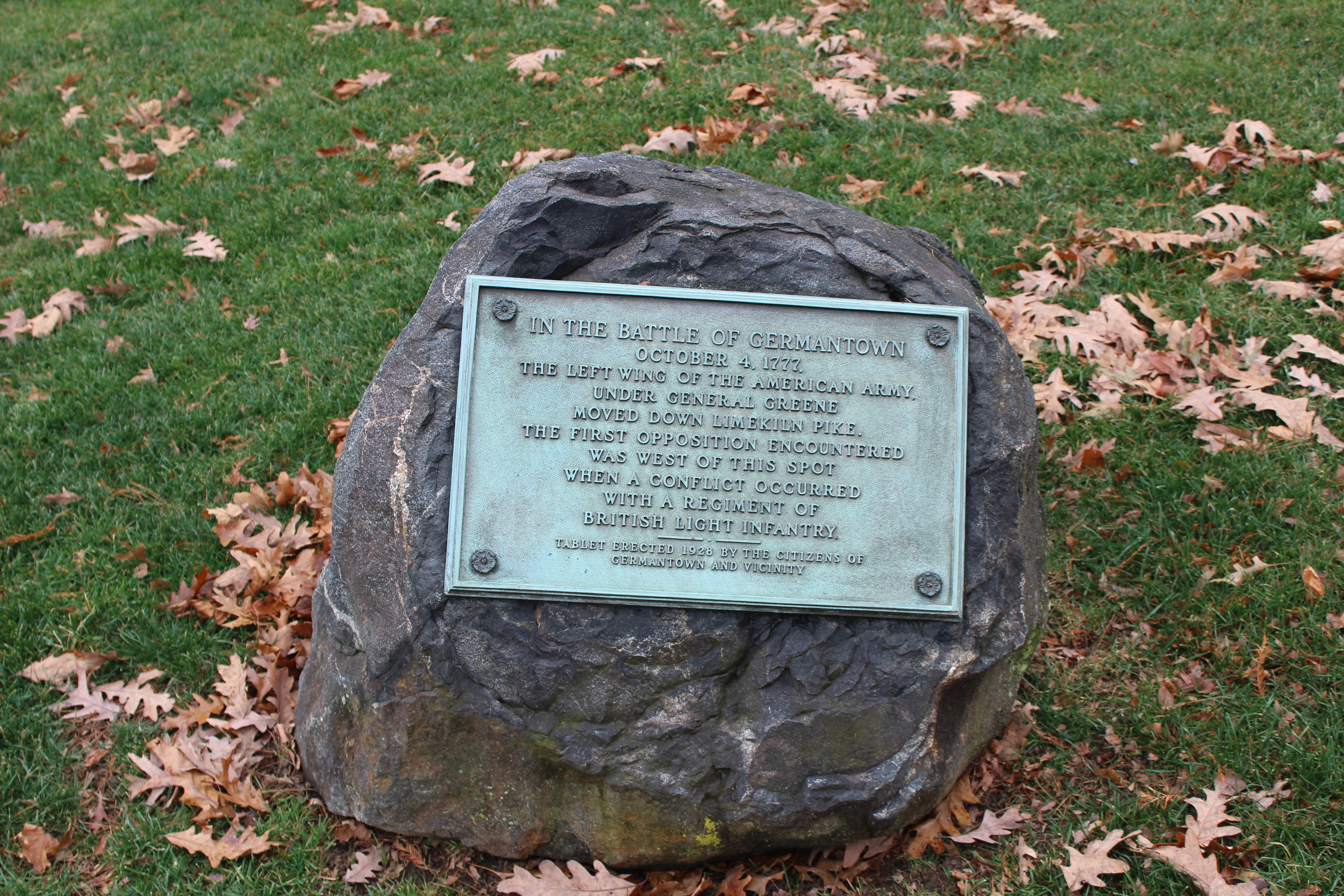
Battle of Germantown Monument

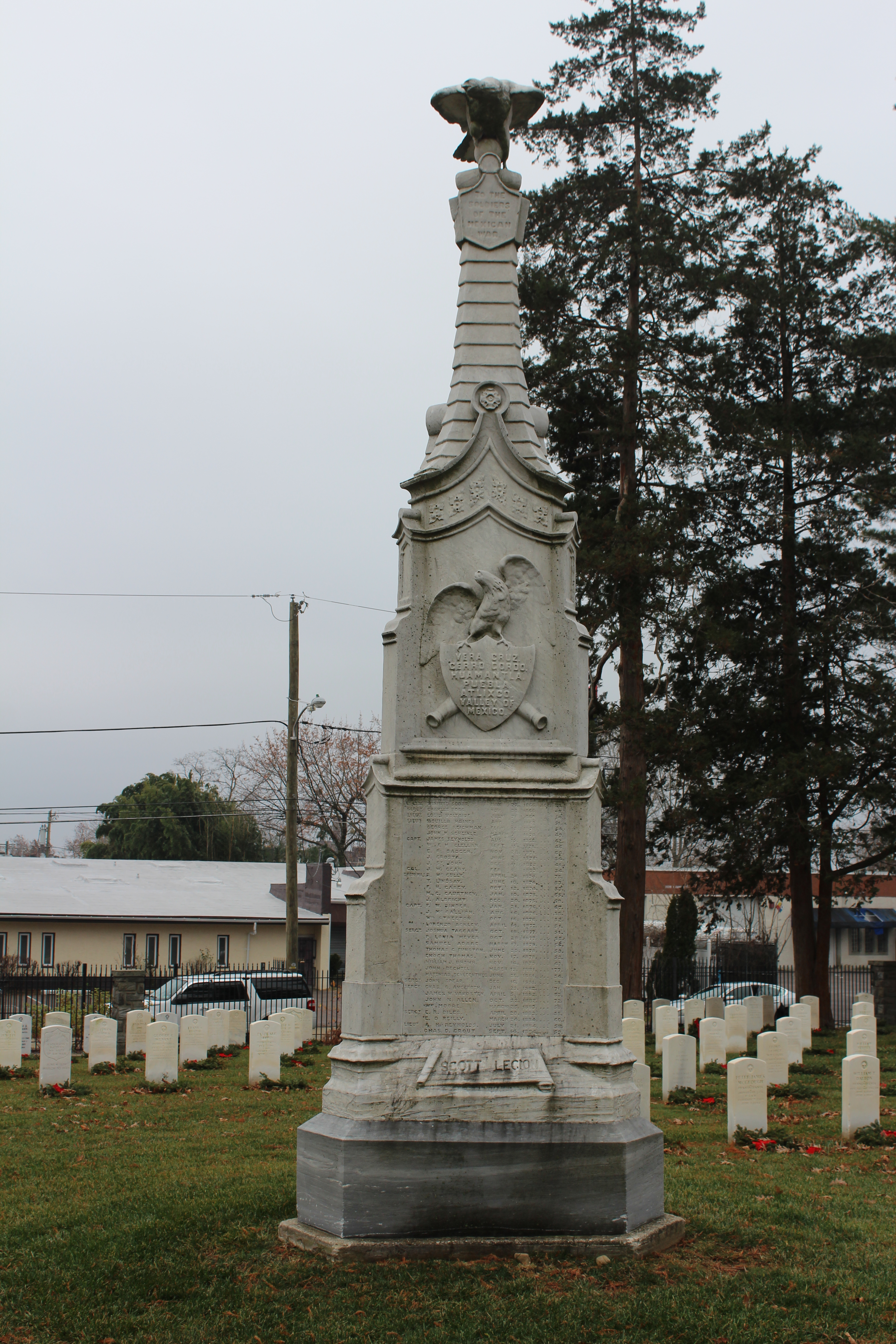
Mexican-American War Memorial

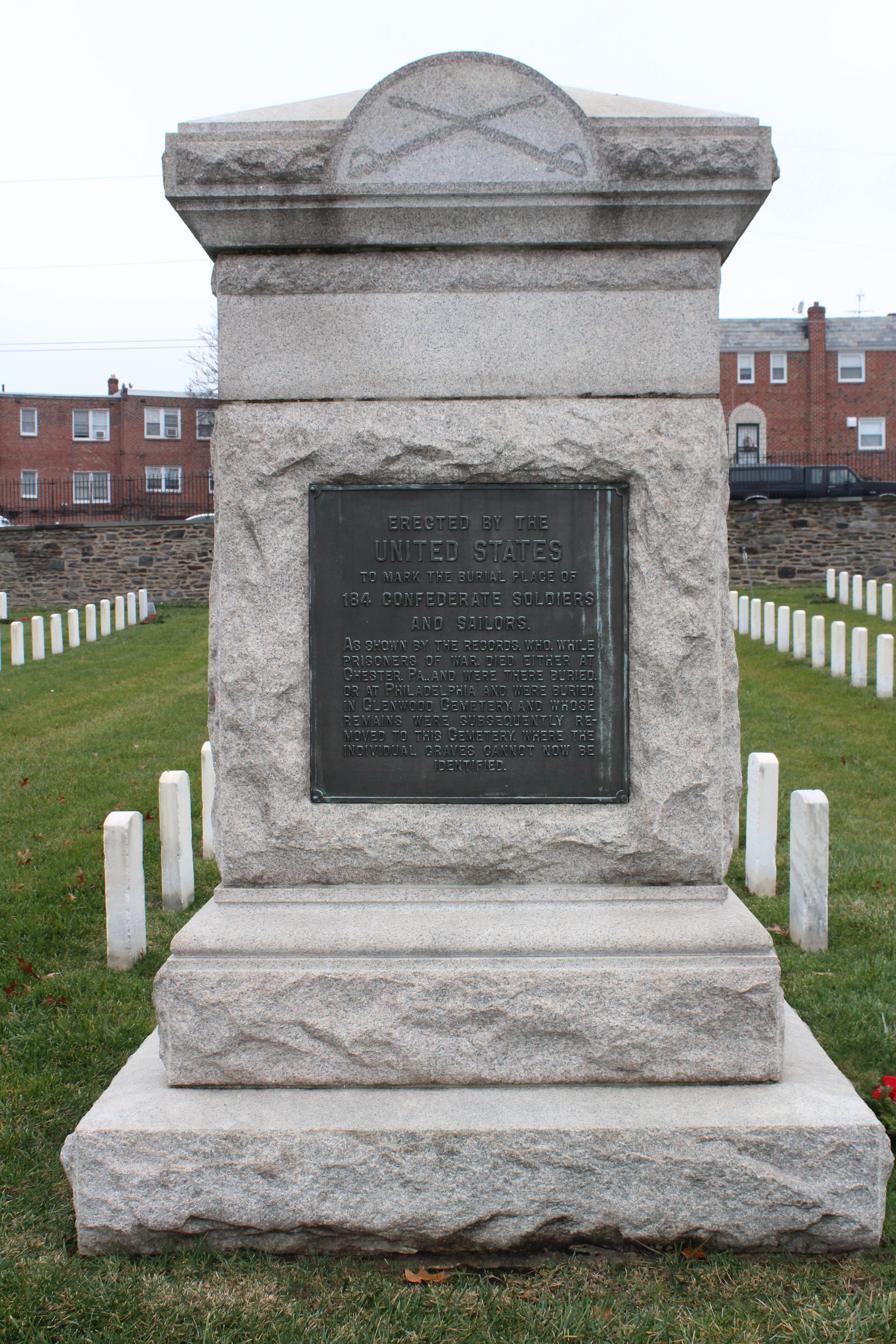
Memorial to the 184 Confederate soldiers and sailors interred at the cemetery

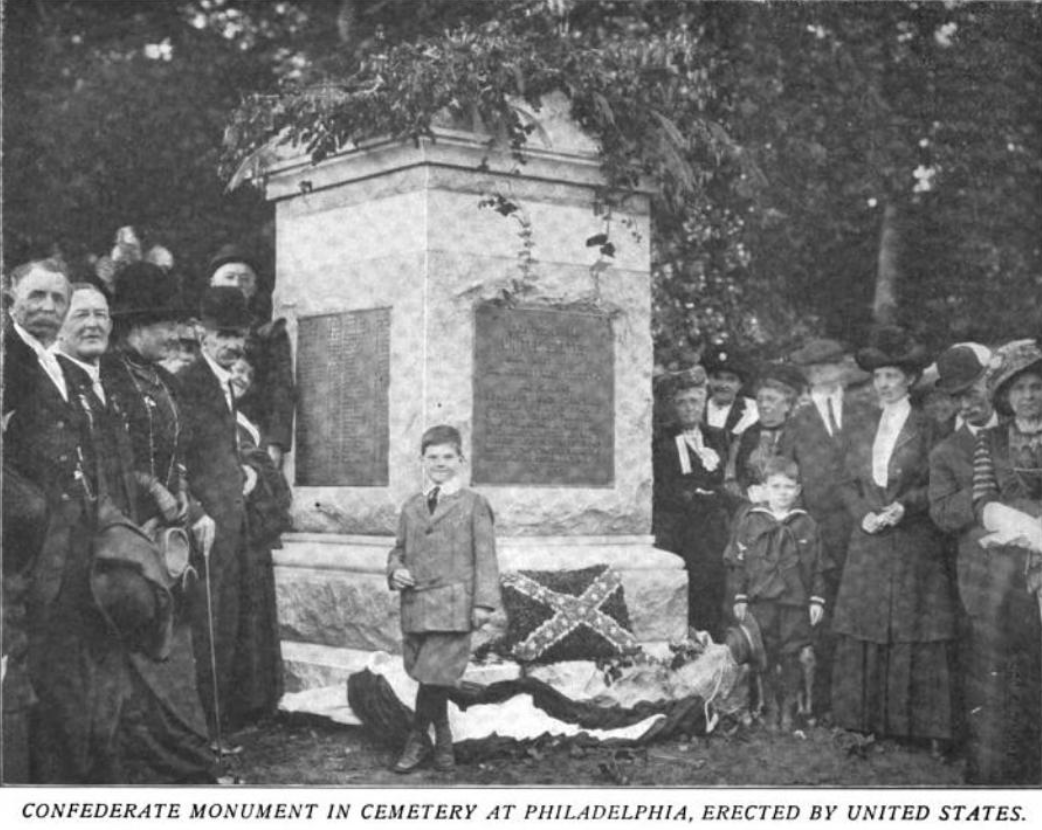
Photo of the Confederate Monument Dedication Ceremony

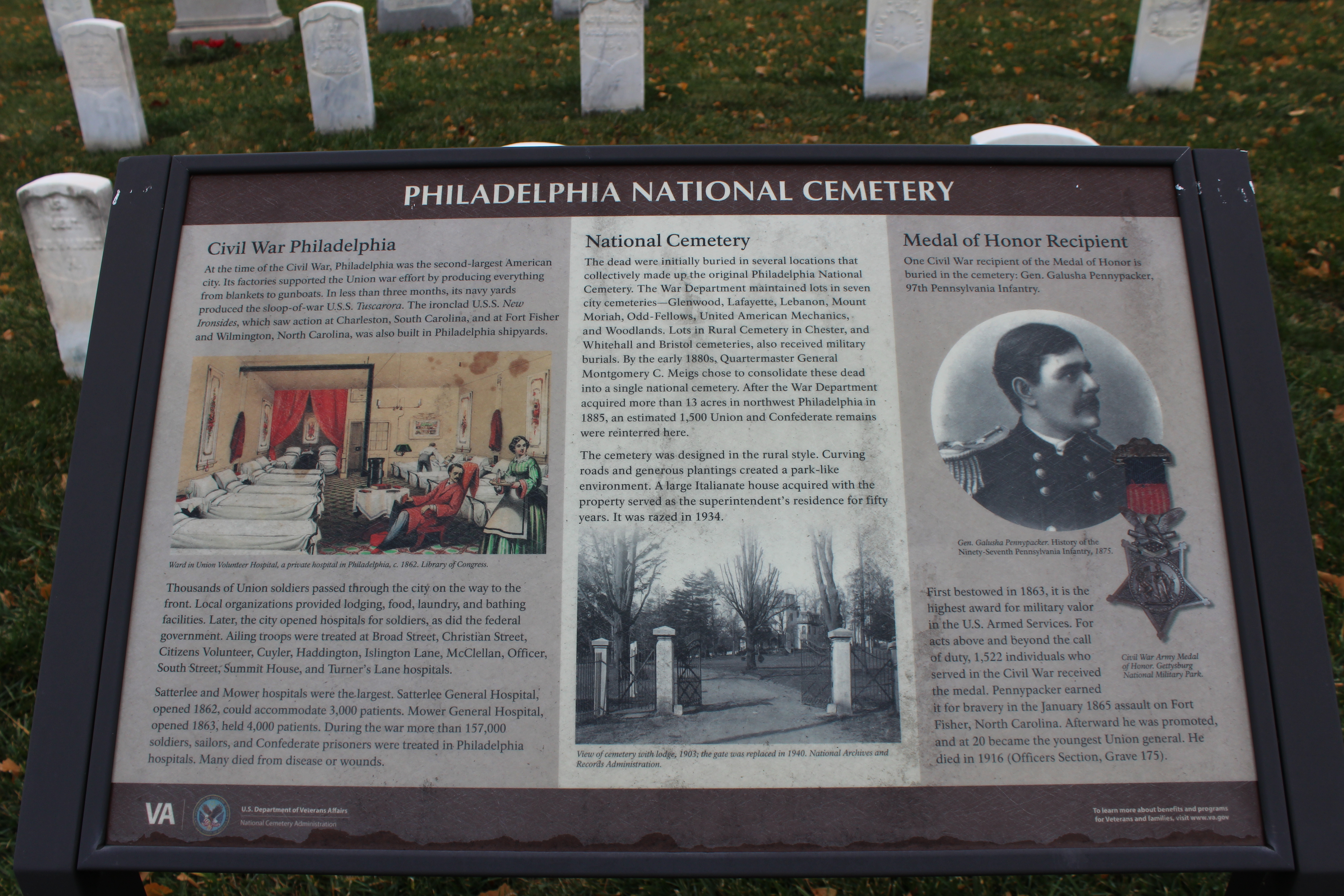
Storyboard about the Philadelphia National Cemetery and Galusha Pennypacker

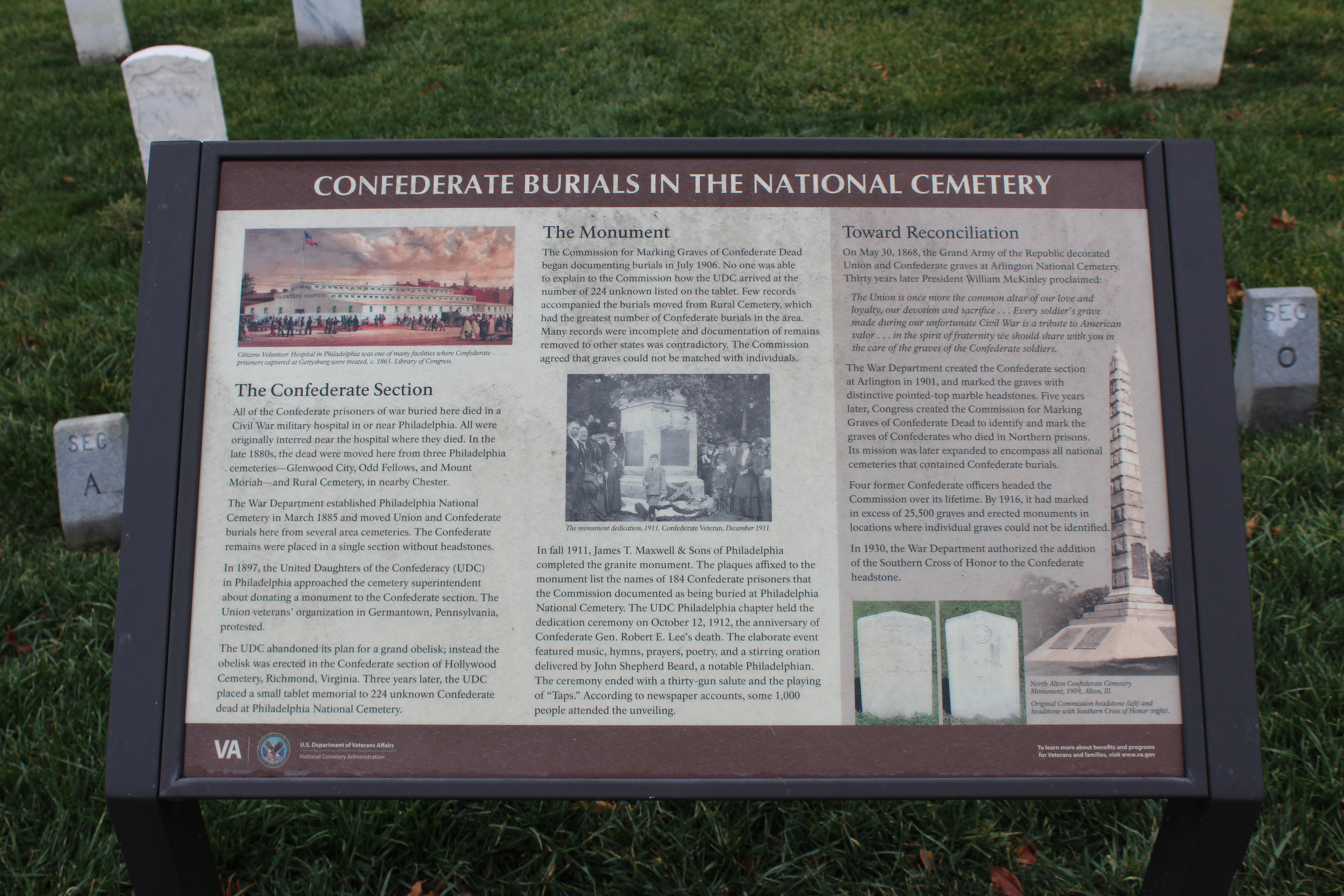
Storyboard about the Confederate burials in Philadelphia National Cemetery
