= John Miller (Medal of Honor, 1865) =

- Born: c. 1839; Electorate of Hesse
- Died: March 8, 1882
- Military career
- Allegiance: United States of America; Union
- Branch: Union Army
- Service years: 1863–1865
- Rank: Private
- Units: (New York (state)) Company H, 8th New York Volunteer Cavalry Regiment
- Conflicts: American Civil War • Battle of Waynesboro, Virginia
- Awards: Medal of Honor

John Miller (c. 1839 – March 8, 1882) won a Medal of Honor for his service during the American Civil War. He was born Henry Fey.

== Biography ==
He was born on 1839 in the Electorate of Hesse.

Miller enlisted in the Army from Rochester, New York in December 1863. He earned the Medal of Honor for his actions on March 2, 1865 in Waynesboro, Virginia during the Battle of Waynesboro. His citation reads, "capture of flag." He mustered out with his regiment in June 1865.

Following his death in 1882, he was initially interred at Glenwood Cemetery in Philadelphia, Pennsylvania, however he was reinterred to Northwood Cemetery in Philadelphia.
