= Glenwood Memorial Gardens =

Cemetery in Broomall, Pennsylvania, U.S.

Coordinates: 39°59′07″N 75°21′09″W

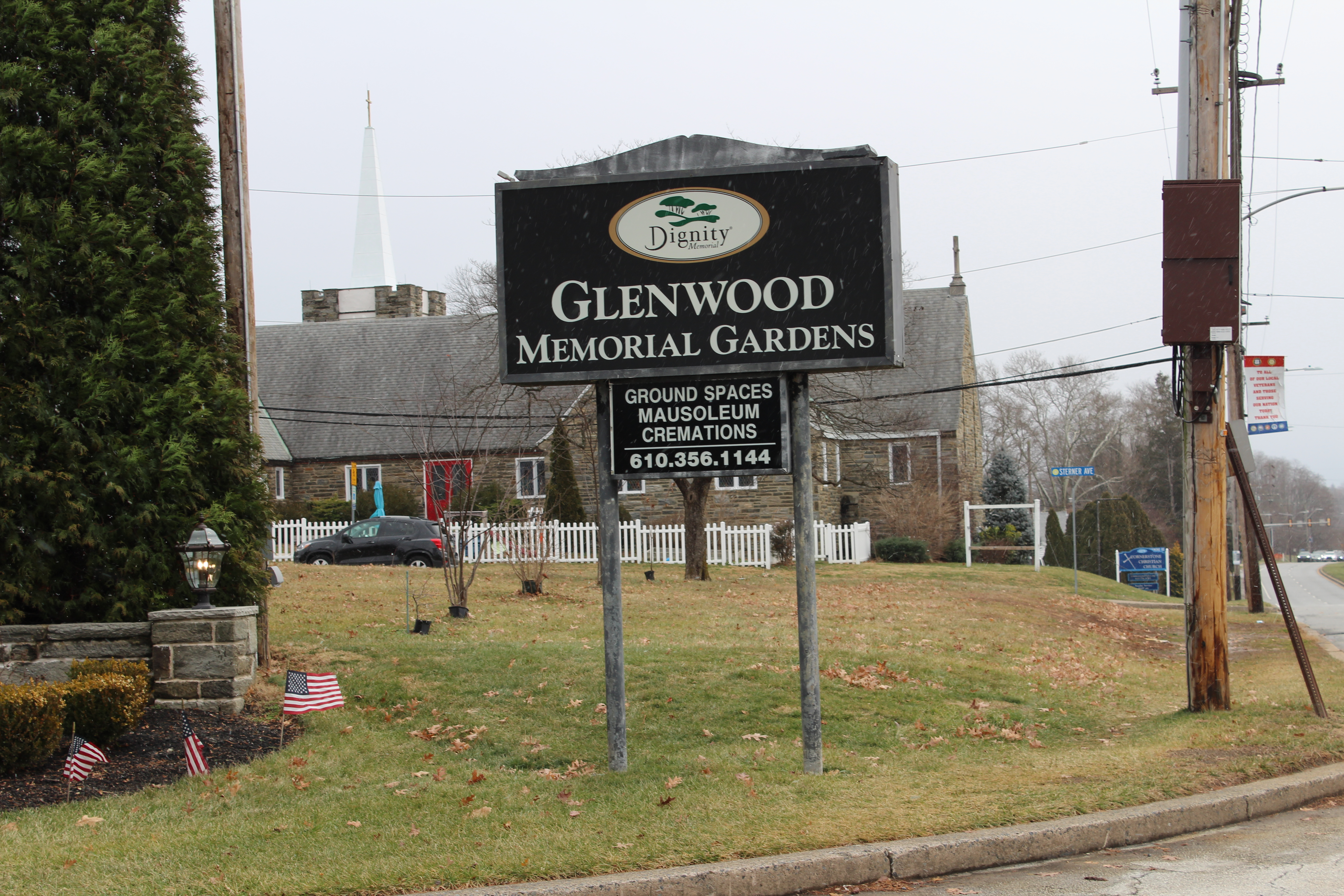
- Glenwood Memorial Gardens Entrance Sign
- Interactive map of Glenwood Memorial Gardens

Details
- Established: 1849
- Location: 2321 West Chester Pike, Broomall, Pennsylvania, U.S.
- Country: United States
- Type: private
- Owned by: Service Corporation International
- No. of graves: ~23,000
- Website: Official website
- Find a Grave: Glenwood Memorial Gardens

Glenwood Memorial Gardens is a 70-acre lawn cemetery in Broomall, Pennsylvania. It was originally established in 1849 as a rural cemetery on 20 acres in North Philadelphia as Glenwood Cemetery. Over 700 Union army and Confederate States Army soldiers who died in local hospitals during the American Civil War were buried in the old Glenwood Cemetery. The soldiers' remains were moved to the Philadelphia National Cemetery in 1891.

By the 1920s, Glenwood Cemetery had fallen into disrepair, suffered from vandalism and was the target for new development. The City of Philadelphia closed the cemetery to new burials in 1921 and many families relocated graves, including the famous Barrymore family of actors. New Glenwood Cemetery was established in 1923 on farm land in Broomall. The remains of 169 Mexican–American War veterans were reinterred to the Philadelphia National Cemetery in 1927, and the 20-foot high marble monument to their honor was moved with them.

Old Glenwood Cemetery was closed by the City of Philadelphia in 1938 and 20,000 burials were relocated to New Glenwood Cemetery. The cemetery expanded after World War II and was renamed Glenwood Memorial Gardens. It is currently owned by Service Corporation International, the largest cemetery provider in the United States.

== Old Glenwood cemetery ==
Glenwood cemetery was first established in 1849 by William Curtis and Francis Knox Morton at 27th Street & Islington Avenue in Philadelphia. It was 20 acres in size and was created in the popular mid-19th century style of rural cemetery design. The first burials occurred in February 1850 and consisted mostly of members of the Odd Fellows fraternal organization.

In 1852, the Scott Legion, named in honor of commanding General Winfield Scott, sponsored the installation of a monument to recognize the soldiers who fought in the Mexican-American War as part of the First and Second Regiments of the Pennsylvania Volunteers. The 20-foot tall, three-sided marble monument was dedicated on April 18, 1855, on the anniversary of the Battle of Cerro Gordo. Joel Barlow Sutherland was one of the speakers at the dedication ceremony. In 1885, the Pennsylvania Legislature, appropriated money to the Scott Legion for them to expand the burial vault for veterans of the Mexican-American War.

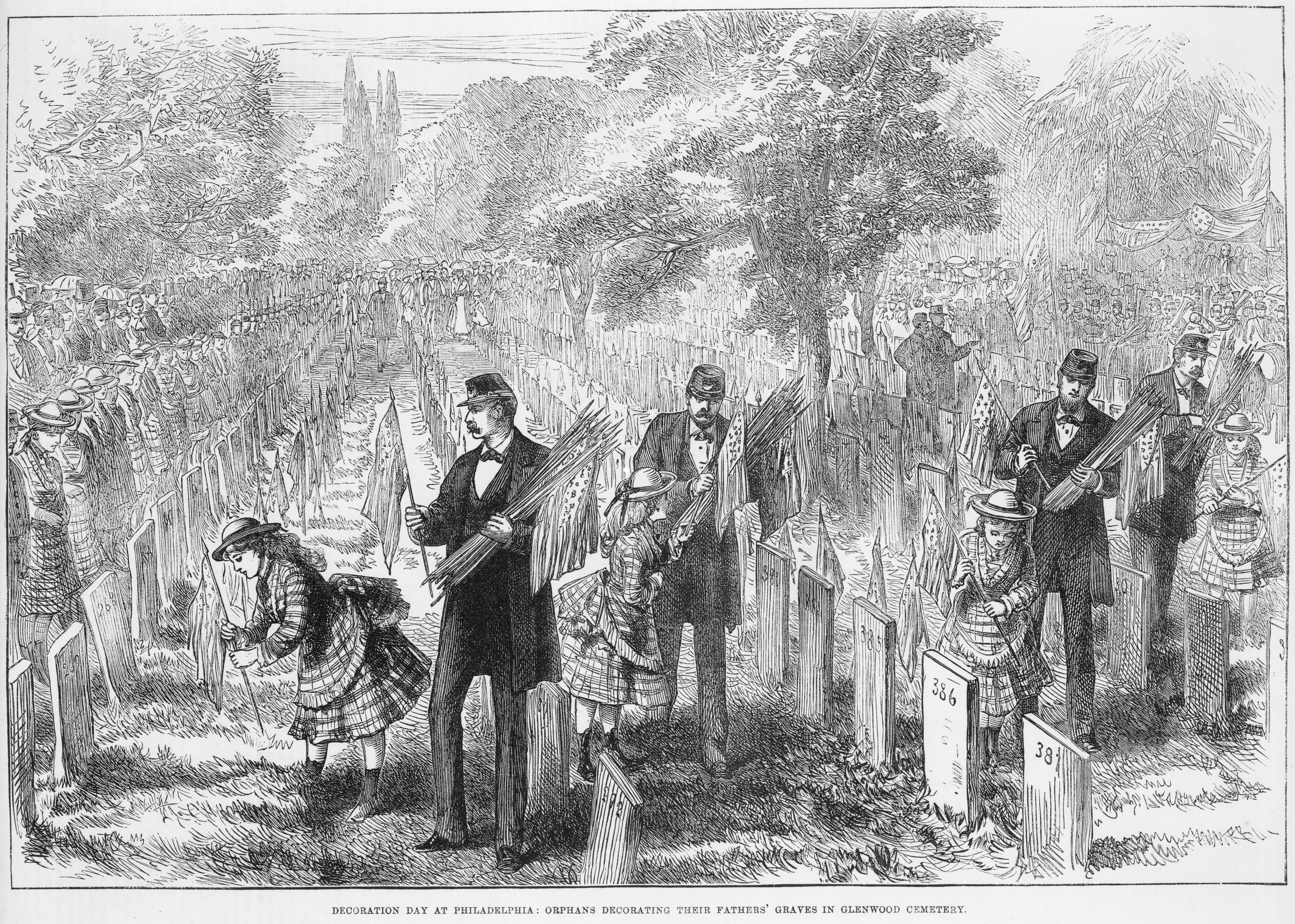
Orphans placing flags at their fathers' graves in Old Glenwood Cemetery on Decoration Day

Glenwood was part of the United States National Cemetery System during the American Civil War, with a leased lot within the cemetery for 702 Union soldiers who died in nearby hospitals. Several Confederate States Army soldiers who died as prisoners of war in local Philadelphia hospitals were also buried in the cemetery. After the Civil War, Memorial Day ceremonies at the cemetery included orphans placing flags at the graves of their fathers. The soldiers' remains were reinterred to the Philadelphia National Cemetery in 1891.

By the 1910s, the cemetery was mostly full and the surrounding city was rapidly expanding. The City of Philadelphia began to develop plans to build streets through parts of the cemetery. The cemetery was abandoned in the 1920s and fell into disrepair. The cemetery was regularly vandalized and local businesses and churches began to advocate for relocation of the cemetery. In 1921, the City of Philadelphia Health Department banned future interments in the graveyard.

The Barrymore family of stage and theatre owners had a family plot in Glenwood Cemetery but relocated it to Mount Vernon Cemetery in 1921 as Glenwood Cemetery declined.

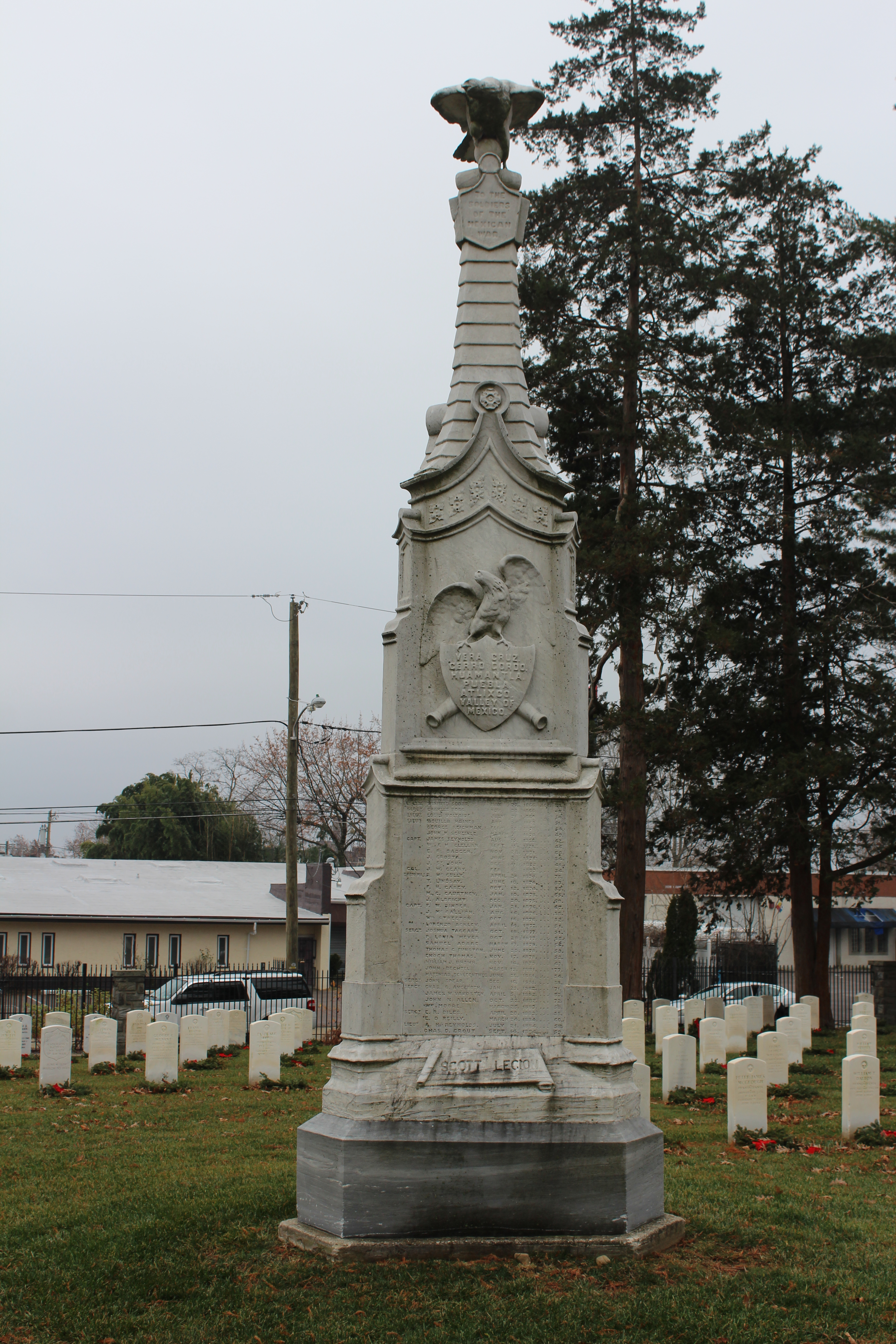
The Mexican-American War Memorial monument dedicated in the Old Glenwood Cemetery was relocated to the Philadelphia National Cemetery

169 soldiers who died in the Mexican-American War, were reinterred from Glenwood to the Philadelphia National Cemetery in 1927. The Mexican-American War monument was also relocated to the Philadelphia National Cemetery.

== New Glenwood cemetery ==
Glenwood Memorial Gardens was established in 1923 as New Glenwood Cemetery and the first burials took place in February 1924. The cemetery was built on 51 acres of farm land purchased from Eleanor F. Baker in 1921.

In 1938, the Old Glenwood Cemetery was condemned and taken by eminent domain by the City of Philadelphia. The cemetery was moved and over 20,000 bodies were reinterred to the New Glenwood Cemetery in Broomall. The vacated cemetery property in North Philadelphia, was purchased by the Philadelphia Housing Authority in 1938 for the construction of the James Weldon Johnson Homes public housing project.

The cemetery expanded to its current size of 70 acres after the World War II. and was renamed Glenwood Memorial Gardens. The expansion of the cemetery implemented a lawn cemetery style design with markers of bronze or stone flush with the ground. It is owned by Service Corporation International, the largest cemetery provider in the United States.

== Notable burials ==
- Maurice Barrymore (1849-1905), Stage actor and patriarch of the Barrymore family of actors
- Chauncey Bulkley (1798–1860), lawyer and politician
- Georgiana Drew (1856–1893), Stage actress and comedian
- John Drew Sr. (1827–1862), Stage actor and theatre manager
- Louisa Lane Drew (1820–1897), Stage actress and theatre manager
- Daniel Faulkner (1955–1981), Police officer murdered by Mumia Abu-Jamal
- John Gwinn (1791–1849), United States Navy Officer
- Edward Kern (1822–1863), Artist, topographer and explorer of California
- John A. Koltes (1823–1862), Union army officer
- Harvey MacDonald (1898–1965), Major League baseball player
- John Miller (1839–1882), Medal of Honor recipient
- John Newkumet (1827–1869), Union army officer
- Thomas Jones Rogers (1781–1832), U.S. Congressman
- Barney Slaughter (1884–1961), Major League baseball player
