= USS Petrel (PG-2) =

Gunboat of the United States Navy

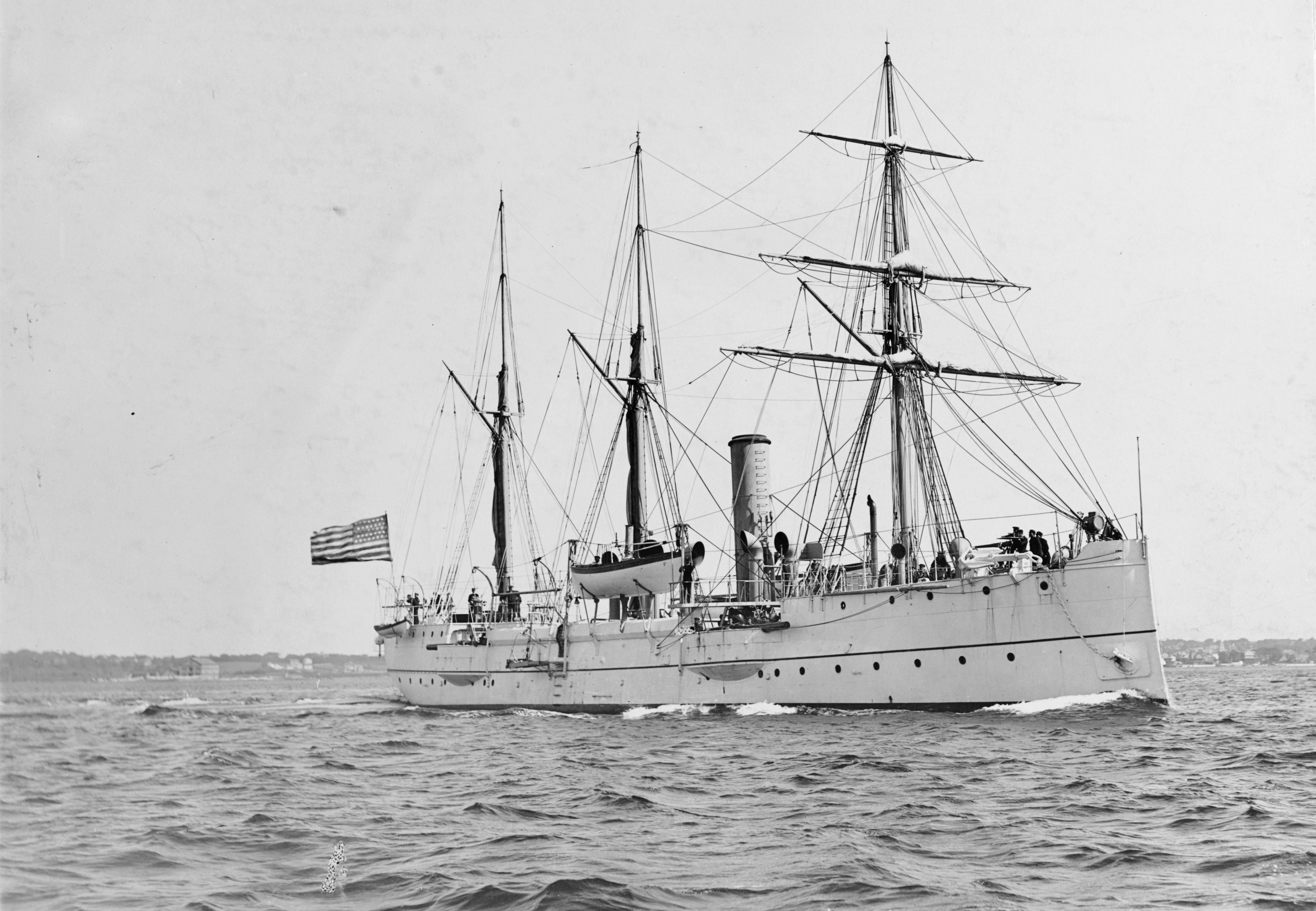
- USS Petrel

History

United States
- Laid down: 27 August 1887
- Launched: 13 October 1888
- Commissioned: 10 December 1889
- Decommissioned: 15 July 1919
- Stricken: 16 April 1920
- Home port: various
- Fate: Sold 1 November 1920

General characteristics
- Displacement: 867 tons
- Length: 188 ft (57 m)
- Beam: 31 ft (9.4 m)
- Draft: 11 ft 6 in (3.51 m)
- Speed: 11.4 kts
- Complement: 138
- Armament: 4 × 6 in (150 mm) cal guns; 2 × 3-pounder guns; 1 × 1-pounder gun

The third USS Petrel (PG-2) was a 4th rate gunboat in the United States Navy during the Spanish–American War. She was named for a sea bird.

Petrel was laid down on 27 August 1887, built by the Columbia Iron Works and Dry Dock Company in Baltimore, Maryland; launched on 13 October 1888; and commissioned 10 December 1889.

== Service in the Pacific ==
Assigned to the North Atlantic Station, Petrel continued with it until September 1891, when ordered to the Asiatic Squadron where she was to serve until 1911. Steaming north in May 1894, she reported at Unalaska, in July to operate with the Bering Sea patrol to discourage seal poaching. In July, she operated off the Pribilof Islands; and in August she returned to the Asiatic station.

In March and April 1898 Emilio Aguinaldo had meeting with Commander Edward Wood, captain of the Petrel to discuss Philippine rebel support in the upcoming Spanish–American War.

Withdrawing from Hong Kong in April 1898, Petrel became part of George Dewey's fleet in the campaign against Manila. On 1 May, after Dewey's squadron had defeated the heavy Spanish ships in the first engagement of the Spanish–American War, Petrel entered the inner harbor and lowered a boat to destroy six Spanish ships there. (For more detailed information, see Battle of Manila Bay.) Petrel then steamed to the navy yard at Cavite and forced its surrender. Sent into Cavite to destroy any Spanish ships seeking refuge there on 2 May, Petrel sent a party ashore which seized the arsenal at Cavite and returned with 2 tugs, Rapido and Hercules, plus 3 additional launches.

Petrel continued operations in the Philippines throughout 1898 and 1899. She joined USS Boston in shelling Panay Island on 11 February 1899; on the 22nd, a force of 48 men from Petrel occupied Cebu. In October, Petrel joined USS Callao in supporting the Marine Corps assault on Noveleta by bombarding ahead of the advancing Marine column.

=== 1901 fire ===
On the morning of 31 March 1901, while off Cavite in Manila Bay, Petrel suffered a fire which resulted in the death of her captain, Lieutenant Commander Jesse M. Roper. The fire originated in the sail room, a small compartment in the bottom of the ship, adjacent to the magazine and accessible only by a hatchway from the berth deck above. While some sailors cleared ammunition out of the magazine, another group, led by Roper, took turns entering the compartment and fighting the blaze. The fire produced no visible flames but thick, acrid smoke and fumes. The sail room was also pitch black; the ship's electric generator had been turned off at dawn, and no other lamps would work in the harsh atmosphere of the compartment. A number of men, including Roper, were overcome by the bad air and were pulled out of the sail room semi-conscious. As the fumes grew thicker and more noxious, Roper ordered everyone out of the compartment, but one sailor, Seaman Patrick Toner, did not emerge from the room.

When a sound was heard from below, believed to be Toner fighting for breath, four men descended to rescue him. The four were Roper (not fully recovered from his first trip below), Cadet J.E. Lewis, Jack of the Dust Kessler, and Gunner's Mate Flaherty. When the four men did not return, Seaman Alphonse Girandy tied a rope around his waist and climbed down the ladder. He found Kessler and Flaherty, both semi-conscious, and passed them up to be hauled through the hatchway. At the bottom of the ladder he found Toner and, although losing consciousness himself, held on to him as the sailors above pulled both men out of the compartment. Lieutenant J.S. McKean, with a rope around his waist, was next into the sail room, followed by Private Louis F. Theis of the ship's Marine Corps detachment and Seaman Thomas Cahey. As McKean searched in the darkness for the two men still missing, Lieutenant Commander Roper and Cadet Lewis, the ship's generator finally came back online. With the help of a lamp lowered through the hatchway, McKean could see Roper and Lewis slumped against the walls of the compartment. McKean dragged Roper to the ladder to be hauled out and then, with the help of Theis and Cahey, rescued Lewis just before losing consciousness himself. The fire was extinguished later that day; Roper was killed by the fumes, but the other men all eventually recovered. For their actions during the incident, Cahey, Girandy, and Thies were each awarded the Medal of Honor.

== Service in the Atlantic ==
Decommissioned at Cavite after the war, Petrel was recommissioned on 9 May 1910. After visiting European waters in 1911, she returned to the Atlantic coast. Disturbances in the Caribbean sent her to Mexican and West Indian waters from 1912 to 1915 to protect American interests, and in 1916 she became station ship at Guantanamo. With the World War I declaration of war in April, Petrel returned to the United States to serve with the American Patrol Detachment at Boston, Massachusetts, throughout the war.

During World War I Petrel became stranded on a South American island while hunting for submarines after the wireless communications were swept overboard during a storm. The natives helped the sailors find food and survive until they were able to get away on the tide.

After 30 years of service, Petrel was decommissioned at New Orleans, Louisiana, on 15 July 1919 and was struck from the Naval Vessel Register on 16 April 1920. She was subsequently sold to Snare and Treest, New York, on 1 November 1920.

== Awards ==
- Dewey Medal
- Spanish Campaign Medal
- Philippine Campaign Medal
- Mexican Service Medal
- Victory Medal with "PATROL" clasp
