= Dave Zearfoss =

American baseball player (1868–1945)

- Catcher
- Born: January 1, 1868; Schenectady, New York, U.S.
- Died: September 12, 1945 (aged 77); Wilmington, Delaware, U.S.
- Batted: Unknown Threw: Right

MLB debut
- April 17, 1896, for the New York Giants

Last MLB appearance
- July 8, 1905, for the St. Louis Cardinals

MLB statistics
- Batting average: .208
- Home runs: 0
- Runs batted in: 17
- Stats at Baseball Reference

Teams
- New York Giants (1896–1898); St. Louis Cardinals (1904–1905)

David William Tilden Zearfoss (January 1, 1868 – September 12, 1945) was an American professional baseball catcher. He played all or part of five seasons in Major League Baseball between 1896 and 1905 for the New York Giants and the St. Louis Cardinals. He had a .208 batting average for his major league career.

In 1908, he became the manager of a minor league team in Wilmington, Delaware and would become a resident of Delaware. He attended the University of Delaware and worked for thirty years for the Wilmington Gas Company until his retirement in 1939. He died in 1945 and was buried in Northwood Cemetery in Philadelphia.

== Sources ==
- Career statistics from Baseball Reference, or Baseball Reference (Minors)
