= Alphonse Girandy =

American Navy Medal of Honor recipient

- Born: January 21, 1868; Guadeloupe
- Died: April 3, 1941 (aged 73)
- Burial place: Philadelphia National Cemetery, Pennsylvania
- Military career
- Allegiance: United States of America
- Branch: United States Navy
- Rank: Seaman
- Unit: USS Petrel (PG-2)
- Awards: Medal of Honor

Alphonse Girandy (January 21, 1868 – April 3, 1941) was a United States Navy sailor and a recipient of America's highest military decoration, the Medal of Honor.

== Biography ==
Girandy, of Pennsylvania, joined the Navy and served during the Spanish–American War in 1898. On March 31, 1901, he was working as a Seaman on the USS Petrel (PG-2) when a fire broke out on the ship. For his actions on that occasion, Seaman Girandy was awarded the Medal of Honor one year later, on March 22, 1902. His official Medal of Honor citation reads: "Serving on board the U.S.S. Petrel, for heroism and gallantry, fearlessly exposing his own life to danger for the saving of others, on the occasion of the fire on board that vessel, March 31, 1901." He continued to serve in the Navy into World War I.

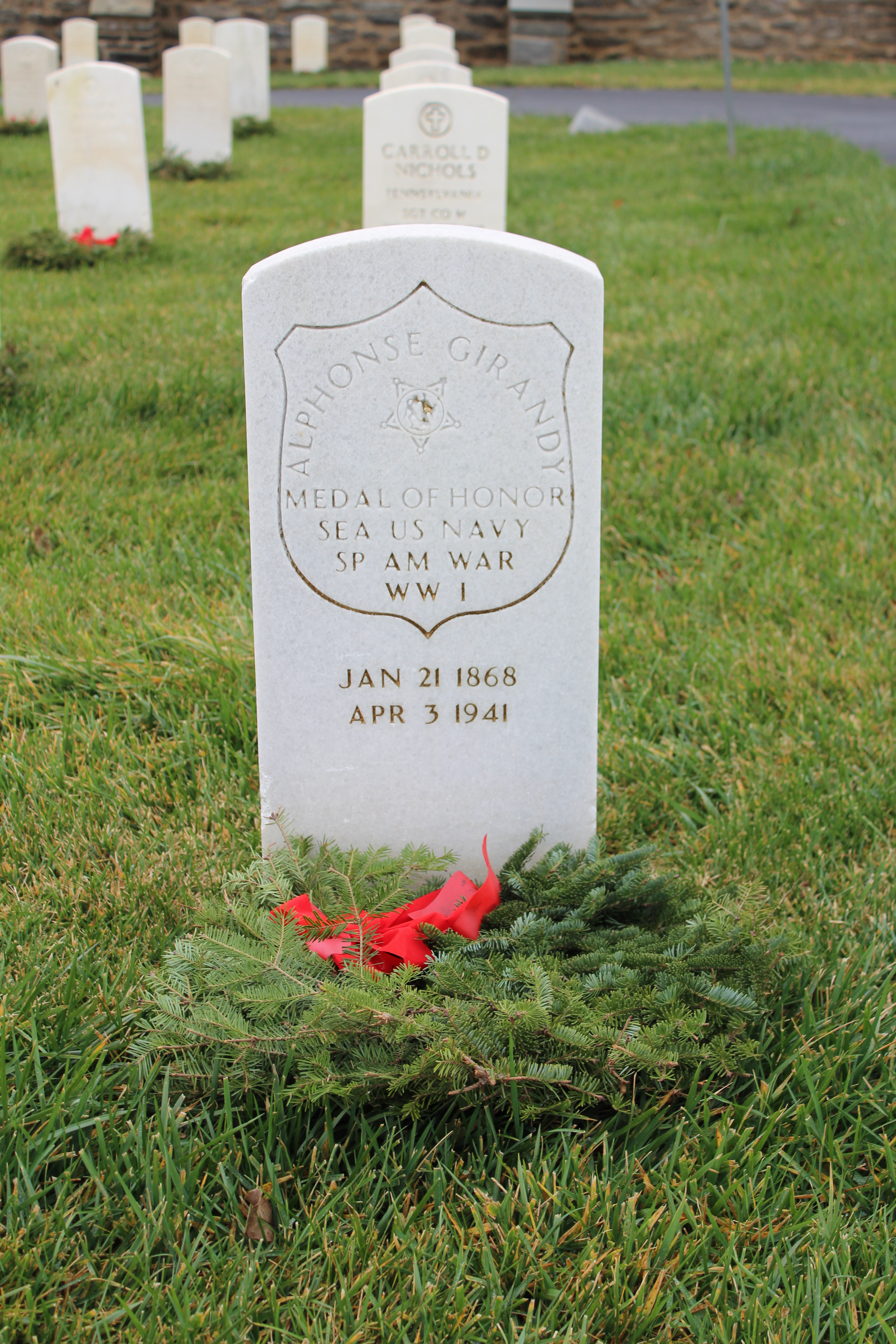
Alphonse Girandy tombstone in Philadelphia National Cemetery

Girandy died at age 73 and was buried in Philadelphia National Cemetery, Philadelphia, Pennsylvania.

== Awards ==
- Medal of Honor
- Good Conduct Medal
- Spanish Campaign Medal
- Philippine Campaign Medal
- World War I Victory Medal

=== Medal of Honor citation ===
Rank and organization: Seaman, U.S. Navy. Born: January 21, 1868, Guadeloupe, West Indies. Accredited to: Pennsylvania. G.O. No.: 85, March 22, 1902.

Citation:

Serving on board the U.S.S. Petrel, for heroism and gallantry, fearlessly exposing his own life to danger for the saving of others, on the occasion of the fire on board that vessel, March 31, 1901.

== See also ==
- List of Medal of Honor recipients during Peacetime
- List of African American Medal of Honor recipients
