= Jesse M. Roper =

United States Naval officer (1851 - 1901)

Jesse M. Roper (29 October 1851 – 31 March 1901) was an officer in the United States Navy during the Spanish–American War.

== Biography ==
Born at Glasgow, Missouri, Roper was appointed midshipman in June 1868 and graduated from the United States Naval Academy in 1872. Commissioned lieutenant commander in 1899, he assumed command of USS Petrel (PG-2) shortly thereafter. On 31 March 1901, while Petrel was moored at Cavite, Philippine Islands, fire broke out in the sail room, adjacent to the magazines. Lieutenant Commander Roper went down into the burning area twice to rescue trapped seamen. Lieutenant Commander Roper was overcome by smoke on his second descent and suffocated before help could reach him.

== Namesake ==
The destroyer USS Roper (DD-147) was named in his honor.
