= Thomas Cahey =

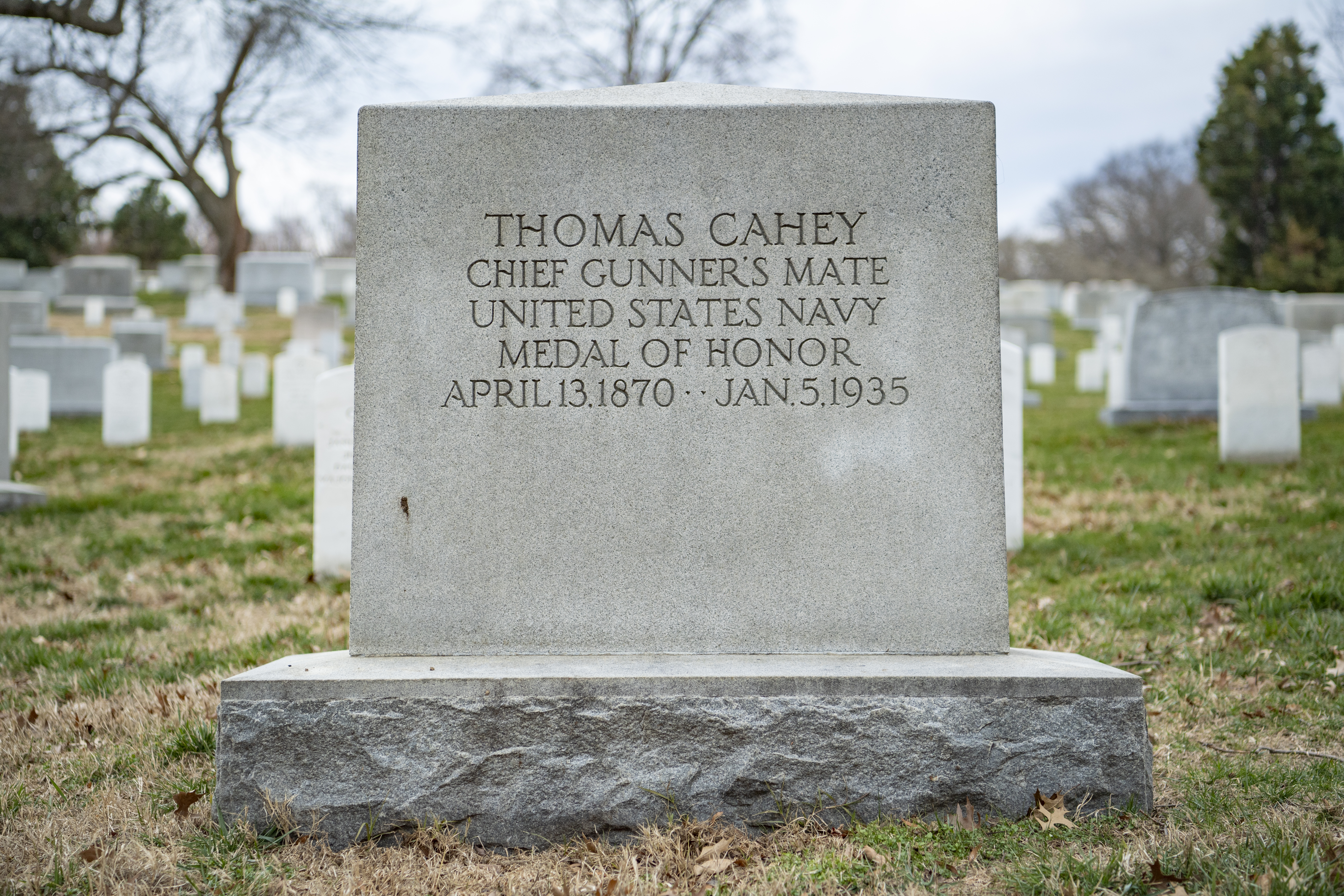
- Grave at Arlington National Cemetery, Section 6
- Born: April 13, 1870; Belfast, Ireland
- Died: January 5, 1935 (aged 64)
- Burial place: Arlington National Cemetery
- Military career
- Allegiance: United States
- Branch: United States Navy
- Rank: Chief Gunner's Mate
- Unit: USS Petrel (PG-2)
- Awards: Medal of Honor

Thomas Cahey (April 13, 1870 – January 5, 1935) was a United States Navy sailor who received the United States military's highest decoration, the Medal of Honor.

Born in Belfast, Ireland, on April 13, 1870, Cahey immigrated to the United States and joined the U.S. Navy from New York. By March 31, 1901, he was serving as a seaman on the USS Petrel (PG-2). On that day, he helped rescue several crewmates during a fire on the ship. For these actions, he was awarded the Medal of Honor a year later, on March 22, 1902.

Cahey's official Medal of Honor citation reads:

On board the U.S.S. Petrel for heroism and gallantry, fearlessly exposing his own life to danger in saving others on the occasion of the fire on board that vessel, 31 March 1901.

Cahey reached the rank of chief gunner's mate before leaving the Navy. He died at age 64 and was buried at Arlington National Cemetery in Arlington County, Virginia.

== See also ==
- List of Medal of Honor recipients
