= Chauncey Bulkley =

American lawyer (1798–1860)

- Born: January 16, 1798; Wethersfield, Connecticut, U.S.
- Died: May 23, 1860 (aged 62); Philadelphia, Pennsylvania, U.S.
- Resting place: Glenwood Cemetery; Philadelphia, Pennsylvania, U.S.
- Occupations: Lawyer; educator; businessman; politician
- Relatives: Peter Bulkley

Chauncey Bulkley (January 16, 1798 – May 23, 1860) was an American lawyer, educator, businessman, and politician from Philadelphia.

== Early life and education ==
Chauncey Bulkley was born on January 16, 1798, in Wethersfield, Connecticut, to Francis Bulkley. He was descended from reverend Peter Bulkley of Concord, Massachusetts. He graduated from Yale University in 1817. Later in Philadelphia, he studied law with Charles Chauncey and was admitted to the bar on May 20, 1822.

== Career ==
Following graduation, Bulkley taught school in Philadelphia for about a year. He then taught at Mount Airy College in Germantown, Philadelphia for three years. After being admitted to the bar, he practiced law in Philadelphia. From 1832 to 1833, he was secretary and treasurer of the Germantown and Norristown Railroad Company. From 1845 to 1850, he was an alderman of Philadelphia. He continued practicing law until his death.

== Personal life ==
Bulkley died on May 23, 1860, in Philadelphia. He was buried in Glenwood Cemetery.
