= Larry Holmes vs. Renaldo Snipes =

Imminent Danger
- Date: November 6, 1981
- Venue: Civic Arena, Pittsburgh, Pennsylvania, U.S.
- Title(s) on the line: WBC and The Ring heavyweight titles

Tale of the tape
Boxer	Larry Holmes	Renaldo Snipes
Nickname	The Easton Assassin	Mr. Snipes
Hometown	Easton, Pennsylvania, U.S.	Yonkers, New York, U.S.
Purse	$1,000,000	$175,000
Pre-fight record	38–0 (28 KO)	22–0 (11 KO)
Age	32 years	25 years, 2 months
Height	6 ft 3 in (191 cm)	6 ft 2 1/2 in (189 cm)
Weight	213 1/4 lb (97 kg)	215 3/4 lb (98 kg)
Style	Orthodox	Orthodox
Recognition	WBC and The Ring; Heavyweight Champion	WBC; No. 8 Ranked Heavyweight

Result
- Holmes wins via 11th-round technical knockout

Larry Holmes vs. Renaldo Snipes, billed as Imminent Danger, was a professional boxing match contested on November 6, 1981, for the WBC and The Ring heavyweight titles.

== Background ==
In late August 1981, it was announced that WBC heavyweight champion Larry Holmes would make his next title defense against little-known fringe contender Renaldo Snipes. Snipes, who was the WBC's 11th-ranked heavyweight contender at the time of the fight's announcement but then upgraded to eighth-ranked position come the night of the fight, had risen to contention after going defeating then-WBA light heavyweight champion Eddie Mustafa Muhammad and heavyweight contender Gerrie Coetzee in consecutive fights. Just over a week after his title defense against Snipes was set, Holmes' long-awaited defense against top-ranked contender Gerry Cooney was announced to be taking place the following March (later postponed until June), overshadowing his title defense against Snipes, which was now looked at as nothing but a tune-up for Holmes. Holmes refused to downgrade his fight with Snipes, stating that he was "going into this fight like all my other fights, to win."

The bout was held in Pittsburgh, Pennsylvania's Civic Arena, Holmes' first professional fight in his native state. Promoter Don King, feeling that Holmes was taking an unnecessary risk by facing Snipes despite having signed on for a big money fight with Cooney, billed the fight as Imminent Danger.

== Fight details ==
Despite his status as a massive underdog, Snipes proved to be a tougher opponent than expected, though Holmes controlled most of the fight using his powerful left jab and eventually opened a cut above Snipes' left eye in the fifth round. However, early in the seventh round, Snipes caught Holmes flush with an overhand right that sent Holmes down to the canvas. Holmes quickly got back up but was clearly dazed from the blow and crashed into a neutral corner turnbuckle before taking referee Rudy Ortega's standing eight count and continuing with the fight. Immediately after Holmes was allowed to continue, Snipes charged across the ring and went on the attack in hopes of knocking out the still dazed Holmes, but Holmes was able to withstand Snipes' punches, recovered his senses and survived the round. From the ninth round on, Holmes regained control of the fight and 45 seconds into the 11th, caught Snipes with a right hand that staggered him. Pinning Snipes in the corner, Holmes landed three consecutive right hands to Snipes' head before Ortega stepped in and stopped the fight, giving Holmes the victory by technical knockout.

== Aftermath ==
Both Snipes and his manager Nick Rettini protested Ortega's decision to stop the fight. Snipes, who was not knocked down in the fight, angrily commented in a post-fight interview "no way they should have stopped the fight. It's not right, it's not right. I had the man knocked out. When I hurt him why didn't they stop the fight? I could be the champion of the world. I had this man. They stop it when he hits me with a good shot and what happened when I hit him? It's not right."

Meanwhile, while Holmes was being interviewed in the ring by commentator Howard Cosell, Rettini was involved in altercation with Holmes' brother Jake, which caused a melee in which Snipes went after Holmes. Snipes would then be accidently cut by a pair of scissors held by his trainer Fred Spry, opening up a two-inch cut laceration on his left forearm that would send him to the hospital and require 40 stitches to close.

== Fight card ==
Confirmed bouts:

Weight Class	Weight		vs.		Method	Round	Notes
Heavyweight	200+ lbs.	Larry Holmes (c)	def.	Renaldo Snipes	TKO	11/15	^{note 1}
Heavyweight	200+ lbs.	Michael Dokes	def.	George Chaplin	UD	10
Heavyweight	200+ lbs.	Randall Cobb	def.	Bernardo Mercado	UD	10
Heavyweight	200+ lbs.	Jimmy Young	def.	Milton Seward	UD	10
Welterweight	147 lbs.	Bobby Joe Young	def.	Mike Blunt	TKO	2/10
Heavyweight	200+ lbs.	David Bey	def.	James Douglas	TKO	2/4
Light Middleweight	154 lbs.	Carlton Haywood	def.	Ricardo Bryant	SD	4

^Note 1 For WBC and The Ring Heavyweight Titles

== Broadcasting ==
Country	Broadcaster
United States	ABC

Preceded by vs. Leon Spinks	Larry Holmes's bouts November 6, 1981	Succeeded by vs. Gerry Cooney
Preceded by vs. Gerrie Coetzee	Trevor Berbick's bouts November 6, 1981	Succeeded by vs. Scott Frank
