= Greg Page vs. Tim Witherspoon =

Boxing match

True Vindication
- Date: March 9, 1984
- Venue: Las Vegas Convention Center, Las Vegas, Nevada
- Title(s) on the line: WBC heavyweight title

Tale of the tape
Boxer	Greg Page	Tim Witherspoon
Nickname		Terrible
Hometown	Louisville, Kentucky	Philadelphia, Pennsylvania
Purse	$400,000	$250,000
Pre-fight record	23–1 (18 KO)	17–1 (12 KO)
Age	25 years, 4 months	26 years, 2 months
Height	6 ft 2 in (188 cm)	6 ft 3 1/2 in (192 cm)
Weight	239 1/2 lb (109 kg)	220 1/4 lb (100 kg)
Style	Orthodox	Orthodox
Recognition	WBC; No. 1 Ranked Heavyweight; The Ring; No. 2 Ranked Heavyweight; USBA heavyweight champion	WBC; No. 2 Ranked Heavyweight; The Ring; No. 5 Ranked Heavyweight; NABF heavyweight champion

Result
- Witherspoon wins via MD (117–111, 117–111, 114–114)

Greg Page vs. Tim Witherspoon, billed as True Vindication, was a professional boxing match contested on March 9, 1984, for the vacant WBC heavyweight title.

== Background ==
Greg Page had become the number-one ranked heavyweight contender after defeating fellow contender Renaldo Snipes on May 20, 1983. The victory put Page in line for a title shot against the winner of the fight between reigning WBC heavyweight champion Larry Holmes and challenger Tim Witherspoon. After Holmes narrowly defeated Witherspoon by split decision, the WBC ordered Holmes to make his next defense against Page, his mandatory challenger or risk being stripped of his title. Holmes, disappointed by the $2.5 million purse he was being offered to fight Page, opted to take a more lucrative fight with Marvis Frazier which would pay him $3.1 million. WBC president José Sulaimán reiterated that Holmes would be stripped of his title should he chose to fight Frazier instead of Page confirming that Holmes had signed a WBC contract with promoter Don King to fight Page and expected Holmes to respect the contracts terms. Days later Sulaimán had a change of heart and decided against stripping Holmes, but refused to sanction his fight against Frazier as Frazier was not among the WBC's top-10 contenders. Holmes then opted to make a title defense against Scott Frank before facing Frazier stating he would "get around to Page" after the holidays if the "deal was right".

With Holmes not keen to fight him, Page was forced to take a tune-up fight against Rick Kellar in lieu of a heavyweight title bout for which he expressed frustration telling the media "I'm the No. 1 contender. I'm supposed to be the one Larry's reckoning with. But that No. 1 don't mean a thing. It's just a number." He also expressed doubt that Holmes would ever agree to fight him saying it was like Holmes was saying "To hell with him, let's keep him in the wings." After defeating both Frank and Frazier, Holmes was still unable to come to terms with Page and on December 11, 1983, officially relinquished the WBC heavyweight title in favor of recognition from the newly-formed IBF. That same day the WBC announced that the still number-one ranked Page and the number-two ranked Witherspoon would meet for the now-vacant WBC heavyweight title. Having waited for a title opportunity for the better part of a year, Page expressed both excitement and disappointment stating that while the title shot was "something I waited for for a long time" he "would've liked to face Larry." After the fight was officially announced in early February, both Page, who entered the fight as 7–5 favorite, and Witherspoon bashed Holmes in the press. Page labeled Holmes a "chicken" while Witherspoon, whom had been defeated by Holmes the previous year and had hoped for a rematch, shared Page's sentiments stating "The I.B.F., that ain't nothing. Holmes is running. He's supposed to be fighting Greg Page and give me a return match. How you gonna get a lot of respect running?"

== The fight ==
The two fighters fought a relatively close but lackluster fight and appeared sluggish as the fight went on leading to crowd to boo the lack of action, though Witherspoon served as the aggressor throughout and did just enough to earn a majority decision victory. One judge scored the fight a draw at 114–114 while the two other judges scored the fight at 117–111. The Associated Press scored it 116–112 for Witherspoon.

== Aftermath ==
Witherspoon admitted having trouble with Page stating after the fight "I knew if I could get him in the center of the ring, I knew I could knock him out, but he wouldn't let me. Page, meanwhile, was so upset about his loss that he contemplated retirement saying "This is my retirement, man. I'm through with it. It's not worth it."

Holmes, now the IBF heavyweight champion, attended the fight as did then-WBA heavyweight champion Gerrie Coetzee. Holmes criticized the performance of both men telling media "I always told you neither of them could fight." When asked by someone at ringside who was ahead in the fight he jokingly answered "Where's there a fight?"

== Fight card ==
Confirmed bouts:

Weight Class	Weight		vs.		Method	Round	Notes
Heavyweight	200+ lbs.	Tim Witherspoon	def	Greg Page	MD	12/12	^{Note 1}
Cruiserweight	190 lbs.	Carlos De León (c)	def.	Anthony Davis	UD	12/12	^{Note 2}
Featherweight	126 lbs.	Azumah Nelson	def.	Hector Cortez	UD	10/10
Heavyweight	200+ lbs.	David Bey	def.	Leroy Caldwell	UD	10/10

^Note 1 For WBC heavyweight title
^Note 2 For WBC and The Ring cruiserweight titles

== Broadcasting ==
Country	Broadcaster
Australia	Seven Network
Canada	Superchannel
Mexico	Televisa
Philippines	MBS 4
United Kingdom	BBC
United States	HBO

Preceded by vs. Rick Kellar	Greg Page's bouts 9 March 1984	Succeeded by vs. David Bey
Preceded by vs. James Tillis	Tim Witherspoon's bouts 9 March 1984	Succeeded by vs. Pinklon Thomas
