= Larry Holmes vs. Leon Spinks =

Boxing match

A Tribute to Joe Louis
- Date: June 12, 1981
- Venue: Joe Louis Arena, Detroit, Michigan
- Title(s) on the line: WBC and The Ring heavyweight titles

Tale of the tape
| Boxer | Larry Holmes | Leon Spinks |
| Nickname | The Easton Assassin | Neon |
| Hometown | Easton, Pennsylvania | St. Louis, Missouri |
| Purse | $1,900,000 | $490,000 |
| Pre-fight record | 37–0 (27 KO) | 10–2–2 (7 KO) |
| Age | 31 years, 7 months | 27 years, 11 months |
| Height | 6 ft 3 in (191 cm) | 6 ft 1 in (185 cm) |
| Weight | 212 1/2 lb (96 kg) | 200 1/4 lb (91 kg) |
| Style | Orthodox | Orthodox |
| Recognition | WBC and The Ring; Heavyweight Champion | WBC; No. 2 Ranked Heavyweight; The Ring; No. 3 Ranked Heavyweight; Former undisputed heavyweight champion |

Result
- Holmes wins via 3rd-round technical knockout

Larry Holmes vs. Leon Spinks, billed as A Tribute to Joe Louis, was a professional boxing match contested on June 12, 1981, for the WBC and The Ring heavyweight championship.

== Background ==
Promoter Don King had hoped to pit reigning WBC heavyweight champion Larry Holmes against former undisputed heavyweight shortly after Holmes' lopsided victory over an aging Muhammad Ali, announcing his plans in a press conference in late November 1980. The WBC, however, recognized Gerry Cooney as their top ranked contender and chose not to elevate Spinks in their rankings to replace Cooney, temporarily delaying the fight. With Holmes and Cooney unable to come to terms, Holmes was instead matched up against Trevor Berbick, with King stating he was still working on a Holmes–Spinks title fight as a follow-up for Holmes should he defeat Berbick. After Holmes defeated Berbick on April 11, 1981, his defense against Spinks was set. Originally the fight was to take place in Caesars Palace in the Las Vegas Valley on May 22, where seven of Holmes' ten title fights had taken place, however, the fight was moved back to June 12 and the venue switched to Detroit after it was reported that both fighters wanted more time to prepare. King decided to belatedly dedicate the fight to the memory of Joe Louis, the great former heavyweight champion from Detroit, whom had died two months earlier after attending the Holmes–Berbick fight, with the fight taking place in his namesake arena. Holmes was a 4 to 1 favorite going into the bout.

This was the first heavyweight title bout in Detroit since November 1970, when Joe Frazier knocked out light heavyweight champion Bob Foster in the second round at the Cobo Arena.

== The fight ==
As the fight began, Spinks went at Holmes aggressively, though Holmes used his trademark left jab to keep Spinks at bay and easily won the round. In the second, Holmes was still in control of the fight when the bell was accidentally rang 25 seconds before the round ended, leading to confusion as Holmes, thinking the round was over, dropped his hands momentarily, allowing Spinks to land a big right before the round officially ended. Holmes, seemingly angered by the mishap, dominated Spinks in the third round, backing him against the ropes and then landing several right hands that sent Spinks stumbling across the canvas, into the ropes and then onto the canvas. Spinks barely answered the referee's count at nine and was allowed to continue but Holmes quickly trapped the clearly hurt Spinks in the corner and continued to land punishing blows. Spinks' younger brother Michael, who was in Leon's corner, attempted to enter the ring to stop the fight but was restrained from doing so, while assistant trainer Dale Williams threw a white towel into the ring to signify surrender, though referee Richard Steele had already stepped in to end the fight. Holmes was declared the winner by technical knockout at 2:34 of the round.

== Aftermath ==
This was Spinks's last heavyweight bout for some years, as he moved down in weight to box in the cruiserweight division.

== Fight card ==
Confirmed bouts:

| Weight Class | Weight | | vs. | | Method | Round | Notes |
|---|---|---|---|---|---|---|---|
| Heavyweight | 200+ lbs. | Larry Holmes (c) | def | Leon Spinks | TKO | 3/15 | ^{Note 1} |
| Lightweight | 135 lbs. | Saoul Mamby (c) | def. | Jo Kimpuani | UD | 15/15 | ^{Note 2} |
| Heavyweight | 200+ lbs. | Greg Page | def. | Alfredo Evangelista | KO | 2/10 |
| Heavyweight | 200+ lbs. | Michael Dokes | def. | John L. Gardner | KO | 4/10 |

^Note 1 For WBC heavyweight title
^Note 2 For WBC lightweight title

== Broadcasting ==
| Country | Broadcaster |
|---|---|
| United Kingdom | ITV |
| United States | ABC |

| Preceded by vs. Trevor Berbick | Larry Holmes's bouts 12 June 1981 | Succeeded by vs. Renaldo Snipes |
| Preceded by vs. Bernardo Mercado | Leon Spinks's bouts 12 June 1981 | Succeeded by vs. Ivy Brown |
