= Muhammad Ali vs. Trevor Berbick =

Boxing match

Drama in Bahama
- Date: 11 December 1981
- Venue: Queen Elizabeth Sports Centre, Nassau, Bahamas

Tale of the tape
Boxer	Muhammad Ali	Trevor Berbick
Nickname	"The Greatest"	
Hometown	Louisville, Kentucky, U.S.	Norwich, Port Antonio, Jamaica
Purse	$1,100,000	$350,000
Pre-fight record	56–4 (37 KO)	19–2–1 (17 KO)
Age	39 years, 10 months	27 years, 4 months
Height	6 ft 3 in (191 cm)	6 ft 2 in (188 cm)
Weight	236 lb (107 kg)	218 lb (99 kg)
Style	Orthodox	Orthodox
Recognition	Former Three-times undisputed heavyweight champion	WBA/WBC; No. 4 Ranked Heavyweight; The Ring; No. 7 Ranked Heavyweight; Canadian and Commonwealth heavyweight champion

Result
- Berbick wins by unanimous decision in 10 rounds (99–94, 99–94, 97–94)

Muhammad Ali vs. Trevor Berbick, billed as "Drama in Bahama", was a ten-round professional boxing match that took place in Nassau, Bahamas on 11 December 1981.

The fight went the distance with Berbick winning through a unanimous decision on points. This was Ali's last boxing match.

== Background ==
Prior to the fight, Ali claimed that he had been declared fit by "even the best white doctors." Nevertheless, the venue for the fight—Nassau in the Bahamas—was chosen because no American state would grant Ali a boxing license after his performance in the match with Larry Holmes.

The promoter of this fight was James Cornelius, a convicted felon with links to the Nation of Islam. However, a problem arose since Don King had signed up Berbick for a three-fight deal. When King arrived in Nassau to demand his share of the profits from this fight, he was greeted by two friends of Cornelius who administered a sound beating to King.

Ali had hoped to use this fight to earn a title bid against Mike Weaver the World Boxing Association Champ. Ali said "The stage is set for me. I love this sort of situation".

Ali's weight just before and during the fight was 236 pounds (107 kilograms). One reporter described him as Michelin Man. Ticket sales for the fight were so slow that the promoters ended up offering them at a heavily discounted price. Ultimately, fewer than 7,500 people witnessed this fight. There was no pay-per-view television; no American network had even made a bid. However, ONTV aired the fight, with it airing at least in Cincinnati, Ohio.

The fight took place in the unfinished Queen Elizabeth Sports Centre. When people arrived to see the fight they found they could not get in because the key to the main gate had been misplaced. When the key was found, it was discovered that there were no boxing gloves at the venue. There was also no bell to signal the end of a round; ultimately a hastily procured cowbell had to be used for this purpose. Because of the paucity of paying spectators Berbick refused to fight unless he was paid upfront. The fight started more than two hours behind schedule.

== The fight ==
In the early rounds, Ali tried putting together some combinations, but these proved ineffectual and he was pushed back on the ropes. In the fifth round, Ali landed some solid jabs and then a right-left-right combination on Berbick, but by the sixth round Ali got tired and started getting hit. By the last round, Ali was completely exhausted. Sportswriter Hugh McIlvanney, who witnessed the fight, wrote:

Berbick is the kind of lumbering, slow-armed swinger [Ali] would have first embarrassed and then demolished in his dazzling prime...To see [Ali] lose to such a moderate fighter in such a grubby context was like watching a king riding into permanent exile on the back of a garbage truck. The one blessing was that he was steadily exhausted rather than violently hurt by the experience.

== Aftermath ==
Muhammad Ali said after the bout: "I think I'm too old. I was slow. I was weak. Nothing but Father Time. The things I wanted to do, I couldn't do. I was doing my best. I did good for a 39-year-old. I think I'm finished. I know it's the end. I'm not crazy. After Holmes, I had excuses. I was too light. Didn't breathe right. No excuses this time. I'm happy. I'm still pretty. I could have a black eye. Broken teeth. Split lips. I think I came out all right for an old man."

== Undercard ==
Confirmed bouts:

Winner	Loser	Weight division/title belt(s) disputed	Result
(United States) Greg Page	(United States) Scott LeDoux	USBA Heavyweight Title	4th-round TKO.
(United States) Thomas Hearns	(United States) Ernie Singletary	Super Welterweight (10 rounds)	Unanimous decision.
(United States) Earnie Shavers	(United States) Jeff Sims	Heavyweight (10 rounds)	5th-round KO.
(United States) Eddie Mustafa Muhammad	(United States) Michael Hardin	Heavyweight (10 rounds)	8th-round TKO.

== Broadcasting ==
Country	Broadcaster
Mexico	Televisa
Philippines	MBS 4
United Kingdom	ITV
United States	ONTV

Preceded by vs. Larry Holmes	Muhammad Ali's bouts 11 December 1981	Retired
Preceded by vs. Conroy Nelson	Trevor Berbick's bouts 11 December 1981	Succeeded by vs. Chuck Gardner
