= Alfredo Evangelista =

Uruguayan boxer (born 1954)

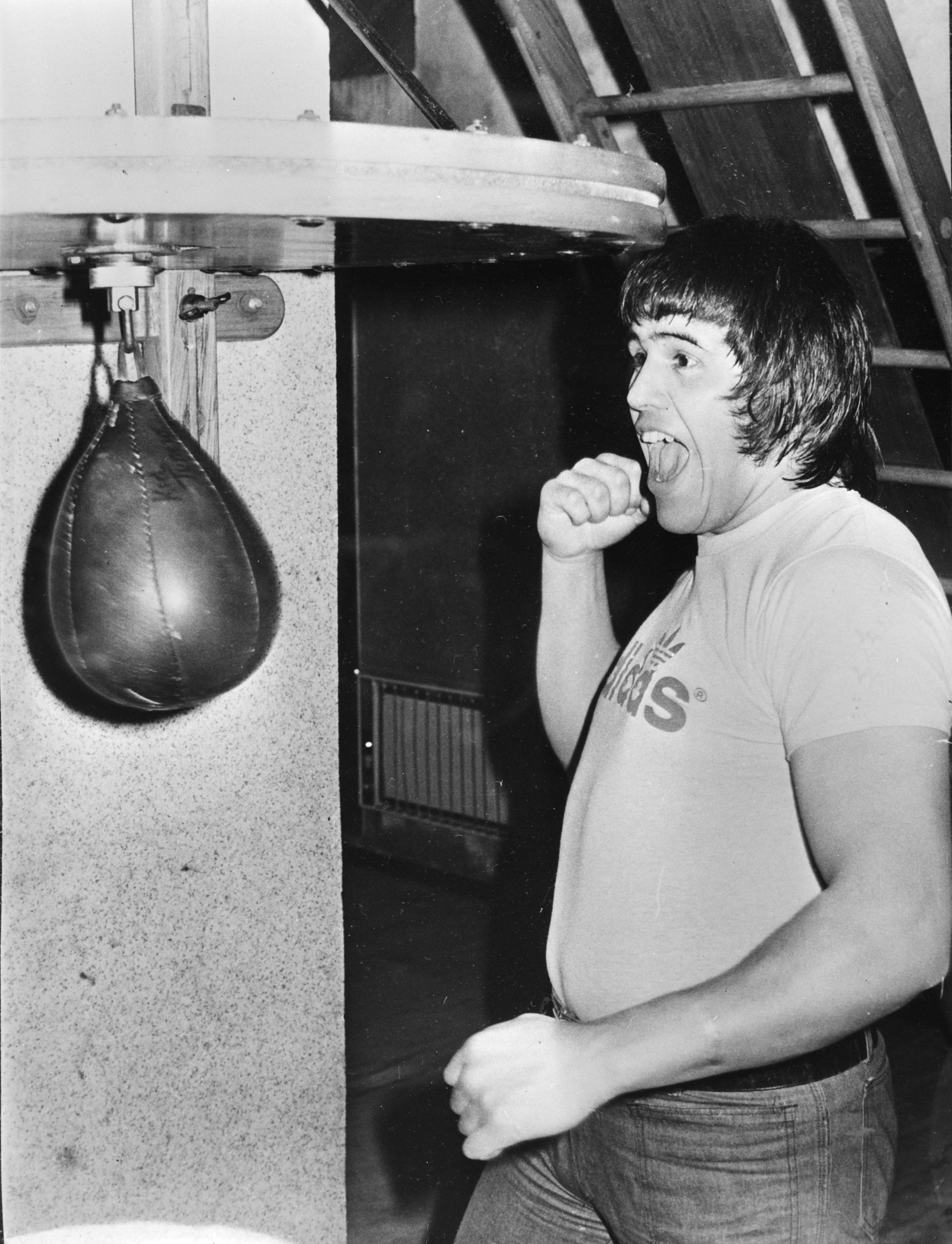
- Evangelista in 1977

Personal information
- Born: Alfredo Evangelista; December 3, 1954 (age 71) Montevideo, Uruguay
- Height: 6 ft 1 in (1.85 m)
- Weight: Heavyweight

Boxing career
- Stance: Orthodox

Boxing record
- Total fights: 79
- Wins: 62
- Win by KO: 43
- Losses: 13
- Draws: 4

Alfredo Evangelista (born December 3, 1954) is a Uruguayan former professional boxer.

== Boxing career ==
Evangelista started his career in 1975. He went undefeated in his first fifteen fights, One being a draw. In his sixteenth fight he was defeated by European Champion Lorenzo Zanon, and after the fight he was matched up with Muhammad Ali in a bout for the world heavyweight championship, losing by unanimous decision after 15 rounds.

After these fights he had nine straight victories. He then fought against Larry Holmes for the World Boxing Council title in 1978, and lost by knockout in the seventh round. Evangelista followed this up by three wins and a loss to Lorenzo Zanon in their rematch. He drew with Felipe Rodriguez.

He won seven fights before meeting and losing to Leon Spinks. He won six more, then drew with Felipe in their second fight. He took two wins before getting bested by Greg Page. Evangelista had a six-fight streak of no losses, with five wins and one draw piled in there. This streak ended at the hands of Lucien Rodriguez. He won four fights until Hughroy Currie overcame him. Evangelista then had a win streak of eight before getting beaten by Steffen Tangstad. Patrick Lumumba bested him after Evangelista pulled off two more wins. He won a fight before three straight losses, and after another win retired.

For the majority of his 13-year career, he was a journeyman who generally had streaks of wins followed by a couple of losses.

== Professional boxing record ==
79 fights	62 wins	13 losses
By knockout	43	4
By decision	17	9
By disqualification	2	0
Draws	4	

Result	Record	Opponent	Type	Round, time	Date	Location	Notes
Win	62–13–4	(United States) Arthur Wright	KO	2	15/04/1988	(Spain) Madrid	
Loss	61–13–4	(Brazil) Adilson Rodrigues	PTS	10	20/12/1987	(Brazil) Rio de Janeiro	
Loss	61–12–4	(South Africa) Pierre Coetzer	PTS	10	30/08/1987	Ellis Park Stadium, Johannesburg, South Africa	
Loss	61–11–4	(Sweden) Anders Eklund	KO	7	28/03/1987	(Denmark) K.B. Hallen, Copenhagen	European heavyweight title.
Win	61–10–4	(Netherlands) Andre van den Oetelaar	TKO	5	08/01/1987	(Spain) Bilbao	European heavyweight title.
Loss	60–10–4	(Kenya) Patrick Lumumba	PTS	8	05/09/1986	(Spain) Madrid	
Win	60–9–4	(United States) Tim Miller	KO	4	25/04/1986	(Spain) Benavente, Zamora	
Win	59–9–4	(Spain) Frank Vega	KO	1	15/03/1986	(Spain) Santa Cruz de Tenerife	
Loss	58–9–4	(Norway) Steffen Tangstad	PTS	8	10/01/1986	(Denmark) Randers Hallen, Randers	
Win	58–8–4	(Cameroon) Louis Pergaud Ngatchou	PTS	8	19/11/1985	(Spain) Barcelona	
Win	57–8–4	(United States) James Dixon	SD	10	07/07/1985	(United States) Riviera Las Vegas, Las Vegas	
Win	56–8–4	(United States) Marty Capasso	PTS	10	07/06/1985	Oranjestad, Aruba	
Win	55–8–4	(United States) Tony Velasco	DQ	5	10/05/1985	(United States) Galt Ocean Mile Hotel, Fort Lauderdale, Florida	Velasco disqualified at 2:48 of the fifth round.
Win	54–8–4	(United States) Tim Miller	TKO	3	29/03/1985	(The Bahamas) Nassau, Bahamas	
Win	53–8–4	(United States) Sterling Benjamin	TKO	9	01/03/1985	(Trinidad and Tobago) Jean Pierre Sports Complex, Port of Spain	Referee stopped the bout at 2:32 of the ninth round.
Win	52–8–4	(United States) Arthur Wright	TKO	2	05/01/1985	(Spain) Badajoz	
Win	51–8–4	(Cameroon) Louis Persaud Ngatchou	PTS	8	13/07/1984	(Balearic Islands) Palma de Mallorca	
Loss	50–8–4	(United Kingdom) Hughroy Currie	PTS	8	06/04/1984	(Spain) Bilbao	
Win	50–7–4	(United States) Renaldo Snipes	SD	10	23/09/1983	(United States) Richfield Coliseum, Richfield, Ohio	
Win	49–7–4	(United States) Larry Ware	KO	2	17/07/1983	(United States) The Dunes, Las Vegas	
Win	48–7–4	(Spain) Victor Varon	PTS	8	19/12/1982	(Spain) Salamanca	
Win	47–7–4	(Spain) Victor Varon	PTS	8	28/08/1982	(Spain) Puente Genil	
Loss	46–7–4	(France) Lucien Rodriguez	PTS	12	07/06/1982	(France) Paris	European heavyweight title.
Win	46–6–4	(Zaire) Ali Lukasa	TKO	6	29/04/1982	(Spain) Barcelona	
Draw	45–6–4	(United Kingdom) Terry O'Connor	PTS	8	23/10/1981	(Spain) Madrid	
Win	45–6–3	(Saint Kitts and Nevis) Terry Mintus	KO	3	12/09/1981	(Spain) Oviedo	
Win	44–6–3	(United States) Terry Daniels	KO	2	29/08/1981	(Balearic Islands) Ibiza	
Win	43–6–3	(United States) Tom Prater	RTD	4	01/08/1981	(Spain) La Linea de la Concepción	
Win	42–6–3	(Mali) Mary Konate	KO	3	18/07/1981	(Spain) Pontevedra	
Loss	41–6–3	(United States) Greg Page	KO	2	Jun 12, 1981	(United States) Joe Louis Arena, Detroit	Alfredo knocked out at 0:40 of the second round.
Win	41–5–3	(United States) Henry Patterson	KO	1	09/05/1981	(Spain) Guadalajara, Castile-La Mancha	
Win	40–5–3	(United States) Henry Patterson	PTS	8	21/03/1981	(Spain) Zaragoza	
Draw	39–5–3	(Spain) Felipe Rodriquez Piñeiro	PTS	10	02/01/1981	(Balearic Islands) Palma de Mallorca	Spain heavyweight title.
Win	39–5–2	(United States) Johnny Blaine	TKO	4	13/09/1980	(Spain) Málaga	
Win	38–5–2	(United States) Bob Stallings	DQ	6	01/08/1980	(Balearic Islands) Palma de Mallorca	
Win	37–5–2	(United Kingdom) Neil Malpass	PTS	8	17/07/1980	(Spain) Barcelona	
Win	36–5–2	(Wales) Winston Allen	PTS	8	21/06/1980	(Spain) Barcelona	
Win	35–5–2	(United Kingdom) Tommy Kiely	PTS	8	09/05/1980	(Spain) Barcelona	
Win	34–5–2	Fetiche Kassongo	TKO	3	07/03/1980	(Spain) Barcelona	
Loss	33–5–2	(United States) Leon Spinks	KO	5	12/01/1980	(United States) Resorts Casino Hotel, Atlantic City, New Jersey	Alfredo knocked out at 2:43 of the fifth round.
Win	33–4–2	(United Kingdom) Tony Moore	PTS	8	08/12/1979	(Spain) A Coruña	
Win	32–4–2	(United States) Calvin Langston	TKO	3	01/12/1979	(Spain) Pamplona	
Win	31–4–2	(Cameroon) Jacob Tchanthuing	RTD	2	08/11/1979	(Spain) Bilbao	
Win	30–4–2	(United Kingdom) Tony Moore	PTS	8	27/10/1979	(Spain) A Coruña	
Win	29–4–2	(United States) Elliott Bryant	TKO	3	04/08/1979	(Spain) Vigo	
Win	28–4–2	(United States) Dan Ronnell Johnson	RTD	2	27/07/1979	(Spain) Santander, Cantabria	
Win	27–4–2	(United States) Johnny Blaine	TKO	2	21/07/1979	(Spain) Logroño	
Draw	26–4–2	(Spain) Felipe Rodriquez Piñeiro	PTS	10	14/07/1979	(Spain) Pontevedra	Spain heavyweight title.
Loss	26–4–1	(Italy) Lorenzo Zanon	PTS	12	18/04/1979	(Italy) Turin	European heavyweight title.
Win	26–3–1	(Peru) Guillermo de la Cruz	KO	4	18/03/1979	(Spain) Valencia	
Win	25–3–1	(France) Lucien Rodriguez	KO	2	02/03/1979	(Belgium) Liege	European heavyweight title.
Win	24–3–1	(Italy) Dante Cane	KO	4	26/12/1978	(Italy) Bologna	European heavyweight title.
Loss	23–3–1	(United States) Larry Holmes	KO	7	10/11/1978	(United States) Caesars Palace, Las Vegas, Nevada	WBC heavyweight title. Alfredo knocked out at 2:14 of the seventh round.
Win	23–2–1	(United States) Joe Maye	KO	3	09/09/1978	(Spain) A Coruña	
Win	22–2–1	(Cameroon) Jacob Tchanthuing	KO	8	11/08/1978	(Spain) Lepe	
Win	21–2–1	(United States) Jody Ballard	SD	10	09/06/1978	(United States) Caesars Palace, Las Vegas, Nevada	
Win	20–2–1	(United States) Billy Joiner	KO	1	27/05/1978	Leon, Spain	
Win	19–2–1	(United Kingdom) Billy Aird	PTS	15	03/03/1978	Leon, Spain	European heavyweight title.
Win	18–2–1	(Belgium) Jean-Pierre Coopman	KO	1	26/11/1977	(Belgium) Brussels	European heavyweight title.
Win	17–2–1	(United States) Pedro Soto	TKO	8	29/09/1977	(United States) Madison Square Garden, New York City	Referee stopped the bout at 1:43 of the eighth round.
Win	16–2–1	(France) Lucien Rodriguez	TKO	11	09/09/1977	(Spain) Madrid	European heavyweight title.
Win	15–2–1	(France) Christian Poncelet	TKO	3	17/06/1977	(Spain) Madrid	
Loss	14–2–1	(United States) Muhammad Ali	UD	15	16/05/1977	(United States) Capitol Centre, Landover, Maryland	WBA/WBC heavyweight titles.
Loss	14–1–1	(Italy) Lorenzo Zanon	PTS	8	04/02/1977	(Spain) Bilbao	
Win	14–0–1	(Peru) Guillermo De la Cruz	TKO	6	03/12/1976	(Uruguay) Montevideo	
Win	13–0–1	(Zaire) Lisimo Obutobe	TKO	5	19/11/1976	(Spain) Madrid	
Win	12–0–1	(Netherlands) Rudi Lubbers	TKO	3	08/10/1976	(Spain) Madrid Sports Palace, Madrid	
Win	11–0–1	(Spain) Fermin Hernandez	KO	4	07/08/1976	(Spain) Santa Cruz de Tenerife	
Win	10–0–1	(United Kingdom) Tony Moore	PTS	8	21/07/1976	(Spain) Bilbao	
Win	9–0–1	(Italy) Mario Baruzzi	TKO	4	02/07/1976	(Spain) Barcelona	
Win	8–0–1	(France) Lucien Rodriguez	TKO	4	02/06/1976	(Spain) Bilbao	
Win	7–0–1	(Spain) Jose Manuel Urtain	RTD	5	14/05/1976	(Spain) Madrid	
Win	6–0–1	(Italy) Benito Penna	RTD	2	23/04/1976	(Spain) Madrid	
Win	5–0–1	(Italy) Giuseppe Ros	PTS	8	02/04/1976	(Spain) Madrid	
Win	4–0–1	(Wales) Neville Meade	PTS	8	12/03/1976	(Spain) Madrid	
Draw	3–0–1	(Spain) Jose Antonio Galvez	PTS	8	21/02/1976	(Spain) Almeria	
Win	3–0	(Italy) Adriano Rosati	KO	3	29/01/1976	(Spain) Bilbao	
Win	2–0	(Argentina) Santiago Alberto Lovell	KO	2	25/12/1975	(Spain) Bilbao	
Win	1–0	(Italy) Angelo Visini	TKO	1	10/10/1975	(Spain) Madrid	
