= Muhammad Ali vs. Alfredo Evangelista =

Boxing competition

The Parade of Champions
- Date: May 16, 1977
- Venue: Capital Centre, Landover, Maryland, US
- Title(s) on the line: WBA, WBC, and The Ring undisputed heavyweight championship

Tale of the tape
Boxer	(United States) Muhammad Ali	(Uruguay) Alfredo Evangelista
Nickname	"The Greatest"	
Hometown	Louisville, Kentucky, U.S.	Montevideo, Uruguay
Purse	$2.7 million	$85,000
Pre-fight record	53–2 (37 KO)	14–1–1 (11 KO)
Age	35 years, 3 months	22 years, 5 months
Height	6 ft 3 in (191 cm)	6 ft 1 1/2 in (187 cm)
Weight	221 lb (100 kg)	209 lb (95 kg)
Style	Orthodox	Orthodox
Recognition	WBA, WBC and The Ring undisputed Heavyweight Champion	WBA; No. 8 Ranked Heavyweight; WBC; No. 10 Ranked Heavyweight

Result
- Ali wins via 15-round unanimous decision (71-65, 72-64, 72-64)

Muhammad Ali vs. Alfredo Evangelista, billed as The Parade of Champions, was a professional boxing match contested on May 16, 1977, for the undisputed heavyweight championship. The fight was held before a crowd of over 12,000 at the Capital Centre along with a prime time broadcast on ABC.

== Background ==
This was Muhammad Ali's ninth title defense during his second title reign, and the first since his third bout with Ken Norton. This close and controversial fight happened over seven months ago, representing the longest break the champion had taken in between title fights.

Alfredo Evangelista was a young and relatively inexperienced fighter, he had scored eleven knockouts in just fourteen victories in just over a year, and suffered only one defeat. By 1977, Evangelista began entering the heavyweight top ten rankings, and before the fight was ranked eighth by the WBA and 10th by the WBC.

Despite the challenger's formidable left hook, Ali and his team expected an easy victory. Despite the confidence, Ali did make sure to properly train and slim down after having gained significant weight in the time off between fights.

== The Fight ==
The fight proved to be another difficult defense for the champion. Evangelista was able to go the distance with Ali, and managed to land his powerful left hook on several occasions, but only stunned the champion twice (in the sixth and eighth round). Ali heavily used his rope-a-dope tactic, mixed in with his use of the shuffle and jab to outmaneuver the challenger. On several occasions Ali landed effective combinations and even came close to shutting out the challenger, but was unable to knock him out.

The longer the fight lasted, the bolder Evangelista got, but Ali ultimately won the fight by unanimous decision. Ali had effectively out landed Evangelista in punches, particularly in jabs, but the challenger landed more power punches and was seen as the aggressor by the crowd, who booed the decision.

== Aftermath ==
Ali won the bout through a unanimous decision on points (71–65, 72–64, 72–64).

== Quotes ==
"I'm sorry, we televised it" Howard Cosell doing the bout for ABC who later said that this was one of the worst bouts he's ever seen.

"I'm 35 and I danced for 15 rounds, it's a miracle". Ali after his bout with Evangelista.

== Undercard ==
Confirmed bouts:

Winner	Loser	Weight division/title belt(s) disputed	Result
(Puerto Rico) Alfredo Escalera	(United States) Carlos Becerril	WBC World Junior lightweight title	8th-round KO.
(Panama) Roberto Durán	(United States) Javier Muniz	Welterweight (10 rounds)	Unanimous decision.
(United States) Tyrone Everett	(Mexico) Delfino Rodriguez	Lightweight (10 rounds)	4th-round TKO.
(United States) Jody Ballard	(United States) Dave Wilson	Heavyweight (8 rounds)	Unanimous decision.
(United States) Ira Martin	(United States) Johnny Blaine	Heavyweight (6 rounds)	3rd-round KO.
(United States) Wendell Bailey	(United States) Alex Carr	Heavyweight (6 rounds)	2nd-round KO.

== Broadcasting ==
Country	Broadcaster
Australia	Nine Network
Brazil	Band
Canada	CTV
France	TF1
Germany	ARD
Japan	TBS
Mexico	Televisa
Philippines	RPN 9
Spain	TVE
United Kingdom	BBC
United States	ABC

Preceded by vs. Ken Norton III	Muhammad Ali's bouts 16 May 1977	Succeeded by vs. Earnie Shavers
Preceded by vs. Lorenzo Zanon	Alfredo Evangelista's bouts 16 May 1977	Succeeded by vs. Christian Poncelet
