= Muhammad Ali vs. Earnie Shavers =

Boxing competition

- Date: September 29, 1977
- Venue: Madison Square Garden, New York City, New York
- Title(s) on the line: WBA, WBC, and The Ring undisputed heavyweight championship

Tale of the tape
Boxer	(United States) Muhammad Ali	(United States) Earnie Shavers
Nickname	"The Greatest"	"The Black Destroyer"
Hometown	Louisville, Kentucky	Garland, Alabama
Purse	$3,000,000	$300,000
Pre-fight record	54–2 (37 KO)	54–5–1 (52 KO)
Age	35 years, 8 months	33 years
Height	6 ft 3 in (191 cm)	6 ft 0 in (183 cm)
Weight	225 lb (102 kg)	211 lb (96 kg)
Style	Orthodox	Orthodox
Recognition	WBA, WBC and The Ring undisputed heavyweight champion	WBC; No. 4 Ranked Heavyweight

Result
- Ali wins via 15-round unanimous decision (9-5, 9-6, 9-6)

Muhammad Ali vs. Earnie Shavers was a professional boxing match contested on September 29, 1977, for the undisputed heavyweight championship.

The fight went the distance with Ali winning a hard-fought unanimous decision.

== Background ==
This was the 10th title defence by Ali since regaining the championship. Ali entered the fight weighing 225 pounds, while Shavers weighed nearly 15 pounds less than the champion. Shavers was paid one-tenth as much as Ali. However, the $300,000 sum that he made was greater than all the money earned during his entire professional career leading up to the fight.

== The fight ==
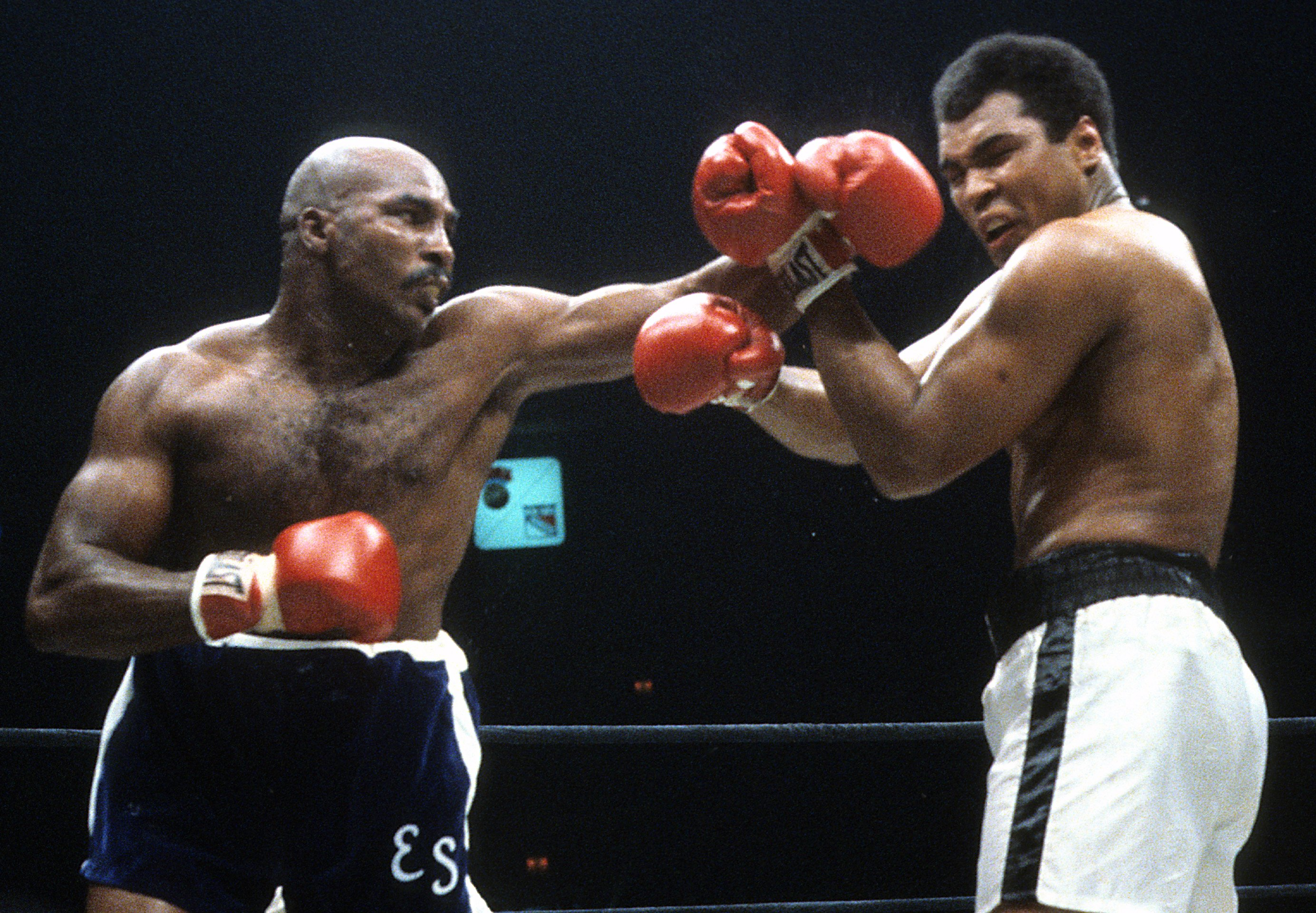

Ali was badly hurt in the second round but, by pretending to be more hurt than he was, deceived Shavers into thinking he was play-acting resulting in Shavers not going for a knockout. Shavers continued to land hard shots to Ali's head and body, forcing the champion to box cautiously and move. Despite this, Ali finished many of the rounds well, winning favor on the judges scorecards.

The fight intensified in the championship rounds, as Shavers mounted a strong comeback in the 13th and 14th rounds, once again leaving Ali badly hurt, but still standing. The final round was close, Shavers started strong landing several hard shots, but the tide turned at the end of the round. After an intense exchange of punches, Ali sent Shavers staggering back against the ropes and nearly to the canvas while continuing to land several clean punches until the final bell.

== Aftermath ==
Boxing experts have regarded Ali's victory over Shavers to be one of the most impressive and brutal performances of his late boxing career.

Sports Illustrated boxing writer Pat Putnam said:

That fight with Shavers, and particularly the last round, sums up for me what Ali was about, even though he was long past his prime. Could have taken him out. He had him hurt early. Ali was ready to be taken, because if Shavers hit you, you were gone. But he suckered Earnie. He faked being more hurt than he was, and conned him out of going for the kill. He fought through that; he fought through fourteen rounds. People talk about Manila; they talk about Foreman; they talk about Liston. But to me, the fifteenth round against Shavers was as magnificent as any round Ali ever fought. He was exhausted. I don't know where he found the strength and stamina to go on, because when he went back to his corner after fourteen there was nothing left in his body. But he came out for the last round and fought three minutes as good as any three minutes I've ever seen. Not many people remember it now, but late in the round, he even had Shavers in trouble. Only the rope kept Shavers from going down.

=== Controversy ===
Although Ali's defence over Shavers is generally well regarded, there is some controversy regarding the judges' scoring of the fight. Despite how close the fight was, all three judges had scored Ali the winner by a wide margin, 9 out of the 15 rounds. The result drew loud boos in the stadium when the scores were read out. Shavers had landed 266 punches to Ali's 208, threw 878 punches to Ali's 709, and landed 30% of his punches to Ali's 29%. Shavers also landed 208 power punches to 128 for Ali. Shavers outlanded Ali in 8 out of 15 rounds.

Sportswriters Bob Canobbio and Lee Groves contended that "the illogical scoring patterns heavily favored Ali during this period in his career... the fourth round saw Shavers out-throw Ali 63–26, out-land him 22–1, achieve accuracy gaps of 35%-4% overall and 42%-7% in power, and land the single hardest shot of the round, a massive right hand in the closing moments. While judges Tony Castellano and Eva Shain rightly saw Shavers as the winner, Johnny LoBianco awarded the round to Ali." Other alleged irregularities in scoring included none of the three judges scoring the ninth round for Shavers (in which he landed 13 punches to Ali's 4, with higher accuracy and a higher ratio of power punches) while unanimously scoring the much closer tenth round (in which Ali outlanded Shavers 24–23, but Shavers still landed more power shots and had higher accuracy) for Ali.

== Broadcasting ==
Country	Broadcaster
Australia	Nine Network
Brazil	Band
Canada	CTV
France	TF1
Germany	ARD
Japan	TBS
Mexico	Televisa
Philippines	RPN 9
Spain	TVE
United Kingdom	BBC
United States	NBC

== Undercard ==
Confirmed bouts:

Winner	Loser	Weight division/title belt(s) disputed	Result
(United States) Mike Rossman	(Canada) Gary Summerhays	Light Heavyweight (10 rounds)	Unanimous decision.
(Nicaragua) Alexis Arguello	(United States) Jerome Artis	Lightweight (10 rounds)	2nd-round TKO.
(Uruguay) Alfredo Evangelista	(Puerto Rico) Pedro Soto	Heavyweight (10 rounds)	8th-round TKO.
(Colombia) Bernardo Mercado	(United States) Roger Russell	Heavyweight (4 rounds)	1st-round TKO.

Preceded by vs. Alfredo Evangelista	Muhammad Ali's bouts 29 September 1977	Succeeded by vs. Leon Spinks
Preceded by vs. Howard Smith	Earnie Shavers's bouts 29 September 1977	Succeeded by vs. Larry Holmes
