= Muhammad Ali vs. Ken Norton III =

Professional boxing match contested on September 28, 1976

- Date: September 28, 1976
- Venue: Yankee Stadium, The Bronx, New York, U.S.
- Title(s) on the line: WBA, WBC and The Ring undisputed heavyweight championship

Tale of the tape
Boxer	Muhammad Ali	Ken Norton
Nickname	The Greatest	The Black Hercules
Hometown	Louisville, Kentucky, U.S.	San Diego, California, U.S.
Purse	$6,000,000	$1,000,000
Pre-fight record	52–2 (37 KO)	37–3 (30 KO)
Age	34 years, 8 months	33 years, 1 month
Height	6 ft 3 in (191 cm)	6 ft 3 in (191 cm)
Weight	221 lb (100 kg)	217 1/2 lb (99 kg)
Style	Orthodox	Orthodox
Recognition	WBA, WBC and The Ring undisputed Heavyweight Champion	WBA/WBC; No. 1 Ranked Heavyweight

Result
- Ali wins via 15-round unanimous decision (8-6, 8-7, 8-7)

Muhammad Ali vs. Ken Norton III was a professional boxing match contested on September 28, 1976, for the undisputed heavyweight championship. Ali won by a controversial unanimous decision.

== Background ==
External audio
- National Press Club Luncheon Speakers, Muhammad Ali and Ken Norton, August 27, 1976, 1:02:57, Norton speaks at 8:58, Ali 11:10-39:00, Library of Congress

Ali and Norton met for the third and last time on September 28, 1976, at Yankee Stadium to complete their trilogy. Norton won their first encounter, while Ali took the second. This time, 34-year-old Ali entered the ring as the Heavyweight Champion, making the eighth defense of his title since his victory over George Foreman in 1974.

This was the first bout to be held at Yankee Stadium since the first fight between Floyd Patterson and Ingemar Johansson in June 1959.

== The fight ==
Both fighters showed their strengths, but neither established themselves as the obvious winner. Most commentators gave the fight to Norton. Ultimately, Arthur Mercante Sr. scored the bout 8 to 6 while Harold Lederman and Barney Smith had it 8 to 7, all in favour of the champion, giving Ali a unanimous decision victory.

Overall, Ali landed 199 of 709 punches while Norton landed 286 of 635 punches, per Bob Canobbio's CompuBox statistics. Norton both landed more punches and had far better accuracy (45% vs 28%). Norton also landed 192 power punches to Ali's 128.

== Aftermath ==
Of the 21 sportswriters polled after the fight, 17 believed that Norton won. Ali said during an interview with Mark Cronin in October 1976: "Kenny's style is too difficult for me. I can't beat him, and I sure don't want to fight him again. I honestly thought he beat me in Yankee Stadium, but the judges gave it to me, and I'm grateful to them." Norton was bitter, stating after the fight: "I won at least nine or ten rounds. I was robbed."

Norton said of the result years later: "If you saw the look on Ali's face at the end, he knew I beat him. He didn't hit me hard the whole fight. Then they announced the judges' decision and I was bitter, very bitter. Not towards Ali... he'd done his job, he was just there to fight. But I was hurt, I was mad, I was angry. I was upset... and it still upsets me."

== Undercard ==
Confirmed bouts:

Winner	Loser	Weight division/title belt(s) disputed	Result
(United States) Earnie Shavers	(United States) Henry Clark	Heavyweight (10 rounds)	2nd-round TKO.
(United States) Mike Rossman	(Republic of Ireland) Christy Elliott	Light heavyweight (10 rounds)	3rd-round KO.
(Colombia) Bernardo Mercado	(United States) James J Woody	Heavyweight (10 rounds)	3rd-round TKO.
(Costa Rica) Gilbert Acuna	(United States) Peter Muller	Heavyweight (4 rounds)	1st-round KO.
(United States) Bill Sharkey	(United States) Joe Maye	Heavyweight (4 rounds)	Unanimous decision.
(United States) Greg Sorrentino	(United States) Johnny Blaine	Heavyweight (4 rounds)	Unanimous decision.
(United States) Dennis Jordan	(United States) Jerry Thompkins	Heavyweight (4 rounds)	1st-round KO.
(United States) Otis Gordon	(United States) Kevin Smith	Heavyweight (4 rounds)	1st-round TKO.

== Broadcasting ==
Country	Broadcaster
Australia	Seven Network
Brazil	Band
Canada	CTV
France	TF1
Germany	ARD
Japan	TBS
Mexico	Televisa
Philippines	RPN 9
Spain	TVE
United Kingdom	BBC
United States	Closed-circuit television CBS (rerun)

Preceded by vs. Richard Dunn	Muhammad Ali's bouts September 28, 1976	Succeeded by vs. Alfredo Evangelista
Preceded by vs. Larry Middleton	Ken Norton's bouts September 28, 1976	Succeeded by vs. Duane Bobick
