= Jimmy O'Hara =

Boxing Commissioner State of Minnesota

James John O'Hara
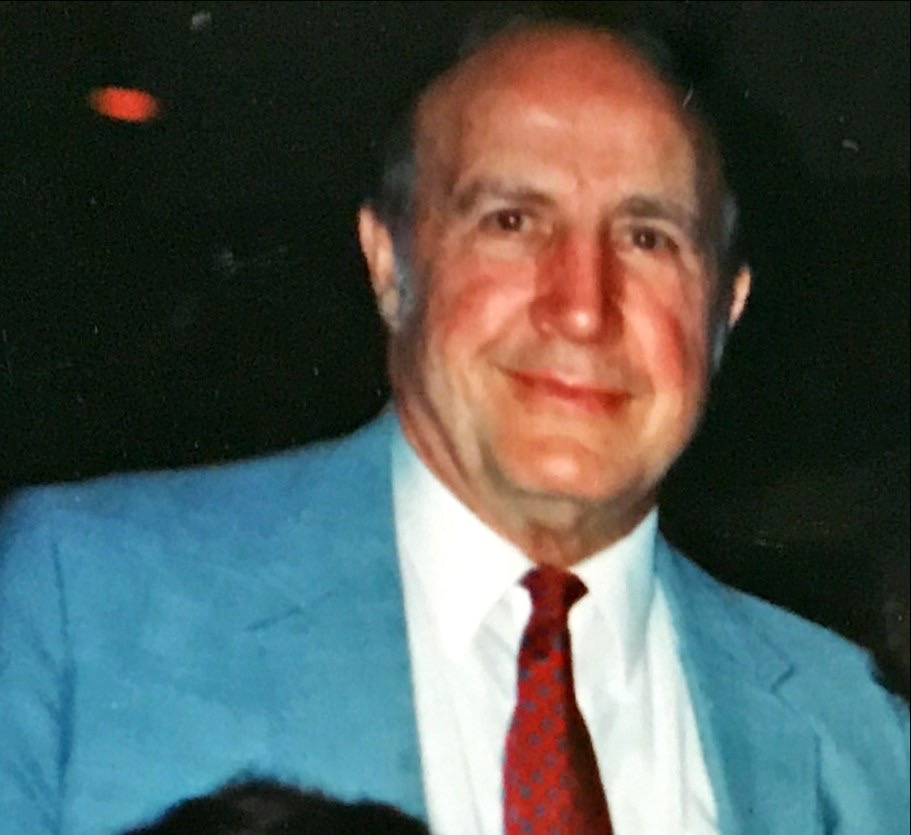

Boxing Commissioner State of Minnesota
- In office June 1, 1976 – January 17, 2002
- Preceded by: Larry McCaleb
- Succeeded by: Scott LeDoux

Executive Secretary of Minnesota Boxing Board

Personal details
- Born: December 23, 1925 St. Paul, Minnesota, U.S.
- Died: January 17, 2002 (aged 76) St. Paul, Minnesota, U.S.
- Spouse: Kathleen M. O'Hara
- Children: Gary; Lynn; Steven; Jeffrey

James John O'Hara (born James John Ehrich; December 3, 1925 – January 17, 2002) was a commissioner and then executive secretary for the Minnesota Board of Boxing from 1976 to 2001. When O'Hara was appointed to the Minnesota Board of Boxing, he was a retired light heavyweight amateur and retired professional heavyweight boxer. O'Hara retired from the ring in 1953 with a claim to the Minnesota professional heavyweight title after a win over Don Jasper.

== Boxing career ==
=== Golden Gloves ===
O'Hara competed in the Northwest Golden Gloves tournament in 1943, 1944, and 1945 as a light heavyweight. He was 4-F, unfit for military service, due to gout attacks which he suffered all his life.

Over the winter of 1943–1944, O'Hara won the St. Paul Golden Gloves tournament as a light-heavy. He finished runner up at the Northwest Golden Gloves tournament, having been rated an even chance to win the championship.

During the 1945 Golden Gloves, a rivalry began between O'Hara and Earl Adkinson that followed the fighters into their professional careers. O'Hara and Adkinson fought three times in 1945, with O'Hara never managing the upper hand over Adkinson.

=== Minnesota State Heavyweight Champion ===
O'Hara's unanimous decision over Don Jasper on August 27, 1953, gave him a claim to the Minnesota professional heavyweight title, though there was some controversy, as the fight was only six rounds as opposed to ten.

=== Amateur fight record ===
Date	Opponent	Result
1943		
February 4, 1943	Dave Gagaliardi	Win
February 9, 1943	Gene Fesenmaier	Loss, WO
April 28, 1943	Bill Luff	Loss
May 14, 1943	Bill Luff	Loss
July 7, 1943	Pvt. Nick Mauro	
October 26, 1943	Les Supkolvis	
November 26, 1943	Casey Milespie	Win, KO
November 29, 1943	Roger La Count	Win
December 7, 1943	Al Cotton	
1944		
February 4, 1944	Warren Wellers	Win
February 4, 1944	Dick Woodley	Win
February 8, 1944	Art Skipton	Win, TKO
February 9, 1944	Gene Fesenmaier	Win
February 14, 1944	Waldo Serie	Win
February 14, 1944	Larry Rasley	Loss
February 21, 1944	Bud Bunn	
March 6, 1944	Roger La Count	
March 17, 1944	Gene Fesenmaier	Win
April 18, 1944	Bud Bunn	
May 16, 1944	Joe Stepka	Loss
October 10, 1944	Chuck Hensel	Loss
October 25, 1944	Bill Shoberg	Win
November 3, 1944	Chuck Hensel	Win
November 8, 1944	Bearcat Fischer	Win, KO
November 20, 1944	Budd Bunn	Win
December 1, 1944	Budd Bunn	Win, TKO
1945		
January 12, 1945	Dick Radman	Win
January 26, 1945	Jim Tappe	Win
January 30, 1945	Erle (Earl) Adkinson	Loss
March 16, 1945	Alton Thostenson	Win
March 20, 1945	Erle (Earl) Adkinson	Loss

=== Professional fight record ===
Date	Opponent	Result
1945		
May 18, 1945	Jack Taylor	Win, KO
June 8, 1945	Earl Adkinson	Loss, KO
1948		
April 8, 1948	Willie Dee Jones	Loss, PTS
September 7, 1948	Willie Dee Jones	Loss, PTS
1950		
June 1, 1950	Big Jack Herman	Win, KO
June 14, 1950	Big Jack Herman	Loss, KO
September 27, 1950	Tony Gallus	Win, PTS
1953		
March 5, 1953	Tom Tierney	Win, TKO
August 27, 1953	Don Jasper	Win, PTS
October 27, 1953	Jack Wagner	Loss, TKO
November 24, 1953	Joe Thomas	Win, KO

== Minnesota Boxing Commissioner ==
O'Hara was appointed to the Minnesota Board of Boxing in 1976 by Minnesota Governor Wendell Anderson. Soon after, O'Hara was voted by the board to serve as its executive secretary, a paid advisory position, in which capacity he served for 25 years.

"He was a great mediator and diplomat," said Joe Azzone, past Chair of the Boxing Board. "I always thought Jim was the wisest guy I ever met," said international boxing referee Denny Nelson. "He knew how to handle people."

O'Hara was one of four long-term leaders in the history of boxing regulation in Minnesota. The others were George Barton (who served 27 years), Jack Gibbons (19 years), and Scott LeDoux (23 years, including 18 years with O'Hara). A journalist for over 50 years, Barton received in 1952 the James J. Walker Award from the Boxing Writers' Association of New York. Jack Gibbons, the son of boxing legend Mike Gibbons, boxed professionally as a light-heavy and retired with a record of 57 wins (20 by KO), five losses (none by KO), and one draw. Scott LeDoux was a former heavyweight contender in the 1970s and 1980s.

== Personal life and death ==
=== Mike O'Hara ===
On November 3, 1951, Jimmy O'Hara's brother and fellow boxer, Michael Ehrich (known as Mike O'Hara), was shot and killed by Bernard L. "Mutt" Martineau. Martineau was convicted of manslaughter and sentenced to ten to twenty years in Stillwater prison. After his retirement from the ring, Jimmy helped create a boxing program at Stillwater prison.

=== John O'Hara ===
Another brother, John O'Hara, was a professional middleweight boxer with a record of 18 wins, 13 losses, and one draw. John O'Hara reportedly drew with Ronald Reagan in a street fight.

=== Business ===
O'Hara made his living as a businessman, partnering with Jerry Hurley as a wholesaler to bars and restaurants.

=== Cancer ===
O'Hara died on January 17, 2002, from late-stage bladder cancer.

== Legacy ==
=== Boxing ===
O'Hara was inducted into the Minnesota Boxing Hall of Fame in 2014, ultimately being recognized for his work in boxing administration, including 25 years as head of the Minnesota Boxing Board. His commemoration reads, in part:

"He was an iconic figure on the streets of St. Paul [Minnesota], a man recognized by countless of his fellow citizens. He was very simply Mr. Boxing."

Upon O'Hara's death in 2002, St. Paul Pioneer Press sportswriter Tom Powers offered this assessment: "O'Hara, as much a part of the fabric of St. Paul as the cathedral or the capitol building, worked with promoters, handlers and fighters, always gently steering them in the right direction. He could tell them where to get proper health insurance as easily as he could recommend a qualified referee.
