= Larry Holmes vs. Scott LeDoux =

- Date: July 7, 1980
- Venue: Met Center, Bloomington, Minnesota, U.S.
- Title(s) on the line: WBC and The Ring heavyweight titles

Tale of the tape
Boxer	Larry Holmes	Scott LeDoux
Nickname	The Easton Assassin	The Fighting Frenchman
Hometown	Easton, Pennsylvania, U.S.	Crosby-Ironton, Minnesota, U.S.
Purse	$1,200,000	$350,000
Pre-fight record	34–0 (25 KO)	26–8–4 (17 KO)
Age	30 years, 4 months	30 years, 1 month
Height	6 ft 3 in (191 cm)	6 ft 1 1/2 in (187 cm)
Weight	214 1/4 lb (97 kg)	226 lb (103 kg)
Style	Orthodox	Orthodox
Recognition	WBC and The Ring; Heavyweight Champion	WBC; No. 8 Ranked Heavyweight

Result
- Holmes wins via seventh-round technical knockout

Larry Holmes vs. Scott LeDoux was a professional match contested on July 7, 1980, for the WBC heavyweight title.

== Background ==
Immediately following his victory over Leroy Jones, WBC heavyweight champion Larry Holmes announced plans to make his next title defense against fringe contender Scott LeDoux. Original plans called for Holmes to move on to a unification bout with John Tate, who faced Mike Weaver on the same telecast as the Holmes–Jones fight, but Tate opted to make plans to face a returning Muhammad Ali instead. Ali was in talks to face LeDoux in a tune-up bout before facing Tate, but Tate's loss to Weaver and LeDoux subsequently signing on to face Holmes derailed those plans.

Rather than face Weaver, Ali held a press conference on April 16, 1980, at the Beverly Wilshire Hotel announcing that he would instead be challenging Holmes. Holmes and Ali and their respective promoters, Don King and Murad Muhammad, reached an agreement to face one another on July 11, with the bout set to take place in Rio de Janeiro's Maracanã Stadium. However, the Holmes–Ali was temporally shelved when the superintendent of the Maracanã Stadium, Ricardo Labre balked at the idea of hosting the fight, citing potential damage to the grass field used for soccer. Following the cancellation of the Ali fight, Holmes and King pivoted back to LeDoux. King announced the Holmes–LeDoux fight on May 19 with the Met Center in LeDoux's native Minnesota being named the venue, becoming the state's first ever heavyweight title fight.

== Fight details ==
In what proved to be a one-sided affair, Holmes dominated LeDoux through six+ rounds. Holmes landed his trademark left jab almost at will, severely damaging LeDoux's left eye, which was bleeding and badly swollen by then end of the fight and, as LeDoux admitted afterwards, left him unable to see out of during the later rounds. The beginning of the end for LeDoux came with around 30 seconds left in round six after Holmes landed a right uppercut that caused LeDoux to fall to his knees for the only official knockdown in the fight. LeDoux would answer the 10-count, but would protest to referee Davey Pearl that he had been illegally thumbed, though the knockdown would stand. Having survived the knockdown, and despite his injured eye, LeDoux would go back out in the seventh round, but after two minutes of action, Pearl would stop the fight after determining that LeDoux could not continue due to the damage to his eye, giving Holmes the victory by technical knockout.

== Fight card ==
Confirmed bouts:

Weight Class	Weight		vs.		Method	Round	Notes
Heavyweight	200+ lbs.	Larry Holmes (c)	def.	Scott LeDoux	TKO	8/15	^{note 1}
Light Welterweight	140 lbs.	Saoul Mamby (c)	def.	Esteban de Jesús	UD	15	^{note 2}
Featherweight	126 lbs.	Edwin Rosario	def.	Jose Luis Lara	TKO	2/10
Cruiserweight	190 lbs.	Paul Ramos	def.	Johnny Townsend	UD	10
Welterweight	147 lbs.	Brian Brunette	def.	Wayne Grant	KO	2/4
Middleweight	160 lbs.	Mark Holmes	def.	Robbie Robertson	TKO	2/4

^Note 1 For WBC and The Ring Heavyweight Titles
^Note 2 For WBC Light Welterweight Title

== Broadcasting ==
Country	Broadcaster
United States	ABC

Preceded by vs. Leroy Jones	Larry Holmes's bouts July 7, 1980	Succeeded by vs. Muhammad Ali
Preceded by vs. Marty Monroe	Scott LeDoux' bouts July 7, 1980	Succeeded by vs. Reggie Fleming
