= Larry Holmes vs. Muhammad Ali =

Boxing competition

The Last Hurrah!
- Date: October 2, 1980
- Venue: Sports Pavilion at Caesars Palace, Paradise, Nevada, U.S.
- Title(s) on the line: WBC, Lineal and The Ring Heavyweight Championship

Tale of the tape
Boxer	Larry Holmes	Muhammad Ali
Nickname	The Easton Assassin	The Greatest
Hometown	Easton, Pennsylvania, U.S.	Louisville, Kentucky, U.S.
Purse	$6,000,000	$8,000,000
Pre-fight record	35–0 (26 KO)	56–3 (37 KO)
Age	30 years, 10 months	38 years, 8 months
Height	6 ft 3 in (191 cm)	6 ft 3 in (191 cm)
Weight	211 1/2 lb (96 kg)	217 1/2 lb (99 kg)
Style	Orthodox	Orthodox
Recognition	WBC and The Ring Heavyweight Champion	Current Lineal Heavyweight Champion

Result
- Holmes wins via 10th-round corner retirement

Larry Holmes vs. Muhammad Ali, billed as The Last Hurrah!, was a professional boxing bout contested on October 2, 1980, in Las Vegas for the WBC and The Ring heavyweight championships.

== Background ==
Larry Holmes was Ali's sparring partner for a long time. "He lived with Ali. They boxed hundreds of rounds. Look for Ali to decision Holmes," said Rollie Schwartz, past national chairman of the AAU Boxing Commission prior to the fight.

After defeating Leon Spinks to regain the WBA heavyweight title on September 15, 1978, Ali announced his retirement in June 1979. On February 14, 1980, Ali told the Associated Press that he was 75 percent sure that he would return to the ring. On March 5, he agreed to fight John Tate, the new WBA heavyweight champion, in a bout tentatively scheduled for June. However, Tate lost the title to Mike Weaver by a 15th-round knockout on March 31. At a press conference on April 16, Ali said he would fight WBC Champion Larry Holmes. The announcement came as a surprise, as the press conference was billed as a contract-signing for a bout between Ali and Weaver. Ali said negotiations for a Weaver fight fell apart the previous night when Weaver's promoter, Bob Arum, issued new demands that "were totally unacceptable."

On April 28, it was officially announced that Ali and Holmes would box on July 11 in Rio de Janeiro at the 165,000-seat Maracanã Stadium. Promoters Don King and Murad Muhammad said Ali would get $8 million and Holmes would receive $4 million. However, the announcement came as a surprise to the boss of the stadium, who said it was "all new to me." Rio de Janeiro State Sports Superintendent Ricardo Labre said, "The chances are 99.9 percent against the bout being held here." He said setting up the ring, seats and other equipment "would destroy our grass. This is a soccer field." The bout was officially called off on May 12. Ali made $250,000 and Holmes $100,000 in forfeit money. After the cancellation, Holmes signed to fight Scott LeDoux, whom he stopped in seven rounds on July 7.

On July 17, 1980, Ali and Holmes signed to fight on October 2 at Caesars Palace in Las Vegas. Promoter Don King said Ali would be paid $8 million and Holmes $6 million. Caesars Palace constructed a temporary 24,790-seat outdoor arena for the fight. The live gate was $6 million, a record for that time.

Due to concerns for Ali's health, the Nevada State Athletic Commission had the former champion examined at Minnesota's Mayo Clinic as a prerequisite to being granted a boxing license. Ali checked into the clinic on July 23, 1980. His neurological exam was conducted by Dr. Frank Howard, whose report contained the following information: Ali showed a slight degree of missing when he tried to touch his finger to his nose, he had difficulty in coordinating the muscles used in speaking, and he did not hop on one foot with expected agility. However, Dr. Howard determined that there were no specific findings to prohibit Ali from fighting. The Mayo Clinic report was forwarded to the Nevada State Athletic Committee, but it was not made public at that time. Based on the report, Ali was granted a license to box in Nevada.

Ali weighed in at 217 1/2 pounds (98.7 kilograms), his lightest weight since he defeated George Foreman on October 30, 1974.

== The fight ==
Holmes dominated every round of the fight. The hot, 89-degree arena tired the aging Ali quickly, who consistently fell victim to quick, sharp jabs and combinations by Holmes. The fight was actively critiqued by announcers on all stations in which it premiered. Most famously, ABC's Wide World of Sports commentator Howard Cosell lamented that the fight was difficult to watch and that, given the legend Ali was, the referee should stop it. Holmes' insistent and rudimentary assembly of punches and combinations put on full display the aging Ali's inability to mount sufficient defense and meaningfully attack opponents. Despite there being no knockdowns, Ali's trainer Angelo Dundee, against the wishes of Ali himself and other cornerman Bundini Brown, stopped the fight and subsequently gave Holmes the win via technical knockout.

Holmes later said that he knew from the start that Ali was not capable of defending himself from the onslaught. The champion was so concerned about what he was doing to Ali that he went to referee Richard Green and told him that Ali was not mounting an effort. Green admonished Holmes and allowed the fight to continue, but Holmes said that after that point he began to slow down his attack since it was clear to him that Ali was out on his feet.

In a later press conference, Ali attributed his sluggish performance in the fight to his overuse of the medication Thyrolar, prescribed to him by his doctor two years prior in order to treat hypothyroidism. Ali's doctor supported this theory, claiming that the medication likely contributed to Ali being overcome by heat exhaustion during the fight.

== Post-fight criticism ==
According to the Telegraph:

It was also revealed after the fight that Ali had been examined at the Mayo Clinic, and the results were shocking. He had admitted to tingling in his hands, and slurring of his speech. With the conclusiveness of Ali's loss to Holmes, and Ali's worrying medical condition, it seemed incredible that he fought again.

According to Ferdie Pacheco, Ali's former ring doctor, "All the people involved in this fight should've been arrested. This fight was an abomination, a crime." Pacheco had earlier quit Ali's camp, in 1977, after Ali's fight with Earnie Shavers. Pacheco claims he had sent Ali's medical results to Angelo Dundee, Jabir Herbert, Muhammad Ali, and Veronica Porché Ali noting that "This is what's happening to you. If you want to continue, you have no shot at a normal life." Pacheco said he received no reply from the recipients to his warning. In 2012 Ali met Pacheco for the last time and told him "you was right", something he had said to Pacheco several times before. According to Pacheco after Ali's death in 2016:

The unnecessary punches he took wouldn't have stopped the Parkinson's. But I think it would not have compounded it as it has. Who knows, Ali may not have passed away now if he'd stopped when I asked. He may not have been trapped in a shell like he was for so many years.

== Undercard ==
Confirmed bouts:

Winner	Loser	Weight division/title belt(s) disputed	Result
(United States) Saoul Mamby	(United States) Maurice Watkins	WBC Super Lightweight Title	Unanimous decision.
(United States) Leon Spinks	(Colombia) Bernardo Mercado	Heavyweight (12 rounds)	9th-round TKO.
(United States) Michael Dokes	(United States) Tom Fisher	Heavyweight (10 rounds)	7th-round TKO.
(United States) Mark Holmes	(United States) Randy Rivers	Middleweight (6 rounds)	Unanimous decision
(United States) Ronnie Smith	(United States) Danny Cruz	Lightweight (4 rounds)	Unanimous decision.

== Broadcasting ==
Country	Broadcaster
Mexico	Televisa
Philippines	MBS 4
United Kingdom	ITV
United States	ABC

Preceded by vs. Scott LeDoux	Larry Holmes's bouts 2 October 1980	Succeeded by vs. Trevor Berbick
Preceded by vs. Leon Spinks II	Muhammad Ali's bouts 2 October 1980	Succeeded by vs. Trevor Berbick
