= Larry Holmes vs. Trevor Berbick =

- Date: April 11, 1981
- Venue: Caesars Palace, Paradise, Nevada, U.S.
- Title(s) on the line: WBC and The Ring heavyweight titles

Tale of the tape
Boxer	Larry Holmes	Trevor Berbick
Nickname	The Easton Assassin	
Hometown	Easton, Pennsylvania, U.S.	Port Antonio, Jamaica
Purse	$1,125,000	$175,000
Pre-fight record	36–0 (27 KO)	18–1–1 (17 KO)
Age	31 years, 5 months	26 years, 8 months
Height	6 ft 3 in (191 cm)	6 ft 2 in (188 cm)
Weight	215 lb (98 kg)	215 lb (98 kg)
Style	Orthodox	Orthodox
Recognition	WBC and The Ring; Heavyweight Champion	Canadian; Heavyweight Champion; WBC; No. 5 Ranked Heavyweight

Result
- Holmes wins via 15-round unanimous decision (150–135, 146–140, 146–139)

Larry Holmes vs. Trevor Berbick was a professional boxing match contested on April 11, 1981, for the WBC and The Ring heavyweight titles.

== Background ==
Following his blowout victory over four-time heavyweight champion Muhammad Ali in October 1980, WBC heavyweight champion Larry Holmes in November that a fight with another former heavyweight champion, Leon Spinks, would happen the following year. However, Holmes first wanted to defend his title in what would be expected to amount to little more than a tune-up prior to facing Spinks and then Gerry Cooney afterwards. Fringe contender Marty Monroe was initially tagged to be Holmes next opponent in early 1981, but talks stalled and the fight was called off. Instead, Holmes reached an agreement in early January 1981 to next face Canadian heavyweight champion Trevor Berbick, who was also WBC's fifth-ranked heavyweight contender, with the fight being officially announced a month later at a press conference in New York City.

While in the midst of training for the fight, Holmes split with his longtime trainer and manager Richie Giachetti, who had been with Holmes since he turned professional in 1973, over a dispute regarding Giachetti's managerial duties. Holmes told the media that he had been his own manager for some time and had been letting Giachetti "go through the motions" and would not allow Giachetti to tell him "what to do." As a result, Holmes enlisted renowned trainer Eddie Futch to take over training duties. When asked if how he felt about joining Holmes' camp just before a title fight, Futch stated "I don't think either of us will have difficulty adjusting. He knows me and I'm not going to pull any changes."

Holmes was a heavy favorite, with odds reported to be at 50–1 in his favor.

== Fight details ==
Though not expected to be much of a challenge, Berbick became the first fighter to go the full 15-round distance with Holmes since Holmes had captured the title from Ken Norton in March 1978, ending the eight-fight knockout streak Holmes had accumulated as champion. Though Holmes was named the winner on all three of the judge's scorecards by rather comfortable margins of 150–135, 146–140 and 146–139, Berbick proved to be a game opponent, never appearing to be in danger of going down despite taking punishment from Holmes' trademark left jab, while landing clean right hands to Holmes' face throughout the fight.

Post-fight, Holmes praised Berbick's performance stating "This showed you can't take anyone lightly. He took everything I had and then some. I thought it would end in eight rounds but he just wouldn't go down. Other fighters can't take the punches he took."

== Fight card ==
Confirmed bouts:

Weight Class	Weight		vs.		Method	Round	Notes
Heavyweight	200+ lbs.	Larry Holmes (c)	def.	Trevor Berbick	UD	15	^{note 1}
Light Welterweight	140 lbs.	Leroy Haley	def.	Willie Rodriguez	UD	12	^{note 2}
Middleweight	160 lbs.	Robby Epps	def.	Dwight Davison	UD	10
Welterweight	147 lbs.	Larry Martin	def.	Milton Seward	PTS	10
Light Welterweight	140 lbs.	Lonnie Smith	def.	Elias Rodriguez	TKO	2/6
Middleweight	160 lbs.	Mark Holmes	def.	Kenny Hodges	KO	6/6

^Note 1 For WBC and The Ring Heavyweight Titles
^Note 2 For NABF Light Welterweight Title

== Broadcasting ==
Country	Broadcaster
United States	HBO

Preceded by vs. Muhammad Ali	Larry Holmes's bouts April 11, 1981	Succeeded by vs. Leon Spinks
Preceded by vs. Chuck Gardner	Trevor Berbick's bouts April 11, 1981	Succeeded by vs. Conroy Nelson
