= Greg Page (boxer) =

American boxer

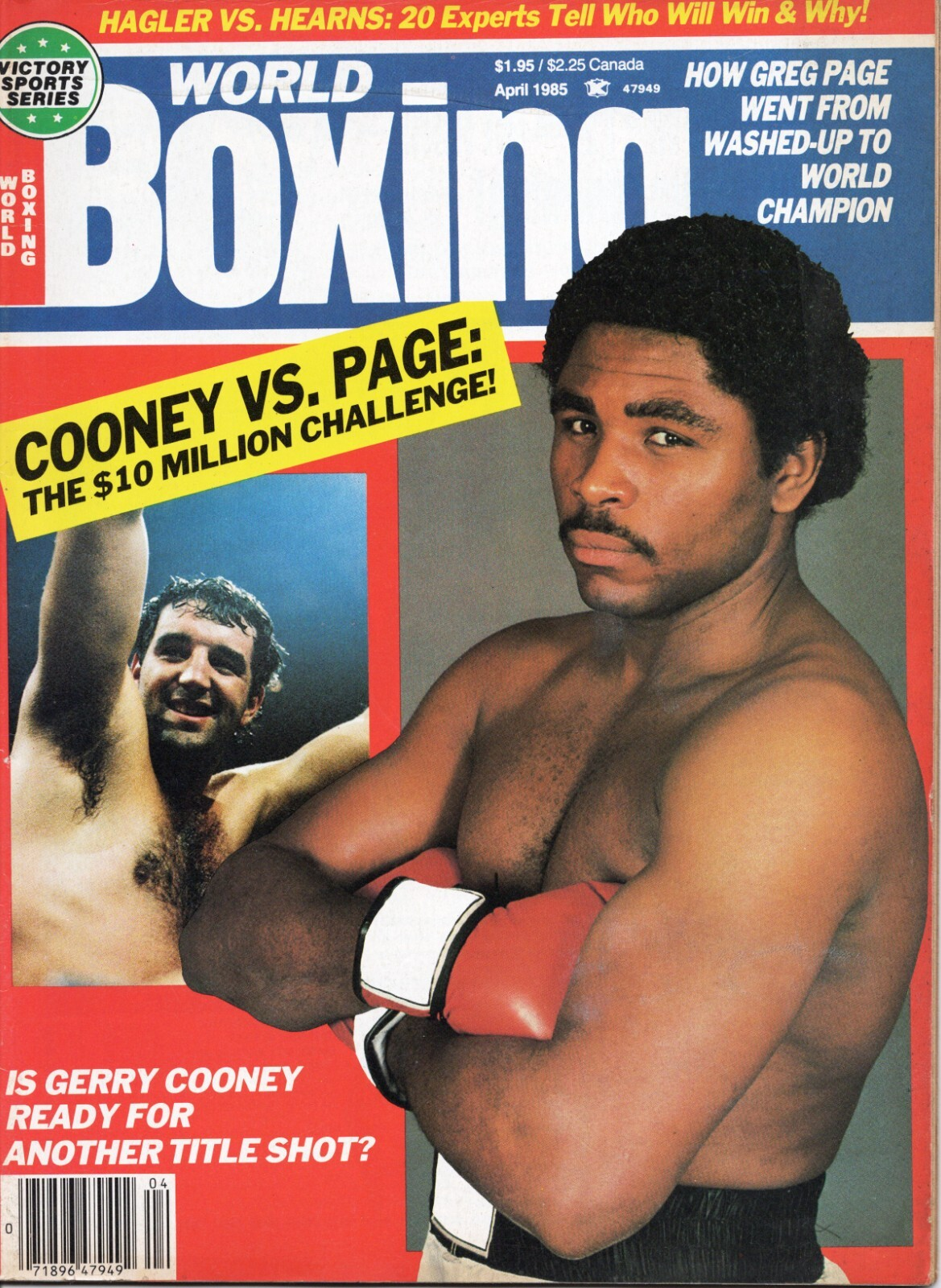
- Page (right) on the cover of an issue of World Boxing magazine, cover dated April 1985

Personal information
- Nationality: American
- Born: October 25, 1958 Louisville, Kentucky, U.S.
- Died: April 27, 2009 (aged 50) Louisville, Kentucky, U.S.
- Height: 6 ft 2 in (188 cm)
- Weight: Heavyweight

Boxing career
- Reach: 81 in (206 cm)
- Stance: Orthodox

Boxing record
- Total fights: 76
- Wins: 58
- Win by KO: 48
- Losses: 17
- Draws: 1

Greg Page (October 25, 1958 – April 27, 2009) was an American professional boxer who competed from 1979 to 2001, and held the WBA heavyweight title from 1984 to 1985. He outpointed former Heavyweight World Champion James Smith and knocked Gerrie Coetzee out. He was also a regular sparring partner for Mike Tyson, famously knocking down the then-undefeated world champion during a 1990 session.

== Amateur career ==
Page, after a brief stint with a Southern Indiana trainer, began amateur boxing at age 15 under the tutelage of Leroy Emerson at the Louisville Parks Department gym in the Cherokee Triangle neighborhood.

He first came to the public's attention by sparring several rounds with the Muhammad Ali.

In 1976, at the USA–USSR Duals at the Caesars Palace, Las Vegas, Page scored a major victory when he defeated Igor Vysotsky, a top-ranked heavyweight amateur boxer in the world, who never has been knocked down, the big punching Russian who twice beat the legendary Cuban and three-time Olympic Gold Medalist Teofilo Stevenson. Page also beat James Tillis, Tony Tubbs, Mitch Green, and Marvin Stinson.

By that time he was the #1 ranked amateur heavyweight in the United States.

At the USA vs. socialist countries duals held in 1977-1978 Page defeated Polish Antoni Kuskowski on points (3–0), lost a 1–2 points decision to Cuban Angel Milián, stopped Romanian Mircea Șimon in the third round, defeated East German Juergen Fanghaenel on points.

Page won the National AAU Heavyweight Championship in 1977. The following year, he repeated as the National AAU Heavyweight Champion and won the National Golden Gloves Heavyweight Championship.

=== Amateur highlights ===
- 1975 National Golden Gloves Quarterfinalist, losing a decision to John Tate.
- (gold) 1976 Ohio State Fair Champion, upsetting National AAU Champion Marvin Stinson.
- (bronze) 1976 National Golden Gloves Semi-Finalist, losing a decision to Michael Dokes.
- (gold) 1977 National AAU Heavyweight Champion, defeating Woody Clark. Page avenged an earlier loss to Clark, and was named the tournament's outstanding boxer.
- (silver) 1977 National Golden Gloves Finalist, losing to Jimmy Clark.
- (gold) 1978 National AAU Heavyweight champion.
- (gold) 1978 National Golden Gloves Heavyweight Champion, stopping William Hosea at 2:38 of the second round
- Defeated Igor Vysotsky, the man who twice beat Cuban legend Teofilo Stevenson.
- Defeated Tony Tubbs six out of seven times while in amateurs.
- Finished amateur career having 105 fights under his belt, with a record of 94–11.

== Professional career ==
=== Early years ===
Page turned pro in February 1979, knocking out Don Martin in two rounds before a crowd of 7,500 at the Commonwealth Convention Center in Louisville. He put together 13 straight wins, 12 by knockout. The only fighter to go the distance with Page was George Chaplin, whom he defeated by a ten-round majority decision. Afterwards, Page was ranked in the top ten by the WBA.

=== USBA heavyweight champion ===
Page won the vacant USBA Heavyweight title on February 7, 1981, with a seventh-round TKO of Stan Ward. He thus became the third heavyweight champion from Louisville in the post-WW2 era, following Muhammad Ali and Jimmy Ellis.

After knocking out Marty Monroe and Alfredo Evangelista, Page had a rematch with George Chaplin and won by a twelve-round split decision. He followed the Chaplin win with a fourth-round knockout of Scott LeDoux.

Page retained the USBA belt with a unanimous decision over Jimmy Young on May 2, 1982. The following month, on the undercard of the Larry Holmes/Gerry Cooney fight, Page fought Trevor Berbick. Fighting with a broken right thumb from the second round, Page lost for the first time as a professional, dropping a ten-round unanimous decision to Berbick.

Page returned to defend the USBA belt against contender James "Quick" Tillis in November 1982. After suffering the first knockdown of his career in the second round, Page came back to KO Tillis in the eighth round.

=== World title fights and becoming WBA heavyweight champion ===
According to a New York Times article, Butch Lewis had Page set up to fight the winner of Mike Weaver-Randy Cobb WBA world title fight in mid-to-late 1982, but Page had switched his allegiance from Lewis to Don King. In addition, Page had contacted his lawyer in March of that year to drop his ranking in the WBA from #2 to #3, behind Michael Dokes.

In 1983, Page retained the USBA title again, beating Renaldo Snipes over twelve rounds and taking his WBC #1 ranking. WBC heavyweight champion Larry Holmes, claiming the $2.55 million purse he was offered to fight Page was insufficient, vacated the WBC title.

In March 1984, Page fought Tim Witherspoon for the vacant WBC belt. Incensed over money troubles with promoter Don King, Page had gone on strike in the gym and arrived out of shape for the bout. Witherspoon, who had lost a disputed decision to Holmes the previous year, pulled off an upset and took the title with a twelve-round majority decision. After the fight, Page fired Leroy Emerson as his trainer.

Page returned in August with new trainer Janks Morton, and fought undefeated David Bey. Page lost his second fight in a row when Bey took a twelve-round unanimous decision.

When Bey refused to fight reigning WBA heavyweight title holder Gerrie Coetzee in Sun City, South Africa due to Apartheid, Page stepped in. Page knocked Coetzee down twice before knocking him out in the eighth round to win the title, in a round that was unusual as it overran by a minute.

Page made his first title defense against Tony Tubbs in Buffalo, New York on April 29, 1985. Page had beaten Tubbs six out of seven times in the amateurs and was the favorite to win, but Tubbs upset the odds and won by a fifteen-round unanimous decision. To make matters worse, Page's hotel room in Buffalo was burgled. Taken was Page's championship belt, a $13,000 watch, and a $10,000 mink coat belonging to his road cook.

=== Downward spiral ===
Page returned to face James "Buster" Douglas in January 1986. Douglas stunned Page and took a unanimous decision. Frequently out of shape, Page also lost to Orlin Norris in a title fight and even to the journeyman Mark Wills.

Page became a regular sparring partner for reigning World Heavyweight Champion Mike Tyson in the late 1980s and boxed on several of his undercards. Before Tyson's upset loss to Buster Douglas in February 1990, Page decked Tyson in a public sparring session. He was believed to be in line to fight Tyson when he lost to Wills.

Page continued to fight and, in 1992, fought the Jamaican Donovan "Razor" Ruddock. Ruddock was returning after two big fights with Tyson that, due to the subsequent incarceration of Tyson, had established Ruddock as arguably the world's best heavyweight. Page gave Ruddock a hard time before being rocked by a series of big shots in the eighth round, which caused the referee to stop the contest.

After defeating former WBA Heavyweight Champion James "Bonecrusher" Smith by a unanimous decision, Page was matched with former WBO Heavyweight Champion Francesco Damiani in September 1992. In a close contest, he lost two points for repeatedly losing his mouthpiece. The point deductions cost Page a draw: All three judges had Damiani winning by two points. In August 1993 Page boxed future WBA Heavyweight Champion Bruce Seldon and was stopped in the ninth round. He retired after the fight.

=== Comeback ===
After retiring, Page began training boxers. He worked with Oliver McCall and was in McCall's corner when he stunningly scored a second-round knockout of Lennox Lewis to win the WBC World Heavyweight Championship in London on September 24, 1994 and was also present for McCall's infamous breakdown in the rematch with Lewis.

He trained boxers for several years, but grew restless. "I was training boxers to fight guys I could beat myself," Page said.

Page returned to the ring in May 1996. He went 16–0–1 with 15 knockouts before taking on Monte Barrett in October 1998. Barrett, 18–0 with 12 knockouts, won by a lopsided unanimous decision.

After dropping a decision to journeyman Artis Pendergrass, Page had a rematch with Tim Witherspoon in June 1999. The 40-year-old Page scored a first round knockdown and won when the 41-year-old Witherspoon tore a muscle in his back and could not come out for the eighth round.

Page went 2–2 in his next four fights. He was well past his prime, but continued to fight because he needed money. In 1998, Page filed for bankruptcy, claiming a $50,000 debt. By 2000, he was working his first 9-to-5 job, painting dental equipment at Whip-Mix Corp. in the South End of Louisville.

=== Injury ===
On March 9, 2001, Page fought Dale Crowe at Peel's Palace in Erlanger, Kentucky for $1,500. Page appeared to be holding his own with Crowe until the tenth round. Crowe said, "The timekeeper smacked the mat with his hand toward the end of the fight to indicate ten seconds were left, and that's when I went after Greg with one last flurry." Crowe hit Page with a flush left to the chin and then pushed him back. Page fell against the ropes, slid down, and was counted out by the referee.

What followed was chaos. There was no ambulance, no team of paramedics, nor oxygen, all of which were required by law. The ringside doctor, Manuel Mediodia, was not licensed in Kentucky and was under suspension in Ohio. At the time of the stoppage, Mediodia had already left and had to be brought back into the building. Twenty-two minutes passed before an ambulance arrived.

Before the fight, Page's trainer, James Doolin, complained to several members of the state commission about the conditions, including the lack of oxygen. He then wrote his complaints on a piece of paper and sealed it inside an envelope. Doolin gave it to the commission chairman, Jack Kerns, who then gave it back to Doolin. "Mail it to me," Kerns said.

Page was taken to the emergency room at St. Luke's hospital, where a CT scan revealed a huge mass being formed by the bleeding inside his head. He was then transported to University Hospital in Cincinnati. During post-fight brain surgery, he suffered a stroke and was left paralyzed on the left side of his body. Page was in a coma for nearly a week.

For the rest of his life, Page suffered many complications from his injury. He was hospitalized numerous times for such ailments as pneumonia, acute respiratory failure, sepsis, hypothermia, and seizures.

Page filed a lawsuit against the state of Kentucky and settled out of court for $1.2 million in 2007. As part of the settlement, boxing safety regulations the state enacted the previous year were named the "Greg Page Safety Initiative."

== Death ==
In the early morning hours of April 27, 2009, Page died at home in Louisville. His death was consistent with positional asphyxia, an inability to breathe because of body position. "He had a hospital bed at home, and he slid out, which he has done before," said Jim Wesley, a Jefferson County deputy coroner. "His head was lodged between the rail and the bed."

About 100 friends, family and admirers gathered at Our Lady of Mount Carmel for his funeral, which ran more than two hours. Amid tears, gospel music and emotional speeches, messages were read from State Senator Gerald Neal, who praised Page's "gallant fight," and Louisville Mayor Jerry Abramson, who said Page's legacy would live on.

== Professional boxing record ==
76 fights	58 wins	17 losses
By knockout	48	6
By decision	9	11
By disqualification	1	0
Draws	1	

No.	Result	Record	Opponent	Type	Round, time	Date	Location	Notes
76	Loss	58–17–1	Dale Crowe	KO	10 (10), 1:56	Mar 9, 2001	Peels Palace, Erlanger, Kentucky, U.S.	For vacant Kentucky heavyweight title
75	Win	58–16–1	Mark Bradley	TKO	1 (10), 1:20	Oct 9, 2000	Longhead's Bar & Grill, Louisville, Kentucky, U.S.	
74	Loss	57–16–1	Robert Davis	TKO	8 (10)	Jun 29, 2000	Hammerstein Ballroom, New York City, New York, U.S.	
73	Win	57–15–1	Terrence Lewis	KO	7 (10), 2:01	Feb 9, 2000	Ramada Inn, Rosemont, Illinois, U.S.	
72	Loss	56–15–1	Jorge Luis González	UD	10	Nov 14, 1999	Rose Garden, Portland, Oregon, U.S.	
71	Win	56–14–1	Tim Witherspoon	RTD	7 (10), 3:00	Jun 18, 1999	Crown Coliseum, Fayetteville, North Carolina, U.S.	
70	Loss	55–14–1	Artis Pendergrass	UD	10	Apr 1, 1999	Coeur d'Alene Casino Resort Hotel, Worley, Idaho, U.S.	
69	Win	55–13–1	Harry Daniels	KO	2 (10), 1:37	Mar 27, 1999	Genesis Convention Center, Gary, Indiana, U.S.	
68	Loss	54–13–1	Monte Barrett	UD	10	Oct 23, 1998	Trump Marina, Atlantic City, New Jersey, U.S.	
67	Win	54–12–1	George Harris	TKO	1 (10)	May 19, 1998	Nashville, Tennessee, U.S.	
66	Win	53–12–1	Marion Wilson	UD	8	Mar 27, 1998	Trump Marina, Atlantic City, New Jersey, U.S.	
65	Draw	52–12–1	Jerry Ballard	PTS	10	Jan 31, 1998	Ice Palace, Tampa, Florida, U.S.	
64	Win	52–12	Rocky Bentley	TKO	1 (8)	Dec 16, 1997	Music City Mix Factory, Nashville, Tennessee, U.S.	
63	Win	51–12	Harry Daniels	PTS	4	Dec 9, 1997	Nashville, Tennessee, U.S.	
62	Win	50–12	James Holly	TKO	1 (8)	Dec 2, 1997	Nashville, Tennessee, U.S.	
61	Win	49–12	Nate Jones	KO	1 (8)	Sep 23, 1997	Nashville, Tennessee, U.S.	
60	Win	48–12	Moses Harris	TKO	3	Sep 9, 1997	Nashville, Tennessee, U.S.	
59	Win	47–12	Robert Boykin	KO	1	Aug 19, 1997	Nashville, Tennessee, U.S.	
58	Win	46–12	Wes Black	TKO	1	Jun 24, 1997	Nashville, Tennessee, U.S.	
57	Win	45–12	Frankie Hines	KO	1	Jun 17, 1997	Nashville, Tennessee, U.S.	
56	Win	44–12	Jerry Barnes	TKO	1	Jun 10, 1997	Nashville, Tennessee, U.S.	
55	Win	43–12	Armando Turrubiartes	KO	1	May 20, 1997	Nashville, Tennessee, U.S.	
54	Win	42–12	Frankie Hines	TKO	1, 1:06	Jul 23, 1996	Blakely's Restaurant & Lounge, Chesapeake, Virginia, U.S.	
53	Win	41–12	Tyrone Miles	KO	1 (10)	Jun 15, 1996	National Guard Armory, Wentworth, North Carolina, U.S.	
52	Win	40–12	James Burch	TKO	1 (10), 1:54	Jun 12, 1996	The Ritz, Raleigh, North Carolina, U.S.	
51	Win	39–12	Robert Jackson	TKO	1 (4), 2:57	May 16, 1996	Elks Lodge, Norfolk, Virginia, U.S.	
50	Loss	38–12	Bruce Seldon	TKO	9 (12), 0:49	Aug 6, 1993	Coliseo Rubén Rodríguez, Bayamón, Puerto Rico	For IBF Inter-Continental heavyweight title
49	Win	38–11	Mike Faulkner	RTD	7 (10)	May 7, 1993	Sands Hotel and Casino, Paradise, Nevada, U.S.	
48	Win	37–11	Dan Murphy	TKO	3 (10)	Jan 30, 1993	The Pyramid, Memphis, Tennessee, U.S.	
47	Win	36–11	Kevin P Porter	TKO	8 (10)	Dec 13, 1992	The Mirage, Paradise, Nevada, U.S.	
46	Loss	35–11	Francesco Damiani	UD	10	Sep 12, 1992	Thomas & Mack Center, Paradise, Nevada, U.S.	
45	Win	35–10	James Smith	UD	10	Jun 26, 1992	CSU Convocation Center, Cleveland, Ohio, U.S.	
44	Loss	34–10	Donovan Ruddock	RTD	8 (10), 3:00	Feb 15, 1992	The Mirage, Paradise, Nevada, U.S.	
43	Win	34–9	Joey Christjohn	TKO	1 (10)	Nov 29, 1991	The Mirage, Paradise, Nevada, U.S.	
42	Win	33–9	Fred Whitaker	KO	2	Jun 8, 1991	Civic Arena, St. Joseph, Missouri, U.S.	
41	Win	32–9	Mark Young	TKO	3 (8), 2:28	Mar 18, 1991	The Mirage, Paradise, Nevada, U.S.	
40	Loss	31–9	Mark Wills	TKO	6 (10), 1:34	May 19, 1990	Caesars Palace, Paradise, Nevada, U.S.	
39	Win	31–8	Martis Fleming	TKO	1 (10), 1:36	Mar 17, 1990	Las Vegas Hilton, Winchester, Nevada, U.S.	
38	Win	30–8	Charles Woolard	KO	2	Jul 21, 1989	Convention Hall, Atlantic City, New Jersey, U.S.	
37	Win	29–8	Harry Terrell	TKO	2 (10)	May 12, 1989	Fieldhouse, Struthers, Ohio, U.S.	
36	Loss	28–8	Orlin Norris	UD	12	Apr 25, 1989	Showboat Hotel and Casino, Las Vegas, Nevada, U.S.	For NABF heavyweight title
35	Win	28–7	David Mauney	KO	1	Mar 24, 1989	Louisville, Kentucky, U.S.	
34	Loss	27–7	Joe Bugner	UD	10	Jul 24, 1987	Entertainment Centre, Sydney, Australia	
33	Win	27–6	James Broad	MD	10	May 30, 1987	Las Vegas Hilton, Winchester, Nevada, U.S.	
32	Win	26–6	Jerry Halstead	KO	8	Nov 22, 1986	Las Vegas Hilton, Winchester, Nevada, U.S.	
31	Loss	25–6	Mark Wills	RTD	9 (10), 3:00	Jun 12, 1986	Forum, Inglewood, California, U.S.	
30	Win	25–5	Funso Banjo	DQ	8 (10)	Apr 30, 1986	Picketts Lock Stadium, London, England	
29	Loss	24–5	Buster Douglas	UD	10	Jan 17, 1986	Omni Coliseum, Atlanta, Georgia, U.S.	
28	Loss	24–4	Tony Tubbs	UD	15	Apr 29, 1985	Memorial Auditorium, Buffalo, New York, U.S.	Lost WBA heavyweight title
27	Win	24–3	Gerrie Coetzee	KO	8 (15), 3:03	Dec 1, 1984	Superbowl, Sun City, Bophuthatswana	Won WBA heavyweight title
26	Loss	23–3	David Bey	UD	12	Aug 31, 1984	Riviera, Winchester, Nevada, U.S.	Lost USBA heavyweight title
25	Loss	23–2	Tim Witherspoon	MD	12	Mar 9, 1984	Las Vegas Convention Center, Winchester, Nevada, U.S.	For vacant WBC heavyweight title
24	Win	23–1	Rick Kellar	TKO	2	Oct 15, 1983	James L. Knight Convention Center, Miami, Florida, U.S.	
23	Win	22–1	Renaldo Snipes	UD	12	May 20, 1983	Dunes, Paradise, Nevada, U.S.	Retained USBA heavyweight title
22	Win	21–1	Larry Frazier	UD	10	Feb 12, 1983	Public Hall, Cleveland, Ohio, U.S.	
21	Win	20–1	James Tillis	TKO	8 (12), 0:43	Nov 26, 1982	Astrodome, Houston, Texas, U.S.	Retained USBA heavyweight title
20	Loss	19–1	Trevor Berbick	UD	10	Jun 11, 1982	Caesars Palace, Paradise, Nevada, U.S.	
19	Win	19–0	Jimmy Young	UD	12	May 2, 1982	Playboy Hotel and Casino, Atlantic City, New Jersey, U.S.	Retained USBA heavyweight title
18	Win	18–0	Scott LeDoux	TKO	4 (12), 0:10	Dec 11, 1981	Queen Elizabeth Sports Centre, Nassau, Bahamas	Retained USBA heavyweight title
17	Win	17–0	George Chaplin	SD	12	Aug 22, 1981	Steel Pier, Atlantic City, New Jersey, U.S.	Retained USBA heavyweight title
16	Win	16–0	Alfredo Evangelista	KO	2 (10), 0:40	Jun 12, 1981	Joe Louis Arena, Detroit, Michigan, U.S.	
15	Win	15–0	Marty Monroe	RTD	5 (12), 3:00	Apr 11, 1981	Concord Resort Hotel, Thompson, New York, U.S.	Retained USBA heavyweight title
14	Win	14–0	Stan Ward	RTD	7 (12), 3:00	Feb 7, 1981	Steel Pier, Atlantic City, New Jersey, U.S.	Won vacant USBA heavyweight title
13	Win	13–0	Dave Johnson	TKO	6 (10), 1:51	Oct 2, 1980	Madison Square Garden, New York City, New York, U.S.	
12	Win	12–0	Leroy Boone	TKO	6 (10)	Sep 12, 1980	Louisville Gardens, Louisville, Kentucky, U.S.	
11	Win	11–0	Larry Alexander	KO	6 (10)	May 16, 1980	Rupp Arena, Lexington, Kentucky, U.S.	
10	Win	10–0	George Chaplin	MD	10	Apr 5, 1980	Louisville Gardens, Louisville, Kentucky, U.S.	
9	Win	9–0	Clayman Parker	KO	1 (10), 3:09	Mar 8, 1980	The Aladdin, Paradise, Nevada, U.S.	
8	Win	8–0	Victor Rodriguez	KO	3 (8), 2:45	Feb 1, 1980	Louisville Gardens, Louisville, Kentucky, U.S.	
7	Win	7–0	Ira Martin	TKO	1 (6), 1:03	Dec 14, 1979	Convention Hall, Atlantic City, New Jersey, U.S.	
6	Win	6–0	James Reid	KO	1 (8), 1:52	Nov 24, 1979	Metropolitan Sports Center, Bloomington, Minnesota, U.S.	
5	Win	5–0	Frank Brown	TKO	3 (8), 0:50	Oct 18, 1979	Convention Hall, Philadelphia, Pennsylvania, U.S.	
4	Win	4–0	Oliver Philipps	TKO	4 (8), 2:11	Sep 22, 1979	Memorial Sports Arena, Los Angeles, California, U.S.	
3	Win	3–0	James Knox	KO	2 (4)	Aug 19, 1979	Metropolitan Sports Center, Bloomington, Minnesota, U.S.	
2	Win	2–0	Jerry McIntyre	KO	1 (4), 0:52	Jun 1, 1979	Commonwealth Convention Center, Louisville, Kentucky, U.S.	
1	Win	1–0	Don Martin	KO	2 (6), 0:36	Feb 16, 1979	Commonwealth Convention Center, Louisville, Kentucky, U.S.	

== Titles in boxing ==
Major World titles

- WBA heavyweight champion (200+ lbs)

Regional/International titles

- USBA heavyweight champion (200+ lbs)

Sporting positions
Amateur boxing titles
Previous: Marvin Stinson	U.S. heavyweight champion 1977, 1978	Next: Tony Tubbs
Regional boxing titles
Vacant Title last held by Mike Weaver	USBA heavyweight champion February 7, 1981 – August 31, 1984	Succeeded by David Bey
World boxing titles
Preceded by Gerrie Coetzee	WBA heavyweight champion December 1, 1984 – April 29, 1985	Succeeded by Tony Tubbs
