= Larry Holmes vs. Tim Witherspoon =

Boxing match

The Crown Affair
- Date: 20 May 1983
- Venue: Dunes Hotel and Casino, Las Vegas, Nevada
- Title(s) on the line: WBC and The Ring Heavyweight Championship

Tale of the tape
Boxer	Larry Holmes	Tim Witherspoon
Nickname	The Easton Assassin	Terrible
Hometown	Easton, Pennsylvania, U.S.	Philadelphia, Pennsylvania, U.S.
Purse	$2,100,000	$250,000
Pre-fight record	42–0 (30 KO)	15–0 (11 KO)
Age	33 years, 6 months	25 years, 4 months
Height	6 ft 3 in (191 cm)	6 ft 3 1/2 in (192 cm)
Weight	213 lb (97 kg)	219 1/2 lb (100 kg)
Style	Orthodox	Orthodox
Recognition	WBC and The Ring; Heavyweight Champion	WBC; No. 3 Ranked Heavyweight; The Ring; No. 10 Ranked Heavyweight

Result
- Holmes wins via 12-round split decision (118–111, 115–113, 114–115)

Larry Holmes vs. Tim Witherspoon, billed as The Crown Affair, was a professional boxing match contested on 20 May 1983, for the WBC and The Ring heavyweight championship.

== Background ==
Having made 14 consecutive defences of his heavyweight title, the longest uninterrupted heavyweight reign since Joe Louis, Larry Holmes having fought once already in 1983 (a one sided win against former European champion Lucien Rodriguez) agreed to face the undefeated Tim Witherspoon.

The event was billed as the world's first ever Heavyweight championship double header, with Michael Dokes making the first defence of his WBA belt in a rematch with Mike Weaver, after their first bout ended in a controversial first round stoppage.

Holmes, who was a 6 to 1 on favourite with bookies, predicted he would knock out the underdog, saying that he "wasn't qualified to be in the same ring with me".

== The fights ==
=== Undercard ===
On the undercard Greg Page defeated Renaldo Snipes in a WBC Heavyweight Title Eliminator, and Ossie Ocasio successfully defended his WBA cruiserweight title.

=== Dokes vs Weaver II ===
In the co-feature for the WBA championship, Dokes and Weaver engaged in an entertaining slugfest that went the full 15 rounds. When the scorecards for this bout were read, judge Jerry Roth had the fight 145-141 for Dokes, but judges Larry Hazzard and Harold Lederman scored the bout a draw at 144-144 and 143-143, respectively, resulting in a majority draw and Dokes retaining the title. It was the first time in 69 years, dating back to the contest between Jack Johnson and Battling Jim Johnson in December 1913, that a world Heavyweight championship contest resulted in a draw.

=== Main Event ===
Witherspoon appeared to land a greater number of hard shots than the champion. In the ninth round, a right hand to the side of the head early, had Holmes in trouble. A left hook-right hand combination sent the champion into the ropes, where Witherspoon launched a barrage of punches in an attempt to finish the fight but Holmes was able to survive the round.

At the end of 12 rounds, judge Herb Santos scored the bout 115–114 for Witherspoon, judge Chuck Hassett scored it 118–111 and judge Chuck Minker had it 115–113 both in favour of the champion, giving Holmes a split decision. The AP scored it for Holmes 115–113, while KO Magazine had it 114–114.

== Aftermath ==
The crowd booed the decision, many clearing feeling with Witherspoon deserved the victory. Witherspoon himself would say post match "I definitely thought I won. He's a great champion, but I think I'm better. I know I am." Holmes acknowledged it was a tougher fight than he was expecting, saying "Witherspoon had more than I thought he did. Or maybe I'm just going down a little bit. A couple of fights ago, the man wouldn't have worn my socks."

== Undercard ==
Confirmed bouts:

- Ossie Ocasio W15 Randy Stephens
  - Retained WBA world cruiserweight title
- Greg Page W12 Renaldo Snipes

== Broadcasting ==
Country	Broadcaster
Australia	Seven Network
Canada	Superchannel
Mexico	Televisa
Philippines	MBS 4
Puerto Rico	Canal 2
United Kingdom	ITV
United States	ABC

Preceded by vs. Lucien Rodriguez	Larry Holmes's bouts 20 May 1983	Succeeded by vs. Scott Frank
Preceded by vs. Renaldo Snipes	Tim Witherspoon's bouts 20 May 1983	Succeeded by vs. Floyd Cummings
Awards
Preceded by Wilfredo Gómez vs. Lupe Pintor; Round 3	The Ring Round of the Year; Round 9; 1983	Succeeded by Juan Meza vs. Jaime Garza; Round 1
