= Scott Frank (boxer) =

American professional boxer (born 1958)

Personal information
- Nationality: American
- Born: Oakland, New Jersey, U.S.
- Height: 6 ft 2 in (188 cm)

Boxing career
- Weight class: Heavyweight
- Reach: 75 in (191 cm)
- Stance: Orthodox

Boxing record
- Total fights: 24
- Wins: 22
- Win by KO: 16
- Losses: 1
- Draws: 1

Scott Frank (born 1958) is an American former professional boxer in the Heavyweight division. He is most famous for his 1983 attempt at becoming world Heavyweight champion. Frank, who claimed he had no plans for a long boxing career, was undefeated in 21 bouts when he personally called World Boxing Council world heavyweight champion Larry Holmes to ask for a championship fight.

Frank is from Oakland, New Jersey, where he attended Indian Hills High School.

== Amateur career ==
Frank first organized bouts in his neighborhood with other kids at his house when his parents were not present; he would charge patrons 50 cents each to watch and, with an average of 100 attendees coming to his house to watch the bouts, the two fighters, of which Frank was one of them, would earn $50; Frank would get $35. He was able to earn $140 before his parents found out about the fights.

Frank began training as a boxer at age 17, visiting the Tony Ryles A.C. gym, then Lou Duva's gym. Duva introduced him to Chiky Ferrara, a well-known boxing trainer from Gleason's gym in New York City. Under Ferrara and Duva's watch, Frank had an award-winning amateur boxing career, winning the New Jersey Open Class Golden Gloves heavyweight championship in 1977 and the AAU heavyweight championship. He was once showcased on ABC-TV's Wide World of Sports. Frank won 25 and lost 3 of his 28 amateur boxing bouts.

== Professional career ==
He debuted as a professional on 2 May 1978, defeating 32-fight veteran Joe Maye over six rounds, dropping him in round five, at Totowa, New Jersey.

Frank won three more fights before facing Chuck Wepner, who had famously faced Muhammad Ali for the world heavyweight title before and who was allegedly the inspiration for the Rocky Balboa character. On 26 September 1978, Frank won the New Jersey state heavyweight title by beating Wepner, who had won 36, lost 13 and drawn (tied) 2 of his 51 previous fights, beating Wepner by a twelve-rounds unanimous decision at Totowa. On 13 March 1979, Frank retained that title by beating Guy Casale, who had won 10, lost 1 and drawn 3 of his 14 contests, by a ninth-round technical knockout at Totowa.

On 8 January 1980, Frank faced Ron Stander in another Totowa program; this one headlined by a fight featuring Frank's gym-mate Rocky Lockridge. Stander had faced Joe Frazier for the world heavyweight title in 1972, losing to the champion by a fifth-round technical knockout. Frank beat Stander so severely, that the fight was stopped after round one by medical advice, giving Frank a first-round technical-knockout win.

Frank's next major fight came against the 22 wins, 1 loss Renaldo Snipes as the secondary fight of a program whose main event was Aaron Pryor's defense of his World Boxing Association world Junior Welterweight title against Miguel Montilla on 21 March 1982 at the Playboy Hotel and Casino in Atlantic City. Snipes had dropped Larry Holmes before losing to him in a fight for Holmes' WBC world heavyweight title on the previous October. Frank and Snipes fought to a ten-rounds draw (tie).

Now ranked among the top ten in the world among the heavyweights by the WBC, Frank faced the 23 wins, 4 losses Steve Zouski at the Ice World in Totowa, on 26 January 1983. Zouski also faced Mike Tyson and George Foreman, among others, in his career. Against Zouski, Frank won by ten-rounds unanimous decision.

=== World championship fight ===
Frank attempted to become the WBC world Heavyweight champion when he challenged WBC champion Larry Holmes for the title. Frank was attempting to become the first White boxer to be heavyweight champion since Ingemar Johansson achieved the feat by defeating Floyd Patterson in 1960. The bout between Holmes and Frank came about because Frank, who was ranked in the top ten among heavyweights by the WBC, placed a call to Holmes' house to talk about a fight between the two.

Holmes dominated Frank until the fight was stopped by referee Tony Perez in round five. Frank was dropped with a right uppercut-left hook combination, Frank later claiming that Holmes thumbed him on the eye with that combination. Holmes later apologized in case he did accidentally thumb Frank.

Just two weeks later, Gerrie Coetzee of South Africa achieved what Frank could not do, becoming the first White world heavyweight champion in 23 years by beating Michael Dokes for the WBA heavyweight title.

=== Rest of career ===
True to his promise, Frank retired after the Holmes title fight. He briefly returned in 1987 for a fight against 2 wins. 20 losses Stan Johnson on 25 May at Alexandria, Virginia, which he won by first-round knockout, and then, in 1997 when, on 1 May, he defeated the 10 wins, 2 losses prospect, Derek Amos, by a fifth-round technical knockout at the Asbury Park, New Jersey convention center.

== Professional boxing record ==
30 fights	28 wins	1 loss
By knockout	22	1
By decision	6	0
Draws	1	

No.	Result	Record	Opponent	Type	Round, time	Date	Location	Notes
24	Win	22-1-1	Derek Amos	TKO	5	May 1, 1997	Asbury Park, NJ, U.S.	
23	Win	21–1–1	Stan Johnson	TKO	1	May 23, 1987	Crystal City, VA, U.S.	
22	Loss	21–0–1	Larry Holmes	TKO	5	Sept 10, 1983	Atlantic City, New Jersey, U.S.	For WBC heavyweight title
21	Win	20–0–1	Ken Arlt	UD	10	Jul 14, 1983	Totowa, New Jersey, U.S.	
20	Win	19–0–1	Steve Zouski	UD	10	Jan 26, 1983	Totowa, New Jersey, U.S.	
19	Win	18-0-1	Mike Jameson	UD	10	Dec 22, 1982	Stateline, Nevada, U.S.	
18	Win	17-0-1	Mark Lee	KO	4	Nov,22 1982	Atlantic City, New Jersey, U.S.	
17	Draw	16-0-1	Renaldo Snipes	MD	10	Mar 21, 1982	Atlantic City, New Jersey, U.S.	
16	Win	16-0	Johnny Blaine	KO	2	Aug 21, 1981	Elizabeth, New Jersey, U.S.	
15	Win	15-0	Eddie Mallard	TKO	3	June 30, 1981	Atlantic City, New Jersey, U.S.	Retained USA New Jersey State heavyweight title
14	Win	14-0	Al Brookes	TKO	2	Feb 28, 1981	Atlantic City, New Jersey, U.S.	
13	Win	13-0	Randy Willis	KO	1	Nov 20, 1980	Totowa, New Jersey, U.S.	
12	Win	12-0	CJ Bar Brown	KO	2	Feb 19, 1980	Totowa, New Jersey, U.S.	
11	Win	11-0	Ron Stander	TKO	1	Jan 8, 1980	Totowa, New Jersey, U.S.	
10	Win	10-0	Bill Connell	KO	8	Sept 8, 1979	East Rutherford, New Jersey, U.S.	Retained USA New Jersey State heavyweight title
9	Win	9-0	Don Martin	KO	4	July 31, 1979	Totowa, New Jersey, U.S.	
8	Win	8-0	James Reid	UD	8	Apr 11, 1979	White Plains, New York U.S.	
7	Win	7-0	Guy Casale	TKO	9	Mar 13, 1979	Totowa, New Jersey, U.S.	Retained USA New Jersey State heavyweight title
6	Win	6-0	Charlie Harris	TKO	3	Nov 14, 1978	Totowa, New Jersey, U.S.	
5	Win	5-0	Chuck Wepner	UD	12	Sep 26, 1978	Totowa, New Jersey, U.S.	Won USA New Jersey State heavyweight title
4	Win	4-0	John McGrath	KO	2	Aug 30, 1978	Paramus, New Jersey U.S.	
3	Win	3-0	Robert Colay	TKO	3	June 20, 1978	Trenton New Jersey, U.S.	
2	Win	2-0	Johnny Blaine	KO	1	June 13, 1978	Totowa, New Jersey, U.S.	
1	Win	1-0	Joe Maye	UD	6	May 2, 1978	Totowa, New Jersey, U.S.	

== Retirement ==
Frank retired from boxing with 24 professional fights, of which he won 22, lost 1 and drew 1, with 16 wins and the Holmes loss being by knockout.

On 14 November 2002, he was inducted into the New Jersey Boxing Hall of Fame.
