= Renaldo Snipes =

American boxer

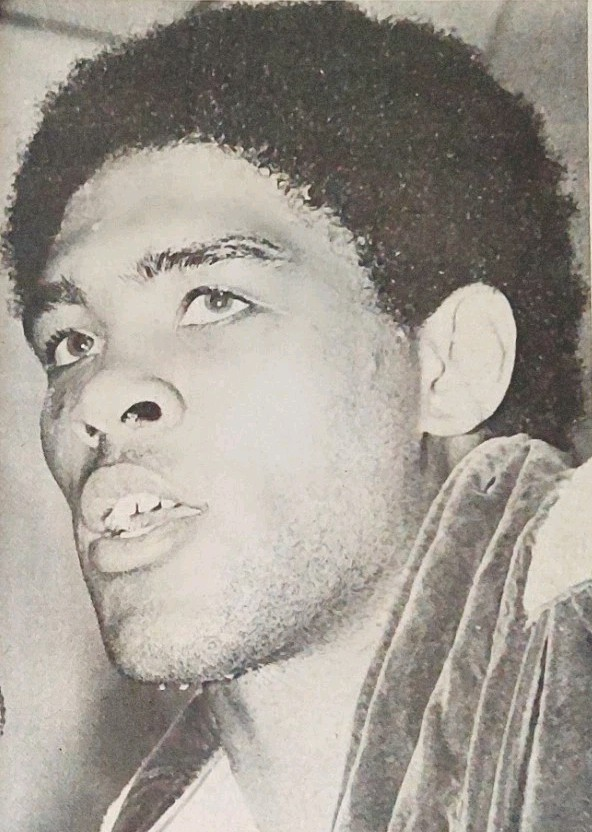
- Snipes c. 1982

Personal information
- Nickname: Mr. Snipes
- Nationality: American
- Born: Reenaold Snipes; August 15, 1956 (age 70) Houston, Texas, U.S.
- Height: 6 ft 2 in (1.88 m)
- Weight: Heavyweight

Boxing career
- Reach: 78 in (198 cm)
- Stance: Orthodox

Boxing record
- Total fights: 48
- Wins: 39
- Win by KO: 22
- Losses: 8
- Draws: 1

Renaldo Snipes (born Reenaold Snipes on August 15, 1956) is an American retired professional boxer. He unsuccessfully challenged Larry Holmesfor the world heavyweight championship in 1981. He notably took victories over Heavyweight Boxing Champions Trevor Berbick and Gerrie Coetzee as well as a win over contender Johnny du Plooy.

== Amateur career ==
Snipes was a two-time Chicago Golden Gloves Champion (1977 and 1978). He lost on a first-round stoppage to future heavyweight contender Eddie Gregg in the 1978 Intercity match-ups between Chicago and New York Golden Glove winners.

== Professional career ==
Nicknamed "Mister" Snipes, Snipes started off his career successfully, with a first-round knockout of Carl Halliburton. That fight was on the same card on which future heavyweight contender James Tillis made his debut. 21 more wins followed, and he challenged world heavyweight champion Larry Holmes for the title November 6, 1981 in Pittsburgh. Snipes knocked down the champion in the seventh round. However Holmes got up and Snipes was stopped in Round 11. Snipes complained that Holmes was the beneficiary of a long count. Films show, however, that the claim is exaggerated; Holmes rose at the count of 4 and though badly hurt, fought off the charging Snipes for the remainder of the round. Snipes fought a string of world-class fighters after the Holmes bout, in contests that mostly descended into wildly entertaining brawls. He amassed a record of 39 wins (22 by knockout), 8 losses, and 1 draw. In his career he fought boxers Larry Holmes, Trevor Berbick, Gerrie Coetzee, Tim Witherspoon, Greg Page, Eddie Mustafa Muhammad, Alfredo Evangelista, Rickey Parkey, South African puncher Johnny DuPlooy and many more.

Snipes had been in the frame for a big money fight with Mike Tyson in 1990, however he broke his right hand in a fight with rugged journeyman Jamie Howe and lost out on the opportunity, which later went to Alex Stewart. The injury and rehabilitation took him out for two years, and when he returned in June 1992 (aged 36) he fought then-dangerous Garing Lane, surviving an 8th-round knockdown to score a split decision win. He knocked out Eddie Curry (not to be confused with Eddy Curry, the NBA basketball player) the following year before being matched with heavily hyped undefeated Cuban giant Jorge Luis Gonzalez on the high-profile Bowe/Holyfield II undercard. At 37, Snipes struggled with the bigger younger man, and after a gallant effort was stopped with less than a minute remaining in the 10th and final round, after a knockdown, with the stoppage being announced to be because of cuts, much to his disgust.

In 1993 former mobster Sammy Gravano testified under oath that in the late 80s he attempted to arrange a fixed fight between Snipes and undefeated WBO champion Francesco Damiani, who Gravano alleged was associated with an organized crime family in Italy. The winner (Snipes) would fight Tyson, however Damiani lost his fight with Ray Mercer before the Snipes bout and that put him out of the picture for a major fight.

== Professional boxing record ==
39 Wins (22 knockouts, 17 decisions), 8 Losses (2 knockouts, 6 decisions), 1 Draw Archived April 25, 2014, at the Wayback Machine
Result	Record	Opponent	Type	Round	Date	Location	Notes
Loss	39–8–1	(Cuba) Jorge Luis Gonzalez	TKO	10	06/11/1993	(United States) Caesars Palace, Las Vegas, Nevada, U.S.	Referee stopped the bout at 2:15 of the tenth round.
Win	39–7–1	(United States) Eddie Curry	KO	3	24/06/1993	(United States) Paramount Theater, New York City, U.S.	
Win	38–7–1	(United States) Garing Lane	SD	10	26/06/1992	(United States) King Street Palace, Charleston, South Carolina, U.S.	
Win	37–7–1	(United States) Jamie Howe	PTS	10	18/05/1990	(United States) Callicoon, New York, U.S.	
Win	36–7–1	(United States) Tim Adams	TKO	3	26/12/1989	(United States) Memphis, Tennessee, U.S.	
Win	35–7–1	(United States) Melvin Epps	PTS	10	14/09/1989	(United States) Beacon Theatre and Hotel, New York City, U.S.	
Win	34–7–1	(Brazil) Manoel De Almeida	TKO	10	11/05/1989	(United States) Felt Forum, New York City, U.S.	Almeida knocked out at 0:24 of the tenth round.
Win	33–7–1	(United States) Andre Crowder	TKO	3	30/03/1989	(United States) Felt Forum, New York City, U.S.	
Win	32–7–1	(United States) Lionel Washington	TKO	4	15/12/1988	(United States) Felt Forum, New York City, U.S.	Referee stopped the bout at 2:38 of the fourth round.
Win	31–7–1	(South Africa) Johnny DuPlooy	TKO	7	12/08/1988	(United States) Eagles Club, Milwaukee, Wisconsin, U.S.	
Win	30–7–1	(United States) Terry Armstrong	TKO	8	16/06/1988	(United States) Felt Forum, New York City, U.S.	
Loss	29–7–1	(United States) Orlin Norris	UD	12	19 Mar 1988	(United States) Caesars Palace, Las Vegas, Nevada, U.S.	NABF Heavyweight Title.
Win	29–6–1	(United States) Terry Anderson	KO	10	23/07/1987	(United States) Felt Forum, New York City, U.S.	Anderson knocked out at 2:40 of the tenth round.
Win	28–6–1	(United States) Richard Earl Scott	UD	10	04/06/1987	(United States) Felt Forum, New York City, U.S.	
Win	27–6–1	(United States) Melvin Epps	TKO	5	09/04/1987	(United States) Felt Forum, New York City, U.S.	Referee stopped the bout at 1:14 of the fifth round.
Loss	26–6–1	(United States) Tyrell Biggs	UD	10	12/12/1986	(United States) Madison Square Garden, New York City, U.S.	
Win	26–5–1	(United States) Donnie Long	UD	10	17/08/1986	(United States) Trump Plaza Hotel and Casino, Atlantic City, New Jersey, U.S.	
Win	25–5–1	(United States) Dennis Fikes	KO	2	24/07/1986	(United States) Felt Forum, New York City, U.S.	Fikes knocked out at 0:55 of the second round.
Win	24–5–1	(United States) Bobby Crabtree	KO	5	10/07/1986	(United States) Felt Forum, New York City, U.S.	Crabtree knocked out at 1:21 of the fifth round.
Loss	23–5–1	(United States) Ricky Parkey	SD	10	30/10/1984	(United States) Tropicana Hotel & Casino, Atlantic City, New Jersey, U.S.	
Loss	23–4–1	(Uruguay) Alfredo Evangelista	SD	10	23/09/1983	Richfield Coliseum, Richfield, Ohio, U.S.	
Loss	23–3–1	(United States) Greg Page	UD	12	20/05/1983	(United States) Dunes Hotel, Las Vegas, Nevada, U.S.	IBF USBA Heavyweight Title.
Win	23–2–1	(Canada) Trevor Berbick	PTS	10	02/10/1982	(United States) Sands Atlantic City, Atlantic City, New Jersey, U.S.	
Loss	22–2–1	(United States) Tim Witherspoon	MD	10	05/06/1982	(United States) Caesars Palace, Las Vegas, Nevada, U.S.	
Draw	22–1–1	(United States) Scott Frank	PTS	10	21/03/1982	(United States) Playboy Hotel and Casino, Atlantic City, New Jersey, U.S.	
Loss	22–1	(United States) Larry Holmes	TKO	11	06/11/1981	Pittsburgh Civic Arena, Pittsburgh, Pennsylvania, U.S.	WBC World Heavyweight Title. Referee stopped the bout at 1:05 of the 11th round.
Win	22–0	(South Africa) Gerrie Coetzee	SD	10	09/08/1981	(United States) New Westchester Theater, Tarrytown, New York, U.S.	
Win	21–0	(United States) Eddie Mustafa Muhammad	SD	10	17/05/1981	(United States) Bally's Atlantic City, Atlantic City, New Jersey, U.S.	
Win	20–0	(United States) Floyd Cummings	UD	10	08/03/1981	(United States) Resorts Atlantic City, Atlantic City, New Jersey, U.S.	
Win	19–0	(United States) Leroy Boone	PTS	10	21/01/1981	(United States) Westchester County Center, White Plains, New York, U.S.	
Win	18–0	(United States) Dwain Bonds	KO	8	17/12/1980	(United States) Westchester County Center, White Plains, New York, U.S.	
Win	17–0	(United States) Malik Dozier	KO	5	25/11/1980	(United States) Boston, Massachusetts, U.S.	
Win	16–0	(United States) Rodell Dupree	KO	3	18/10/1980	(United States) Atlantic City Convention Center, Atlantic City, New Jersey, U.S.	
Win	15–0	(United States) Larry Alexander	KO	2	17/09/1980	(United States) Westchester County Center, White Plains, New York, U.S.	
Win	14–0	(United States) Robert Colay	KO	1	09/08/1980	(United States) Superstar Theatre, Atlantic City, New Jersey, U.S.	
Win	13–0	(United States) Johnny Warr	PTS	8	11/06/1980	(United States) Westchester County Center, White Plains, New York, U.S.	
Win	12–0	(United States) James Reid	KO	3	14/05/1980	(United States) Westchester County Center, White Plains, New York, U.S.	
Win	11–0	(United States) Dave Johnson	PTS	8	16/04/1980	(United States) Westchester County Center, White Plains, New York, U.S.	
Win	10–0	(United States) Tyrone Harlee	KO	4	05/12/1979	(United States) Westchester County Center, White Plains, New York, U.S.	
Win	9–0	(United States) Mike Tarasewich	PTS	8	10/10/1979	(United States) Westchester County Center, White Plains, New York, U.S.	
Win	8–0	(United States) Eugene Green	PTS	6	08/07/1979	(United States) Felt Forum, New York City, U.S.	
Win	7–0	(United States) "Young" Charles Cox	PTS	6	20/06/1979	(United States) Westchester County Center, White Plains, New York, U.S.	
Win	6–0	(United States) Barry "Fighting Postman" Funches	KO	3	23/05/1979	(United States) Westchester County Center, White Plains, New York, U.S.	
Win	5–0	(United States) Dave Smith	KO	3	11/04/1979	(United States) Westchester County Center, White Plains, New York, U.S.	
Win	4–0	"Inspector" Ron Hope	PTS	4	14/03/1979	(United States) Westchester County Center, White Plains, New York, U.S.	
Win	3–0	(United States) Sam Miller	KO	3	14/02/1979	(United States) Westchester County Center, White Plains, New York, U.S.	
Win	2–0	Hal Emerson	PTS	4	15/12/1978	(United States) Westchester County Center, White Plains, New York, U.S.	
Win	1–0	(United States) Carl Halliburton	KO	1	18/11/1978	(United States) DePaul University Alumni Hall, Chicago, Illinois, U.S.	

== Life after boxing ==
April 30, 2017 Inducted into the New York Boxing Hall of fame.

Snipes currently resides in New York City. He currently is involved in numerous charity fund-raising projects and was awarded the "Ring 8 2012 Community Service Award". He was inducted into the New Jersey Boxing Hall of Fame on Nov 1, 2006 and the New York State Boxing Hall of Fame on April 30, 2017.
