= Bernardo Mercado =

Colombian boxer (1952–2021)

Personal information
- Nationality: Colombian
- Born: Bernardo Mercado; January 16, 1952 Montería, Colombia
- Died: June 11, 2021 (aged 69) Cartagena
- Height: 6 ft 4 in (193 cm)
- Weight: Heavyweight

Boxing career
- Stance: Orthodox

Boxing record
- Total fights: 38
- Wins: 33
- Win by KO: 28
- Losses: 5
- Draws: 0
Medal record
Men's amateur boxing
Representing Colombia
Central American and Caribbean Games
Bronze medal – third place	1974 Santo Domingo	Light-heavyweight

Bernardo Mercado (January 16, 1952 – June 11, 2021) was a Colombian professional boxer briefly ranked as the top contender for the title of champion in 1980 by the WBC.

Born in Montería, Colombia, Mercado won a bronze medal in the light-heavyweight category at the 1974 Central American and Caribbean Games.

Mercado was once a sparring partner for Argentine heavyweight Oscar Bonavena, before turning professional on November 15, 1975.

Of his first 20 bouts, the 6-foot-4-inch (193 cm) power puncher won 17 by knockout, nine in the first round. Mercado's first loss as a pro came in 1978, at the hands of future champion "Big" John Tate.

He went on to fight other future champions Mike Weaver and Trevor Berbick, knocking Berbick out in the first round of their meeting on April 3, 1979. In 1980, he earned a seventh-round technical knockout over dangerous contender and multiple-time world title challenger Earnie Shavers and was ranked as the number one contender to Larry Holmes' WBC belt. He was defeated in an elimination bout with former champion Leon Spinks by 9-round technical knockout. He would go on to fight such name fighters as Randall "Tex" Cobb and Jimmy Thunder (with whom he fought in his last bout on December 8, 1989).

== Professional boxing record ==
33 Wins (28 knockouts, 5 decisions), 5 Losses (4 knockouts, 1 decision)
Result	Record	Opponent	Type	Round	Date	Location	Notes
Loss	33–5	(New Zealand) Jimmy Thunder	TKO	1	08/12/1989	(Australia) Melbourne Showgrounds, Melbourne, Victoria	Referee stopped the bout at 1:27 of the first round.
Win	33–4	(United States) Wesley Watson	TKO	1	13/08/1988	(United States) Bristol, Tennessee	
Win	32–4	(United States) Wesley Smith	KO	4	02/08/1988	(United States) Central Plaza Hotel, Oklahoma City, Oklahoma	
Win	31–4	(Canada) Conroy Nelson	UD	8	28/05/1988	(Canada) Saskatoon Place Complex, Saskatoon, Saskatchewan	
Win	30–4	(Mexico) Jose Luis Gonzalez	KO	1	06/11/1986	(United States) Olympic Auditorium, Los Angeles, California	
Win	29–4	(Mexico) Fernando Montes	TKO	8	04/09/1986	(United States) Olympic Auditorium, Los Angeles, California	Referee stopped the bout at 3:00 of the eighth round.
Win	28–4	(Mexico) Fernando Montes	TKO	5	07/05/1983	(Colombia) Cartagena de Indias	
Loss	27–4	(United States) Randall "Tex" Cobb	PTS	10	06/11/1981	(United States) Pittsburgh Civic Arena, Pittsburgh, Pennsylvania	
Win	27–3	(Costa Rica) Gilberto Acuna	TKO	1	13/06/1981	(United States) Miami Beach Convention Center, Miami Beach, Florida	
Loss	26–3	(United States) Leon Spinks	TKO	9	02/10/1980	(United States) Caesars Palace, Las Vegas, Nevada	Referee stopped the bout at 2:52 of the ninth round.
Win	26–2	(United States) Tom Prater	TKO	12	14/08/1980	(Colombia) Bogotá	WBC Continental Americas Heavyweight Title.
Win	25–2	(United States) Earnie Shavers	TKO	7	08/03/1980	(United States) Great Gorge Resort, McAfee, New Jersey	Referee stopped the bout at 0:41 of the seventh round.
Win	24–2	(United States) Henry Clark	PTS	10	03/08/1979	(United States) Santa Monica Civic Auditorium, Santa Monica, California	
Win	23–2	(Tonga) Fili Moala	TKO	6	25/05/1979	(United States) San Diego Coliseum, San Diego, California	
Win	22–2	(Jamaica) Trevor Berbick	KO	1	03/04/1979	(Canada) Halifax Metro Centre, Halifax, Nova Scotia	WBC Continental Americas Heavyweight Title. Berbick knocked out at 2:55 of the first round.
Win	21–2	(Tonga) Tony Pulu	TKO	8	14/02/1979	(United States) Salt Palace, Salt Lake City, Utah	
Loss	20–2	(United States) Mike Weaver	TKO	5	22/10/1978	(United States) Sahara Reno, Reno, Nevada	
Loss	20–1	(United States) John Tate	TKO	2	22/06/1978	(United States) Madison Square Garden, New York City	Referee stopped the bout at 2:24 of the second round.
Win	20–0	(United States) Horace Robinson	PTS	10	24/02/1978	(United States) Las Vegas, Nevada	
Win	19–0	(Tonga) Fili Moala	TKO	8	18/11/1977	(United States) Caesars Palace, Las Vegas, Nevada	
Win	18–0	(United States) Roger Russell	KO	1	29/09/1977	(United States) Madison Square Garden, New York City	Russell knocked out at 1:17 of the first round.
Win	17–0	(United States) Battling Bob Smith	KO	2	22/07/1977	(Colombia) Cartagena de Indias	
Win	16–0	(United States) Horace Robinson	PTS	6	11/05/1977	(United States) Madison Square Garden, New York City	
Win	15–0	(United States) Randy Stephens	KO	2	29/04/1977	(United States) Fort Worth, Texas	
Win	14–0	(United States) Dan Ronnell	KO	7	10/03/1977	(United States) Olympic Auditorium, Los Angeles, California	
Win	13–0	(United States) Paul Solomon	KO	1	15/02/1977	(United States) Sacramento Memorial Auditorium, Sacramento, California	
Win	12–0	(Tonga) Johnny Pouha	KO	1	03/11/1976	(United States) Silver Slipper, Las Vegas, Nevada	
Win	11–0	(United States) Dan Ronnell	KO	6	22/10/1976	(United States) Los Angeles, California	
Win	10–0	(Canada) Earl McLeay	TKO	1	05/10/1976	(United States) Hyatt Regency, Incline Village, Nevada	
Win	9–0	(United States) J.J. Woody	KO	3	28/09/1976	(United States) Yankee Stadium, Bronx, New York	
Win	8–0	(United States) Battling Bob Smith	KO	1	22/09/1976	(United States) Las Vegas, Nevada	
Win	7–0	(United States) MacArthur Swindell	UD	8	19/08/1976	(United States) Washoe County Fairgrounds, Reno, Nevada	
Win	6–0	(Mexico) Manuel Ramos	KO	5	13/05/1976	(United States) Albuquerque Civic Auditorium, Albuquerque, New Mexico	
Win	5–0	(United States) Mark White	KO	1	26/02/1976	(United States) Reno, Nevada	
Win	4–0	(United States) Dave Martinez	KO	3	12/02/1976	(United States) Olympic Auditorium, Los Angeles, California	
Win	3–0	(United States) Marlyn Johnson	KO	1	08/01/1976	(United States) Olympic Auditorium, Los Angeles, California	
Win	2–0	(United States) Kenny Charles	TKO	1	11/12/1975	(United States) Olympic Auditorium, Los Angeles, California	Referee stopped the bout at 0:23 of the first round.
Win	1–0	(United States) Harry Washington	KO	1	15/11/1975	(United States) Olympic Auditorium, Los Angeles, California	Washington knocked out at 2:34 of the first round.

== Exhibition boxing record ==
2 fights	0 wins	0 losses
Non-scored	2	

No.	Result	Record	Opponent	Type	Round, time	Date	Location	Notes
2	—N/a	0–0 (2)	(United States) Larry Holmes	—N/a	2	Mar 18, 1990	Jakarta, Indonesia	Non-scored bout
1	—N/a	0–0 (1)	(United States) Muhammad Ali	—N/a	5	Nov 14, 1977	Santamaría Bullring, Bogotá, Colombia	Non-scored bout
