= Scott LeDoux =

American boxer (1949–2011)

Personal information
- Nickname: The Fighting Frenchman
- Nationality: American
- Born: Alan Scott LeDoux; January 7, 1949 Crosby-Ironton, Minnesota, U.S.
- Died: August 11, 2011 (aged 62)
- Height: 6 ft 1 1/2 in (1.87 m)
- Weight: Heavyweight

Boxing career
- Stance: Orthodox

Boxing record
- Total fights: 50
- Wins: 33
- Win by KO: 22
- Losses: 13
- Draws: 4
- No contests: 0

Alan Scott LeDoux (January 7, 1949 – August 11, 2011) was an American professional boxer, professional wrestler, and politician. He competed in the Heavyweight division between 1974 and 1983. He later served as Boxing Commissioner for Minnesota, and Executive Director of the Minnesota Combative Sports Commission.

== Boxing career ==
LeDoux began his professional boxing career in 1974. His first boxing match was a knockout victory over Arthur Pullens, and his final bout in 1983 was a technical knockout loss to Frank Bruno. LeDoux retired from the ring with a record of 33-13-4 (including 22 knockouts). His opponents included Larry Holmes (see: Larry Holmes vs. Scott LeDoux), George Foreman, Ken Norton, Ron Lyle, Gerrie Coetzee, Leon Spinks, Greg Page, Frank Bruno, and Mike Weaver.

In his match with Leon Spinks, LeDoux earned a 'draw', just months before Spinks defeated Ali. He also knocked off broadcaster Howard Cosell's toupee in a scuffle that followed a losing effort with Johnny Boudreaux. LeDoux insisted the fight was fixed by Don King and he told Cosell to "Tell it like it is" mimicking Cosell's famous catch phrase. A pushing match ensued and in the process, Cosell's headset along with his toupee was dislodged by an errant LeDoux shove in front of live ABC cameras. Cosell quickly retrieved his hairpiece from the floor and replaced it on top of his head.

On April 22, 1976, LeDoux lost to fellow Minnesotan Duane Bobick before a crowd of 13,789 at the Metropolitan Sports Center in Bloomington, MN, which is still a Minnesota record. The high point of LeDoux's career were arguably draws scored against Leon Spinks and an aging Ken Norton. Norton won the first eight rounds of the fight, but tired. Although Norton was knocked out in round ten, there was confusion as to whether the ref had signaled the fight over so the match was declared a draw.

LeDoux took part in a five-round exhibition match with Muhammad Ali and was a sparring partner to both Mike Tyson and Lennox Lewis. LeDoux later worked as a ringside commentator for ESPN.

In 2010, LeDoux was elected a member of the inaugural class of inductees to the Minnesota Boxing Hall of Fame.

== Professional wrestling career ==
In 1986, LeDoux went into professional wrestling as a referee for the American Wrestling Association. He would feud with Larry Zbyszko throughout 1986 and 1987.

== Political career ==
LeDoux was elected to the Anoka County, Minnesota Board of County Commissioners and re-elected in 2008, defeating challenger Becky Fink. In 2006, the Minnesota Legislature authorized the creation of a state Boxing Commission, the Minnesota Board of Boxing having gone out of existence in 2001 with the retirement of longtime Boxing Commissioner and Executive Secretary Jimmy O'Hara (LeDoux and O'Hara had served together on the Minnesota Board of Boxing for 18 years). LeDoux was appointed boxing commissioner by the state Governor Tim Pawlenty. In August 2006 LeDoux was also named Executive Director of the Minnesota Combative Sports Commission.

=== Controversies ===
- In 2007, the Chief Executive of the Mille Lacs Band of Ojibwe, Melanie Benjamin, objected to LeDoux's public criticism of her band and their boxing matches at the Grand Casino Hinckley Casino in Hinckley, Minnesota.
- In November 2007, LeDoux was accused by boxing promoter John Hoffman of "insulting and assaulting" him at a boxing event in Maplewood, Minnesota. LeDoux claims that Hoffman was intoxicated and fabricated the story.
- In December 2008 a state investigation revealed that LeDoux, in his capacity as head of the Combative Sports Commission, accepted free tickets to an MMA event, some of which had a face value of $600. This was determined to be a violation of state ethics rules.
- In January 2009, commission member Chad Ridler resigned in protest "of the inaction of the commission in providing oversight of Scott LeDoux...He's unaccountable".

== Personal life ==
LeDoux was a member of the national board of directors of the Wishes and More. He was also honorary chair of the American Cancer Society. He also founded a golf tournament called the Scott LeDoux Long Haul Classic.

=== Death ===
LeDoux was diagnosed with amyotrophic lateral sclerosis (ALS) or "Lou Gehrig's Disease" in August 2008. A 2010 study questioned the diagnosis in athletes who had experienced head trauma or repeated concussions. Instead, the study suggests that some may have a variant of chronic traumatic encephalopathy.

LeDoux died of complication of ALS on August 11, 2011.

== Professional boxing record ==
33 Wins (22 knockouts, 11 decisions), 13 Losses (7 knockouts, 5 decisions), 4 Draws
Result	Record	Opponent	Type	Round	Date	Location	Notes
Loss	33–13–4	(United Kingdom) Frank Bruno	TKO	3	03/05/1983	(United Kingdom) Wembley Arena, Wembley, London	
Win	33–12–4	(United States) Ken Arlt	UD	10	07/04/1983	(United States) Marriott Hotel, Portland, Oregon	
Win	32–12–4	(United States) Larry Ware	TKO	7	28/02/1983	(Canada) Edmonton, Alberta	
Win	31–12–4	Steve Ward	KO	8	13/11/1982	(United States) Gillette, Minnesota	
Win	30–12–4	Marlo Malino	KO	5	27/10/1982	(United States) Schollander Pavilion, West Fargo, North Dakota	
Loss	29–12–4	(Canada) Gordon Racette	SD	10	23/09/1982	(Canada) PNE Agrodome, Vancouver, British Columbia	
Loss	29–11–4	(South Africa) Gerrie Coetzee	KO	8	27/03/1982	(South Africa) Rand Stadium, Johannesburg, Gauteng	
Win	29–10–4	Steve Sanchez	KO	8	25/02/1982	(United States) Sioux Falls, South Dakota	
Loss	28–10–4	(United States) Greg Page	TKO	4	12/11/1981	(The Bahamas) Thomas Robinson Stadium, Nassau, Bahamas	IBF USBA Heavyweight Title.
Win	28–9–4	(United States) Arnold Sam	PTS	10	30/07/1981	(United States) Gillette, Minnesota	
Win	27–9–4	(United States) Reggie Fleming	KO	2	24/04/1981	(United States) Billings, Montana	
Loss	26–9–4	(United States) Larry Holmes	TKO	7	07/07/1980	(United States) Met Center, Bloomington, Minnesota	For WBC heavyweight title
Win	26–8–4	(United States) Marty Monroe	UD	10	09/03/1980	(United States) Saint Paul Civic Center, Saint Paul, Minnesota	
Loss	25–8–4	(United States) Mike Weaver	UD	12	24/11/1979	(United States) Met Center, Bloomington, Minnesota	For IBF USBA Heavyweight Title
Draw	25–7–4	(United States) Ken Norton	PTS	10	19/08/1979	(United States) Met Center, Bloomington, Minnesota	
Loss	25–7–3	(United States) Ron Lyle	SD	10	12/05/1979	(United States) Las Vegas, Nevada	
Win	25–6–3	(United States) James J. Beattie	TKO	3	20/02/1979	(United States) Met Center, Bloomington, Minnesota	
Win	24–6–3	(United States) Joe Donatto	KO	3	15/12/1978	(United States) Omaha Civic Auditorium, Omaha, Nebraska	
Win	23–6–3	(United States) James Brown	KO	2	10/11/1978	(United States) Caesars Palace, Las Vegas, Nevada	
Win	22–6–3	(United States) Sylvester Wilder	KO	2	03/10/1978	(Canada) Winnipeg, Manitoba	
Draw	21–6–3	(United States) Bill Sharkey	PTS	10	26/09/1978	(United States) Miami Beach Convention Center, Miami Beach, Florida	
Draw	21–6–2	(United States) Leon Spinks	PTS	10	22/10/1977	(United States) Aladdin Theatre for the Performing Arts, Las Vegas, Nevada	
Loss	21–6–1	(United States) Duane Bobick	TKO	8	28/07/1977	(United States) Met Center, Bloomington, Minnesota	For Minnesota Heavyweight Title
Win	21–5–1	(United States) Tom Prater	TKO	7	23/06/1977	(United States) Met Center, Bloomington, Minnesota	
Win	20–5–1	(United States) Pedro Soto	SD	10	02/03/1977	(United States) Madison Square Garden, New York City	
Loss	19–5–1	(United States) Johnny Boudreaux	UD	8	13/02/1977	(United States) Halsey Field House, Annapolis, Maryland	
Win	19–4–1	(United States) Rocky Bentley	KO	2	30/11/1976	(United States) Minneapolis, Minnesota	
Loss	18–4–1	(United States) George Foreman	TKO	3	14/08/1976	(United States) Utica Memorial Auditorium, Utica, New York	
Loss	18–3–1	(United States) John Dino Denis	UD	10	26/06/1976	(United States) Providence, Rhode Island	
Loss	18–2–1	(United States) Duane Bobick	UD	10	22/04/1976	(United States) Met Center, Bloomington, Minnesota	For Minnesota Heavyweight Title
Win	18–1–1	(United States) Larry Middleton	PTS	10	09/03/1976	(United States) Minneapolis, Minnesota	
Win	17–1–1	(United States) Bill Carson	KO	9	07/02/1976	(United States) Minneapolis, Minnesota	
Win	16–1–1	(United States) Ron Stander	UD	10	10/12/1975	(United States) Met Center, Bloomington, Minnesota	
Win	15–1–1	(United States) Brian O'Melia	UD	10	23/09/1975	(United States) Saint Paul, Minnesota	
Draw	14–1–1	(United States) George Johnson	PTS	10	14/08/1975	(United States) Saint Paul Civic Center, Saint Paul, Minnesota	Decision for LeDoux overturned due to crowd response.
Win	14–1	(United States) Terry Daniels	TKO	6	08/07/1975	(United States) Orlando Sports Stadium, Orlando, Florida	
Win	13–1	(United States) Rodney Bobick	UD	10	23/04/1975	(United States) Met Center, Bloomington, Minnesota	
Loss	12–1	(United States) Roy Wallace	TKO	2	14/03/1975	(United States) University of Minnesota Armory, Saint Paul, Minnesota	
Win	12–0	(Canada) Larry Renaud	TKO	6	29/01/1975	(United States) Mayo Civic Center, Rochester, Minnesota	
Win	11–0	(United States) CJ Bar Brown	PTS	6	18/01/1975	(United States) Boston Garden, Boston, Massachusetts	
Win	10–0	(United States) John L Johnson	KO	5	22/11/1974	(United States) Minneapolis, Minnesota	
Win	9–0	(United States) Lou Rogan	PTS	10	08/11/1974	(United States) Crosby, Minnesota	
Win	8–0	(United States) Ron Draper	KO	10	08/10/1974	(United States) Minneapolis, Minnesota	
Win	7–0	(United States) Tom Berry	KO	4	13/08/1974	(United States) Minneapolis Convention Center, Minneapolis, Minnesota	
Win	6–0	(United States) Joe Batton	KO	6	31/07/1974	(United States) Met Center, Bloomington, Minnesota	
Win	5–0	(United States) Larry Penniger	KO	5	23/05/1974	(United States) Minneapolis, Minnesota	
Win	4–0	(United States) Reggie Fleming	KO	3	15/05/1974	(United States) Saint Paul Auditorium, Saint Paul, Minnesota	
Win	3–0	Steve Patterson	PTS	6	23/04/1974	(United States) Minneapolis Convention Center, Minneapolis, Minnesota	
Win	2–0	(United States) Floyd Cox	TKO	3	14/03/1974	(United States) Minneapolis Auditorium, Minneapolis, Minnesota	
Win	1–0	(United States) Arthur Pullins	KO	3	04/02/1974	(United States) Minneapolis Convention Center, Minneapolis, Minnesota	

== Exhibition boxing record ==
1 fight	0 wins	0 losses
Non-scored	1	

No.	Result	Record	Opponent	Type	Round, time	Date	Location	Notes
1	—N/a	0–0 (1)	(United States) Muhammad Ali	—N/a	5	Dec 2, 1977	(United States) Auditorium Theatre, Chicago, Illinois, U.S.	Non-scored bout
