= Larry Holmes vs. Randall "Tex" Cobb =

Duel in the Dome
- Date: November 26, 1982
- Venue: Astrodome, Houston, Texas, U.S.
- Title(s) on the line: WBC and The Ring heavyweight titles

Tale of the tape
Boxer	Larry Holmes	Randall Cobb
Nickname	The Easton Assassin	Tex
Hometown	Easton, Pennsylvania, U.S.	Abilene, Texas, U.S.
Purse	$1,600,000	$500,000
Pre-fight record	40–0 (30 KO)	20–2 (18 KO)
Age	33 years	32 years, 6 months
Height	6 ft 3 in (191 cm)	6 ft 3 in (191 cm)
Weight	217 1/2 lb (99 kg)	234 1/4 lb (106 kg)
Style	Orthodox	Orthodox
Recognition	WBC and The Ring; Heavyweight Champion	WBC; No. 5 Ranked Heavyweight

Result
- Holmes wins via 15th-round unanimous decision (150–135, 150–135, 149–136)

Larry Holmes vs. Randall "Tex" Cobb, billed as Duel in the Dome, was a professional boxing match contested on November 26, 1982, for the WBC and The Ring heavyweight titles.

== Background ==
WBC heavyweight champion Larry Holmes had successfully defended his title the previous June against top-ranked contender Gerry Cooney in what was a heavily anticipated contest. Holmes briefly mulled retirement stating there was "a lot of chances" that the Cooney fight could be his last. However, just two months later, Holmes signed on to face the WBC's fifth-ranked contender Randall "Tex" Cobb, with promoter Don King announcing that the fight, which was then-undated and without a venue, would happen prior to the end of the year. Cobb had previously been scheduled to challenge the WBA heavyweight champion Mike Weaver for his title, but a series of postponements due to injuries from both fighters led to the fight being cancelled. The last postponement of the Weaver–Cobb fight resulted from Cobb suffering a lip injury during a sparring session while training that required 26 stitches to close, then during another sparring session while training for Holmes, Cobb would need a further nine stiches under his chin. Not wanting to jeopardize his fight with Holmes, Cobb would first begin wearing a football helmet and then a karate helmet with a face shield during sparring sessions.

Two months after the bout's initial announcement, King announced that the date would either be on November 22 or November 26, depending on if the 1982 NFL strike was still ongoing or not, though no venue was announced. King, after months of trying to find a venue, would officially announce that the fight would take place in Houston's Astrodome, stating that he chose the venue to "to bring boxing back to the people and out of the casino atmosphere of Las Vegas."

== Fight details ==
Though Cobb became only the second fighter to last the full 15-round distance with Holmes since he became heavyweight champion, Holmes dominated the entire fight, nearly sweeping all 15 rounds on all three official scorecards with only judge Chuck Hassett giving Cobb a winning round. While Holmes scored punches nearly at will and badly battered and bloodied Cobb's face, Holmes was unable to score a knockdown over his challenger.

Despite his dominant performance, Holmes remained complementary of Cobb's performance stating afterwards "Randy Cobb has nothing to be ashamed of. Cobb can put it down that he went 15 rounds with me."

== Fight card ==
Confirmed bouts:

Weight Class	Weight		vs.		Method	Round	Notes
Heavyweight	200+ lbs.	Larry Holmes (c)	def.	Randall Cobb	UD	15	^{note 1}
Heavyweight	200+ lbs.	Greg Page (c)	def.	James Tillis	TKO	8/12	^{note 2}
Lightweight	135 lbs.	José Luis Ramírez	def.	Frankie Moultrie	KO	3/12	^{note 3}
Heavyweight	200+ lbs.	David Bey	def.	George Chaplin	TKO	4/10
Cruiserweight	190 lbs.	Carlos De León	def.	Ivy Brown	PTS	10
Bantamweight	118 lbs.	Kent Nealey	def.	Antonio Perez	TKO	2/6

^Note 1 For WBC and The Ring Heavyweight Titles
^Note 2 For USBA Heavyweight Title
^Note 3 For NABF Lightweight Title

== Broadcasting ==
Country	Broadcaster
United States	ABC

Preceded by vs. Gerry Cooney	Larry Holmes's bouts November 26, 1982	Succeeded by vs. Lucien Rodriguez
Preceded by vs. Jeff Shelburg	Trevor Berbick's bouts November 26, 1982	Succeeded by vs. Jeff Shelburg
