= Double Dynamite (boxing) =

- Date: October 3, 1981
- Venue: Rosemont Horizon, Rosemont, Illinois, U.S.

Double Dynamite was a professional boxing card contested at the Rosemont Horizon in Rosemont, Illinois on October 3, 1981.

Promoted by Bob Arum of Top Rank, the card was co-headlined by two world title fights; Marvin Hagler vs. Mustafa Hamsho for the undisputed middleweight title held by Hagler, and WBA heavyweight champion Mike Weaver making the second defense of his title against James Tillis.

== Hagler vs. Hamsho ==
Double Dynamite: Hagler vs. Hamsho
- Title(s) on the line: WBA, WBC and The Ring middleweight titles

Tale of the tape
Boxer	Marvin Hagler	Mustafa Hamsho
Nickname	Marvelous	
Hometown	Brockton, Massachusetts, U.S.	Latakia, Syria
Pre-fight record	52–2–2 (43 KO)	32–1–1 (19 KO)
Age	27 years, 4 months	27 years, 11 months
Height	5 ft 8 in (173 cm)	5 ft 8 in (173 cm)
Weight	157 lb (71 kg)	160 lb (73 kg)
Style	Southpaw	Southpaw
Recognition	WBA, WBC and The Ring; Middleweight Champion	WBC; No. 1 Ranked Middleweight

Result
- Hagler wins via 11th-round technical knockout

=== Background ===
A fight between Hagler and Hamsho had been in the making for roughly a year. Hamsho, having risen to the number-three in the WBC's middleweight rankings, publicly called for a title fight against Hagler after defeating Ruby Robles in late 1980. The following February, Hamsho, now the number-two ranked middleweight contender, defeated Curtis Parker and afterwards, his manager-trainer Paddy Flood revealed that a contract for a Hagler–Hamsho title fight later in the year had been agreed to. However, that May, promoter Don King organized an "eliminator" bout between Hamsho, now ranked as the WBC's number-one middleweight, and former undisputed middleweight champion Alan Minter, who was ranked number-two. With a shot against Hagler on the line, Hamsho and Minter would meet on June 6, 1981, with Hamsho earning a close spit-decision victory. In mid-July, Arum announced that the Hagler–Hamsho and Weaver–Tillis bouts would take place on October 3, 1981.

=== Fight details ===
Hagler would dominate the fight through 10+ rounds, brutalizing Hamsho's face throughout as he effectively counterpunched the aggressive Hamsho, who spent the fight pressing the action but struggled to penetrate Hagler's defense and land any sustained offense. The only notable damage Hamsho was able to bring upon Hagler came via an illegal headbutt in the third round which opened up a cut above Hagler's right eye, however, Hagler would open a gash under Hamsho's right eye with a left hook later in the same round. The following round, Hagler would open another cut around Hamsho's eyelid and by the end of the fight, Hamsho's face was badly bruised and bloodied and required 55 stitches to close the numerous cuts he had received.

The ending came just past the second minute of the 11th-round when Hagler stunned the Hamsho with a right that sent him into the ropes where Hagler landed several unanswered blows to the exhausted and badly injured Hamsho, causing referee Octavio Meyran to finally step in and stop the fight at 2:09 of the round, giving Hagler the technical knockout victory.

== Weaver vs. Tillis ==
Double Dynamite: Weaver vs. Tillis
- Title(s) on the line: WBA heavyweight title

Tale of the tape
Boxer	Mike Weaver	James Tillis
Nickname	Hercules	Quick
Hometown	Diamond Bar, California, U.S.	Tulsa, Oklahoma, U.S.
Purse	$750,000	$200,000
Pre-fight record	23–9 (15 KO)	20–0 (16 KO)
Age	30 years, 3 months	24 years, 2 months
Height	6 ft 1 in (185 cm)	6 ft 2 in (188 cm)
Weight	215 lb (98 kg)	209 lb (95 kg)
Style	Orthodox	Orthodox
Recognition	WBA; Heavyweight Champion	WBA; No. 2 Ranked Heavyweight; WBC; No. 8 Ranked Heavyweight

Result
- Weaver wins via 15th-round unanimous decision (147–142, 146–142, 145–143)

=== Background ===
WBA heavyweight champion Mike Weaver's last title defense had come in October 1980 against South African contender Gerrie Coetzee in Coetzee's native country. Following his defeat of Coetzee, Weaver's next opponent remained unknown until the following April when it was revealed by Ken Norton's manager Jack Cohen that he had been in talks with Weaver's representatives regarding a Weaver–Norton bout that was tentatively agreed to take place in New York City's Madison Square Garden later in the year should Norton first get past top-ranked contender Gerry Cooney in May. However, the Weaver–Norton fight went up in smoke when Cooney defeated Norton in blowout fashion, scoring a first-round knockout just 54 seconds into the fight. Almost immediately following Cooney's victory, an agreement was reached that would see Weaver instead defend his title against Cooney in either Madison Square Garden or Nassau Coliseum in Cooney's native Long Island.

The Weaver–Cooney was met with immediate backlash from promoter Bob Arum who took the matter to court, claiming Weaver owed his organization, Top Rank, one more fight, which Arum planned to be against James Tillis, the WBA's number-three ranked heavyweight contender. Though the WBA had Cooney ranked as the number-one heavyweight contender, the organization ruled in Arum and Tillis' favor, claiming that Tillis was the best available contender as their top two contenders at the time, Cooney and Leon Spinks had already signed to fight Norton and Larry Holmes respectively, and gave Weaver an ultimatum to either face Tillis or be stripped of the title. Weaver appealed the WBA's decision but the WBA upheld their decision and reiterated their plans to strip him of the title should he not face Tillis. Weaver initially refused to face Tillis and was set to give up the title in order to proceed with the more lucrative Cooney fight, but after a change of heart, in late June, Weaver ultimately agreed to face Tillis in order to keep his title. The Weaver–Tillis bout was officially announced in early July to take place in Rosemont, Illinois on October 3, 1981. As part of the agreement, the winner of the bout was contractually obligated to face Cooney within four months, however, this ultimately did not happen when Cooney opted to pursue a fight with Larry Holmes the following summer.

=== Fight details ===
From the start of the fight on, Tillis was in constant motion, often back-peddling away from Weaver, forcing Weaver to be pursuit for the duration of the bout, which went the full 15 rounds, leaving Weaver at the point of exhaustion by the end. Nevertheless, Weaver still did just enough to claim a unanimous decision victory, with all three official judges scoring in his favor with scores 147–142, 146–142 and 145–143.

== Fight card ==
Confirmed bouts:

Weight Class	Weight		vs.		Method	Round	Notes
Heavyweight	200+ lbs.	Mike Weaver (c)	def.	James Tillis	UD	15	^{note 1}
Middleweight	160 lbs.	Marvin Hagler (c)	def.	Mustafa Hamsho	TKO	11/15	^{note 2}
Middlweight	160 lbs.	Mario Maldonado	def.	Joaquin Macias	TKO	1/10
Heavyweight	200+ lbs.	John Dino Denis	def.	Henry Porter	PTS	8
Heavyweight	200+ lbs.	Alfonzo Ratliff	def.	Vernon Johnston	KO	2/8
Light Heavyweight	175 lbs.	Lee Roy Murphy	def.	Elvis Parks	PTS	6
Super Middleweight	168 lbs.	Lenny LaPaglia	def.	Steve Wetzel	KO	1/4

^Note 1 For WBA Heavyweight Title
^Note 2 For WBA, WBC and The Ring Middleweight Titles

== Broadcasting ==
Country	Broadcaster
United States	HBO

Preceded by vs. Vito Antuofermo	Marvin Hagler's bouts October 3, 1981	Succeeded by vs. William "Caveman" Lee
Preceded by vs. Alan Minter	Mustafa Hamsho's bouts October 3, 1981	Succeeded by vs. Curtis Parker
Preceded by vs. Gerrie Coetzee	Mike Weaver's bouts October 3, 1981	Succeeded by vs. Michael Dokes
Preceded by vs. Tom Fischer	James Tillis's bouts October 3, 1981	Succeeded by vs. Jerry Williams
