= Mike Tyson vs. Carl Williams =

Boxing competition

- Date: July 21, 1989
- Venue: Convention Hall, Atlantic City, New Jersey
- Title(s) on the line: WBA, WBC, IBF and The Ring undisputed heavyweight championship

Tale of the tape
Boxer	Mike Tyson	Carl Williams
Nickname	Iron	The Truth
Hometown	Catskill, New York, U.S.	Absecon, New Jersey, U.S.
Purse	$11,200,000	$1,600,000
Pre-fight record	36–0 (32 KO)	22–2 (17 KO)
Age	23 years	29 years, 8 months
Height	5 ft 10 in (178 cm)	6 ft 4 in (193 cm)
Weight	219 1/4 lb (99 kg)	218 lb (99 kg)
Style	Orthodox	Orthodox
Recognition	WBA, WBC, IBF and The Ring undisputed Heavyweight Champion; The Ring No. 1 ranked pound-for-pound fighter	IBF; No. 1 Ranked Heavyweight

Result
- Tyson wins via 1st round technical knockout

Mike Tyson vs. Carl Williams was a professional boxing match contested on July 21, 1989, for WBA, WBC, IBF, and The Ring heavyweight championships.

== Background ==
After Tyson's dominating victory over Frank Bruno five months prior, negotiations for a potential bout with Carl Williams began, and on June 15, 1989, the fight was made official. Four years earlier, Williams had challenged then-IBF Heavyweight champion Larry Holmes for the title, only to narrowly lose by unanimous decision. Prior to his fight with Tyson, Williams had won his previous five fights, including a victory over former champion Trevor Berbick which got him back into contention.

== The fight ==
The fight would only last 93 seconds, becoming Tyson's second quickest title fight after his 91-second victory over Michael Spinks the previous year. Tyson and Williams began the fight trading punches with each other, though Tyson's aggressiveness caused Williams to hold several times. About 76 seconds into the round, Williams attempted to hit Tyson with a left jab. Tyson countered and hit Williams with a left hook that sent Williams to the canvas. Though Williams was able to get back on his feet and was seemingly ready to continue the fight, referee Randy Neumann controversially stopped the fight and awarded Tyson the victory by technical knockout.

In an interview after the fight, the referee was asked why he had stopped the fight and he replied: “When he got up at eight, he [Carl Williams] was wobbly. He wasn't standing up, he was leaning against the ropes. I asked him a question, a very simple question, ‘How do you feel?’. Not for the answer, but to see how he responded. His eyes were blank, his expression was blank, he had no answer.”

== Aftermath ==
Because of the controversial nature of Tyson's victory, both Williams and his manager Ira Leibowitz urged the WBA, WBC and IBF to change the ruling Tyson victory to no-contest while also demanding a rematch between the two. However, all three boxing organizations, as well as Tyson's camp refused a Tyson–Williams rematch with Don King's spokesman stating that Williams would have to "go out and knock out a few good fighters" before a rematch with Tyson could happen.

Tyson's victory over Williams would mark the last successful defence of his Undisputed Heavyweight Championship. His next fight would be against little-known James "Buster" Douglas on February 11, 1990, in Tokyo, Japan. Despite being a 42-1 underdog, Douglas was able to knock out Tyson in the 10th round to pull off the upset and become the new Undisputed Champion.

HBO, which broadcast the fight live across the nation, did not expect the early conclusion and was hence forced to fill time with episodes of The Kids In The Hall and HBO One Night Stand (prior to the latter, they put up a card explaining the unscheduled broadcast).

== Undercard ==
Confirmed bouts:

== Broadcasting ==
Country	Broadcaster
Mexico	Imevisión
Philippines	GMA Network
United Kingdom	ITV
United States	HBO

Preceded by vs. Frank Bruno	Mike Tyson's bouts 21 July 1989	Succeeded by vs. Buster Douglas
Preceded by vs. Mike Rouse	Carl Williams's bouts 21 July 1989	Succeeded by vs. Melton Bowen
