= Larry Holmes vs. Mike Weaver =

- Date: June 22, 1979
- Venue: Madison Square Garden, New York City, New York, U.S.
- Title(s) on the line: WBC heavyweight title

Tale of the tape
Boxer	Larry Holmes	Mike Weaver
Nickname	The Easton Assassin	Hercules
Hometown	Easton, Pennsylvania, U.S.	Diamond Bar, California, U.S.
Purse	$400,000	$50,000
Pre-fight record	30–0 (21 KO)	19–8 (13 KO)
Age	29 years, 7 months	28 years
Height	6 ft 3 in (191 cm)	6 ft 1 in (185 cm)
Weight	215 lb (98 kg)	202 lb (92 kg)
Style	Orthodox	Orthodox
Recognition	WBC; Heavyweight Champion	WBC; No. 8 Ranked Heavyweight; USBA; Heavyweight Champion

Result
- Holmes wins via 12th-round technical knockout

Larry Holmes vs. Mike Weaver was a professional match contested on June 22, 1979, for the WBC heavyweight title.

== Background ==
In late March 1979, promoter Don King announced that Larry Holmes would make the third defense of his WBC heavyweight title against little-known Mike Weaver, who had become the WBC's number-eight ranked heavyweight contender in March after a five-fight winning streak, during which he had captured the USBA heavyweight title. King announced that Madison Square Garden would host the fight, but did not have a set date until nearly two months later when June 22 was officially announced as the date. Weaver, who sported an unimpressive 19–8 record, was viewed as little more than a tune-up for Holmes, who had already signed to meet the WBC's top-ranked heavyweight Earnie Shavers that September. Holmes, however, denied that he was looking past Weaver in favor of Shavers, stating "If I thought he was just a tune-up (for Shavers), I wouldn't be training for six weeks."

King hoped to sell the broadcast rights to one of the "Big Three" networks; ABC, NBC or CBS, but all three declined, feeling that Holmes' choice of the virtually unknown Weaver as an opponent was not appealing. Left with little choice, King would sell the rights to HBO for $150,000 at the behest of HBO sports executive Michael J. Fuchs. Though HBO had broadcast several boxing events before, including The Rumble in the Jungle and the Thrilla in Manila, the majority of fights largely aired on broadcast television. The Holmes–Weaver bout was largely credited with greatly expanding HBO's boxing coverage into the 1980s until its cancellation in 2018.

== Fight details ==
Though Weaver was a sizeable underdog, he gave Holmes a much tougher fight than expected. Holmes got off to a good start, taking the first three rounds behind his trademark left jab, but Weaver got back into the fight by winning rounds four and five, stunning Holmes with a right in the fourth that sent Holmes down on his knee, though referee Harold Valan incorrectly ruled it a slip rather than a knockdown. The two fighters would go back and forth in the rounds after before Holmes sent Weaver down with a right uppercut during the final seconds of the 11th round. Though clearly hurt, Weaver managed to pull himself back on his feet just as the round ended. However, Weaver had not recovered enough and was still dazed as Holmes began the 12th round on the attack, driving Weaver into the ropes and landing several big, unanswered blows to Weaver's head before Valan stopped the fight 44 seconds into the round, giving Holmes the victory via technical knockout.

== Aftermath ==
Weaver would go on to win the WBA version of the heavyweight title on March 31, 1980. Based on this and the fact that Holmes had defended his title against Weaver, The Ring decided to officially recognize Holmes as its heavyweight champion, starting March 31.

== Fight card ==
Confirmed bouts:

Weight Class	Weight		vs.		Method	Round	Notes
Heavyweight	200+ lbs.	Larry Holmes (c)	def.	Mike Weaver	TKO	12/15	^{note 1}
Welterweight	147 lbs.	Roberto Durán	def.	Carlos Palomino	UD	10
Heavyweight	200+ lbs.	Jimmy Young	def.	Wendell Bailey	TKO	3/10
Middleweight	160 lbs.	Mike Baker	def.	Clarence Gilmore	TKO	4/10
Light Welterweight	140 lbs.	Willie Rodriguez	def.	Ruby Ortiz	UD	8
Lightweight	135 lbs.	Johnny Compo	def.	Leon Williams	KO	3/4
Lightweight	135 lbs.	Raymond Roman	def.	Danny Daniels	SD	4

^Note 1 For WBC Heavyweight Title

== Broadcasting ==
Country	Broadcaster
United States	HBO

Preceded by vs. Ossie Ocasio	Larry Holmes's bouts June 22, 1979	Succeeded by vs. Earnie Shavers II
Preceded by vs. Oliver Philipps	Mike Weaver's bouts June 22, 1979	Succeeded by vs. Harry Terrell
