= Larry Holmes vs. Earnie Shavers II =

1979 boxing match

Epic Explosion
- Date: September 28, 1979
- Venue: Caesars Palace, Paradise, Nevada, U.S.
- Title(s) on the line: WBC heavyweight title

Tale of the tape
Boxer	Larry Holmes	Earnie Shavers
Nickname	The Easton Assassin	The Black Destroyer
Hometown	Easton, Pennsylvania, U.S.	Warren, Ohio, U.S.
Purse	$2,500,000	$300,000
Pre-fight record	31–0 (22 KO)	58–7–1 (56 KO)
Age	29 years, 10 months	35 years
Height	6 ft 3 in (191 cm)	6 ft 0 in (183 cm)
Weight	210 lb (95 kg)	211 lb (96 kg)
Style	Orthodox	Orthodox
Recognition	WBC; Heavyweight Champion	WBC; No. 1 Ranked Heavyweight

Result
- Holmes wins via 11th-round technical knockout

Larry Holmes vs. Earnie Shavers II, billed as Epic Explosion, was a professional match contested on September 28, 1979, for the WBC heavyweight title.

== Background ==
Over a month prior to his June fight against the then-little known Mike Weaver, WBC heavyweight champion Larry Holmes' planned next title defense was announced in mid-May to take place against the WBC's number-one ranked contender Earnie Shavers. In order to preserve his lucrative fight with Shavers, Holmes would still need to defeat Weaver, who sported a dismal 19–8 record and was not expected to be much of a challenge to the undefeated Holmes. Nevertheless, Holmes denied reports that he was wasn't taking Weaver seriously, stating "If I thought he was just a tune-up (for Shavers), I wouldn't be training for six weeks." On June 22, 1979, Holmes survived a game Weaver, who put up a much better fight than expected, winning by 12th-round technical knockout, officially putting the gears in motion for the Holmes–Shavers title fight.

Originally, promoter Don King planned to stage the bout in the 76,000-seat Giants Stadium in East Rutherford, New Jersey on September 19. However, a left eye injury Holmes claimed he had suffered in the Weaver bout as result of an errant thumb, resulted in the postponement of the bout that also necessitated a change of venue. In mid-July, King revealed that the fight would officially take place on September 28, though a new venue was still not named. Though venues in Hawaii and Seattle were in the running, King ultimately announced in August that Nevada's Caesars Palace would host the fight.

To supplement the Holmes–Shavers main event, King organized an extravagant undercard. Featured on the televised portion of the card were; Roberto Durán vs. Zeferino Gonzalez, Jimmy Young vs. Michael Dokes, recently crowned NABF welterweight champion Sugar Ray Leonard making the first and only defense of that title against Andy Price, and WBC super bantamweight champion Wilfredo Gómez defending his crown against Carlos Mendoza.

== Fight details ==
Holmes dominated the first six rounds, using constant movement and his powerful left jab to keep Shavers at bay. However, late in the seventh round, Shavers connected flush with a big overhand right that sent Holmes crashing down on his back. Acting on pure instinct, Holmes rose quickly to his feet and was allowed to continue, but was clearly dazed and on wobbly legs as Shavers went on the attack swinging wildly in hopes of scoring a knockout victory, though Holmes was able to survive the 30 remaining seconds of the round. Holmes would recover from the knockdown and resumed his dominant performance from the eighth round onwards. In the eleventh round, Holmes continued to batter a tiring and almost defenseless Shavers. Referee Davey Pearl would briefly pause the fight, examining the bruised face of Shavers and asking if he wanted to continue. After Shavers indicated that he did want to continue, the fight was resumed, but after Shavers was hit by three-punch combination from Holmes, Pearl stopped the fight. Holmes was named the winner by technical knockout at 2:00 of the round.

== Fight card ==
Confirmed bouts:

Weight Class	Weight		vs.		Method	Round	Notes
Heavyweight	200+ lbs.	Larry Holmes (c)	def.	Earnie Shavers	TKO	11/15	^{note 1}
Super Bantamweight	122 lbs.	Wilfredo Gómez (c)	def.	Carlos Mendoza	TKO	10/15	^{note 2}
Welterweight	147 lbs.	Ray Leonard (c)	def.	Andy Price	KO	1/12	^{note 3}
Heavyweight	200+ lbs.	Michael Dokes	def.	Jimmy Young	UD	10
Light Middleweight	154 lbs.	Roberto Durán	def.	Zeferino Gonzalez	UD	10
Light Heavyweight	175 lbs.	Jim Ingram	def.	Clarence Geigger	PTS	6
Welterweight	147 lbs.	Idika Nsofor	def.	Junior Foster	KO	4/6

^Note 1 For WBC Heavyweight Title
^Note 2 For WBC and The Ring Super Bantamweight Titles
^Note 3 For NABF Welterweight Title

== Broadcasting ==
Country	Broadcaster
United States	ABC

Preceded by vs. Mike Weaver	Larry Holmes's bouts September 28, 1979	Succeeded by vs. Lorenzo Zanon
Preceded by vs. Eddie Parotte	Earnie Shavers's bouts September 28, 1979	Succeeded by vs. Bernardo Mercado
