= Randall "Tex" Cobb =

American boxer and actor (born 1950)

- Born: Randall Craig Cobb; May 7, 1950 (age 76); Bridge City, Texas, U.S.
- Other names: Tex
- Nationality: American
- Height: 6 ft 3 in (191 cm)
- Division: Heavyweight
- Rank: Black belt in Karate
- Years active: 1975–2001

Professional boxing record
- Total: 51
- Wins: 42
- By knockout: 35
- Losses: 7
- By knockout: 1
- Draws: 1
- No contests: 1

Kickboxing record
- Total: 11
- Wins: 9
- By knockout: 9
- Losses: 2
- Draws: 0

Other information
- University: Temple University

Randall Craig "Tex" Cobb (born May 7, 1950) is an American actor, martial artist, and former professional boxer who competed in the heavyweight division. Considered to possess one of the greatest boxing chins of all time, Cobb was a brawler who also packed considerable punching power. He began his fighting career in full contact kickboxing in 1975 before making the jump to professional boxing two years later. He unsuccessfully challenged Larry Holmes for the WBC and lineal world heavyweight title in November 1982, losing by a one-sided unanimous decision. Cobb took wins over notable heavyweights of his era such as Bernardo Mercado, Earnie Shavers, and Leon Spinks. He was ranked in the global top 10 heavyweight boxers by The Ring, in 1981 and 1982, and BoxRec in 1982.

In addition to his fighting career, he has acted in numerous films and television series, usually appearing as a villain or henchman. Examples include roles in the Coen brothers film Raising Arizona and the popular TV programs Miami Vice, The X-Files and Walker, Texas Ranger.

== Early life ==
Cobb was born on May 7, 1950, in Bridge City, Texas, the son of Norma Grace (née Alexander) and Williard Glynn Cobb, a factory foreman. His mother was of Scottish ancestry. He was raised in Abilene, Texas, and attended Abilene High School, where he played on the football team. Cobb later studied at Abilene Christian University, but dropped out at the age of 19, and began karate training. He lived in the dojo, cleaning the mats to earn his keep. After earning his black belt, he craved full-contact competition, thus took up kickboxing, fighting in an era when only full contact rules were used in the United States. He won his first five kickboxing matches, going 5–0 with all knockouts before losing to John Jackson by decision.

He TKO'd El Paso Golden Gloves Heavyweight Champion and karate black belt, David Ochoa, in the first-ever full contact martial arts event in El Paso, Texas, in 1975. The promoters were Robert Nava and boxing trainer Tom McKay under the guidance of boxing guru and matchmaker, Paul Clinite. Clinite signed Randall to a professional-boxing contract a few weeks later. He also signed Ochoa, who had fought amateur under the guidance of McKay as his trainer.

Clinite provided films of heavyweight boxers to study, to get the huge Cobb a good style. After a few days, it was decided that Randall should work at learning the "Joe Louis shuffle". Randall, Paul, and Tom spent a few months at El Paso's San Juan Boxing Gym just doing the simple basics. A few months later, Clinite made arrangements for Randall to be sent to Joe Frazier's gym in Philadelphia.

== Boxing career ==
After five straight wins as a professional kickboxer, Cobb lost his first two amateur bouts. In his professional-boxing debut on January 19, 1977, in El Paso, he knocked out Pedro Vega. He went on to win 13 straight fights by 1979, all by knockout. Cobb was a fighter who had hitting power, as shown by his eighth-round knockout victory over Earnie Shavers in 1980. He lost his two following bouts to Ken Norton and Michael Dokes, respectively, but soon bounced back to earn a shot at Larry Holmes' WBC World Heavyweight Championship.

On November 26, 1982, at Houston's Astrodome, Cobb was defeated in a unanimous decision by Holmes, who won all 15 rounds on two of three scorecards. The bloody one-sidedness of the fight, which came 13 days after the bout between Ray Mancini and Duk Koo Kim, that led to Kim's death four days later due to brain trauma, horrified sportscaster Howard Cosell so much that he vowed never to cover another professional match, which Cobb jokingly referred to as his "gift to the sport of boxing."

When prodded further regarding Cosell's remarks, Cobb observed, "Hey, if it gets him to stop broadcasting NFL games, I'll go play football for a week, too!" When asked if he would consider a rematch, Cobb replied that he did not think that Holmes would agree, as "the champion's fists couldn't handle a rematch." In an interview with Johnny Carson after the Holmes fight, Carson said "He seems to have a much longer reach than you do", to which Cobb replied, "Looked like that to you too?"

He made a brief return to kickboxing on May 5, 1984, to challenge John Jackson for the Professional Karate Association United States Heavyweight title in Birmingham, Alabama, losing on points. Returning to boxing, between late 1984 and 1985, he lost four straight fights, the last of which was a knockout at the hands of Dee Collier, the only time he was ever KO'd. After a two-year hiatus, he made a return to the ring and went on a 20-fight undefeated streak against lightly regarded opponents, including a win over past-his-prime former champ Leon Spinks in 1988, before retiring again rather suddenly in 1993.

A 1993 Sports Illustrated article alleged that Cobb had participated in a fixed fight with Sonny Barch and had used cocaine with Barch and promoter Rick "Elvis" Parker before and after the fight. Cobb said the magazine libeled him, and he sued for US$150 million. In 1999, a jury awarded Cobb $8.5 million in compensatory damages and $2.2 million in punitive damages. The verdict was overturned in 2002 by a federal appeals court, which said that the article was not published with "actual malice". The magazine did not interview the referee and other ringside officials who were at the match, which tends to show that the magazine "might not have acted as a prudent reporter would have acted", the ruling stated. "But the actual malice standard requires more than just proof of negligence".

== Acting career ==
As a Hollywood actor, Cobb has played a series of villainous roles in films such as Police Academy 4: Citizens on Patrol, Blind Fury, Ace Ventura: Pet Detective, Liar Liar, The Golden Child, Naked Gun 33 1/3: The Final Insult, Fletch Lives, and Ernest Goes to Jail. He has made guest appearances on several television shows, including Miami Vice; Highlander: The Series; Married... with Children; Moonlighting; Walker, Texas Ranger; MacGyver (as the character Earthquake); and The X-Files.

Cobb's other appearances include the 1983 film Uncommon Valor, in which he played a rare heroic role; the 1987 movie Critical Condition, in which he plays a character in the psych ward who thinks he is a "brother" (an African American); The Champ, which referred to his boxing career by casting Cobb as a boxer who fights the title character, Billy Flynn; and Diggstown, in which he plays a prison inmate who fights at the behest of a con man.

One of his more memorable roles is the menacing outlaw biker/bounty hunter Leonard Smalls in the 1987 Coen Brothers film Raising Arizona. Joel Coen later described Cobb as difficult to work with: "he's less an actor than a force of nature".

On Late Night with David Letterman on January 7, 1987, he was asked how boxing compared to acting and said "In the last job I had, if you didn't do it just exactly right you got hit in the mouth. In this kind of job, the worst thing that can happen, I mean if everything in the whole world goes wrong, take two."

In 1992, he appeared in Vince Gill's music video for his song "Don't Let Our Love Start Slippin' Away". In 1993, he spoofed himself by appearing in a commercial for Old El Paso salsa.

== Personal life ==
Cobb lives in Philadelphia, and maintained a friendship with Philadelphia Daily News columnist Pete Dexter, who frequently commented on boxing. In a notorious 1981 Grays Ferry incident, Cobb came to the defense of Dexter, who during the course of a bar brawl, was severely beaten. Cobb rescued him and endured a broken arm, costing him a scheduled fight with Mike Weaver.

Cobb's eldest son Bo was killed in an accident in early 2001. His younger son Joshua pursued a short career as a boxer. Cobb was married to his sons' mother, Kathy Krakauskas Morin, from 1982 to 1986.

In January 2008, at age 57, Cobb graduated magna cum laude from Temple University with a bachelor's degree in sport and recreation management. He remarked that it was odd to hear the cheers of a packed arena without being in a boxing ring. "It was nice to have that opportunity to wear a robe, to step up there and not have to worry about bleeding", Cobb said.

== Boxing record ==
42 Wins (35 knockouts, 7 decisions), 7 Losses (1 knockout, 6 decisions), 1 Draw, 1 No Contest
Result	Record	Opponent	Type	Round, time	Date	Location	Notes
Win	42–7–1 (1)	(United States) Andre Smiley	TKO	2 (8)	1993-06-07	(United States) Joel Coliseum, Winston-Salem, North Carolina	
Win	41–7–1 (1)	(United States) Mike Acklie	TKO	6 (8)	1993-05-01	(United States) Lincoln, Nebraska	
Win	40–7–1 (1)	(United States) Guile Wilkinson	PTS	6 (6), 3:00	1993-04-19	(United States) Saint Louis, Missouri	
Win	39–7–1 (1)	(United States) John Warrior	KO	1 (?)	1993-03-30	(United States) Kemper Arena, Kansas City, Missouri	
Win	38–7–1 (1)	(United States) Mike Smith	KO	1 (?)	1993-03-01	(United States) Allis Plaza Hotel, Kansas City, Missouri	
Win	37–7–1 (1)	(United States) Paul Lewis	KO	3 (?)	1993-01-19	(United States) Boise Centre, Boise, Idaho	
Win	36–7–1 (1)	(United States) Jim Taylor	KO	1 (?)	1992-12-03	(United States) Myriad Convention Center, Oklahoma City, Oklahoma	
Win	35–7–1 (1)	(United States) Rick Kellar	TKO	4 (?)	1992-11-28	(United States) North Platte, Nebraska	
Win	34–7–1 (1)	(United States) Jeff May	TKO	1 (10)	1992-10-27	(United States) The Palace, Auburn Hills, Michigan	
NC	33–7–1 (1)	(United States) Sonny Barch	NC	1 (10), 1:10	1992-09-15	(United States) War Memorial Auditorium, Fort Lauderdale, Florida	Originally a TKO win for Cobb, overturned to a no contest after both fighters tested positive for cocaine
Win	33–7–1	(United States) Leon Spinks	MD	10 (10), 3:00	1988-03-18	(United States) Nashville Municipal Auditorium, Nashville, Tennessee	
Win	32–7–1	(United States) Michael Johnson	KO	6 (?)	1987-05-29	(United States) Birmingham, Alabama	
Win	31–7–1	(United States) Aaron Brown	KO	5 (?)	1987-05-11	(United States) Finkey's Bar, Daytona Beach, Florida	
Draw	30–7–1	(United States) Bill Duncan	TD	1 (?)	1987-04-17	(United States) Springfield, Missouri	
Win	30–7	(United States) Rick Kellar	TKO	2 (10), 2:26	1987-04-07	(United States) Lincoln, Nebraska	
Win	29–7	(United States) Louis Pappin	TKO	1 (10)	1987-04-06	(United States) Terre Haute, Indiana	
Win	28–7	(United States) Frank Lux	TKO	2 (10), 0:55	1987-03-31	(United States) Madison Central High School, Richmond, Kentucky	
Win	27–7	(United States) Stan Johnson	KO	1 (10)	1987-03-26	(United States) Fayetteville, Arkansas	
Win	26–7	(United States) Frank Lux	KO	2 (?)	1987-03-21	(United States) Springfield, Missouri	
Win	25–7	(United States) Phil Rendine	KO	2 (?)	1987-03-12	(United States) Hot Springs, Arkansas	
Loss	24–7	(United States) Dee Collier	KO	1 (10), 2:33	1985-10-29	(United States) Reseda Country Club, Reseda, California	
Loss	24–6	(United States) Eddie Gregg	UD	10 (10), 3:00	1985-05-20	(United States) Lawlor Events Center, Reno, Nevada	
Loss	24–5	(United States) Michael Dokes	TD	4 (12), 1:03	1985-03-15	(United States) Riviera, Las Vegas	For the WBC Continental Americas Heavyweight Championship, the bout was stopped due to an accidental foul.
Loss	24–4	(United States) James Douglas	MD	10 (10), 3:00	1984-11-09	(United States) Riviera, Las Vegas	
Win	24–3	(United States) Mark Lee	MD	10 (10), 3:00	1984-09-13	(United States) Houston	
Win	23–3	(United States) Ernie Smith	KO	1 (?)	1984-08-17	(United States) Houston	
Win	22–3	(United States) Ruben Williams	UD	10 (10), 3:00	1984-02-22	(United States) Civic Auditorium, Bakersfield, California	
Win	21–3	(United States) Mike Jameson	UD	10 (10), 3:00	1983-09-29	(United States) Circle Star Theater, San Carlos, California	
Loss	20–3	(United States) Larry Holmes	UD	15 (15), 3:00	1982-11-26	(United States) Astrodome, Houston	For the WBC World Heavyweight Championship
Win	20–2	(United States) Jeff Shelburg	TKO	7 (10)	1982-04-19	(United States) Resorts Casino Hotel, Atlantic City, New Jersey	
Win	19–2	(Colombia) Bernardo Mercado	PTS	10 (10), 3:00	1981-11-06	(United States) Civic Arena, Atlantic City	
Win	18–2	(United States) Harry Terrell	KO	5 (10)	1981-05-21	(United States) HemisFair Arena, San Antonio	
Loss	17–2	(United States) Michael Dokes	MD	10 (10), 3:00	1981-03-22	(United States) Caesars Palace, Las Vegas	
Loss	17–1	(United States) Ken Norton	SD	10 (10), 3:00	1980-11-07	(United States) HemisFair Arena, San Antonio	
Win	17–0	(United States) Earnie Shavers	TKO	8 (10), 2:19	1980-08-02	(United States) Joe Louis Arena, Detroit	
Win	16–0	(United States) Robert Echols	KO	1 (?)	1980-05-31	(United States) El Paso County Coliseum, El Paso, Texas	
Win	15–0	(United States) Roy Wallace	UD	10 (10), 3:00	1980-05-09	(United States) El Paso, Texas	
Win	14–0	(Mexico) Eusebio Hernandez Jr.	KO	1 (?)	1980-03-21	(United States) El Paso County Coliseum, El Paso, Texas	
Win	13–0	(United States) Terry Mims	KO	5 (?)	1979-10-24	(United States) Scranton, Pennsylvania	
Win	12–0	(United States) Don Halpin	KO	3 (?)	1979-08-28	(United States) Atlantic City	
Win	11–0	(United States) Jesse Crown	KO	2 (?)	1979-04-27	(United States) Robert Treat Hotel, Newark, New Jersey	
Win	10–0	(United States) Zack Ferguson	TKO	1 (?), 2:54	1979-04-03	(United States) Spectrum, Philadelphia	
Win	9–0	(United States) Rodell Dupree	TKO	6 (10)	1978-11-11	(United States) Boston Garden, Boston	
Win	8–0	(United States) Paul Solomon	KO	2 (?)	1978-04-07	(United States) Grand Olympic Auditorium, Los Angeles	
Win	7–0	(United States) Don Hinton	KO	1 (?)	1978-03-29	(United States) Silver Slipper, Las Vegas	
Win	6–0	(United States) Dave Martinez	KO	1 (10)	1978-03-17	(United States) The Aladdin, Las Vegas	
Win	5–0	(United States) David Wynne	KO	2 (?)	1977-07-08	(United States) San Diego Coliseum, San Diego	
Win	4–0	(United States) Ernie Smith	TKO	3 (?)	1977-05-10	(United States) El Paso County Coliseum, El Paso, Texas	
Win	3–0	(United States) Trinidad Escamilla	KO	1 (?), 1:56	1977-04-02	(United States) San Antonio Convention Center, San Antonio	
Win	2–0	(United States) Tyrone Harlee	KO	2 (?)	1977-03-11	(United States) Philadelphia Arena, Philadelphia	
Win	1–0	(United States) Pedro Vega	TKO	1 (4)	1977-01-21	(United States) El Paso County Coliseum, El Paso, Texas	

== Kickboxing record ==
Kickboxing record (incomplete)
9 wins (9 KOs), 2 losses, 0 draws
Date	Result	Opponent	Event	Location	Method	Round	Time
1984-05-05	Loss	(United States) John Jackson		(United States) Birmingham, Alabama	Decision	9	2:00
For the PKA United States Heavyweight Championship.
1983-00-00	Win	(United States) Anthony Elmore			Decision		
1975-04-18	Win	(United States) David Ochoa		(United States) El Paso, Texas	TKO	2	
Legend: Win Loss Draw/No contest Notes

== Filmography ==
Film
Year	Title	Role	Notes
1979	The Champ	Bowers	
1983	Uncommon Valor	"Sailor"	
1983	Braker	R.E. Packard	Television film
1986	The Golden Child	Til	
1987	Critical Condition	Box	
1987	The Dirty Dozen: The Deadly Mission	Eric "Swede" Wallan	Television film
1987	Raising Arizona	Leonard Smalls	
1987	Police Academy 4: Citizens on Patrol	Zack	
1987	Buy & Cell	Wolf	
1989	Fletch Lives	Ben Dover	
1989	Collision Course	Kosnic	
1989	Blind Fury	Slag	
1990	Ernest Goes to Jail	Lyle	
1991	Raw Nerve	Blake Garrett	
1992	Diggstown	Edward "Wolf" Forrester	
1994	Ace Ventura: Pet Detective	Gruff Man	
1994	Naked Gun 33 1/3: The Final Insult	Big Hairy Con	
1996	The Mouse	Himself	
1997	Liar Liar	Skull	
1998	The Next Tenant	Unknown	
2000	Vice	Lieutenant Munson	

Television
Year	Title	Role	Notes
1985	Code of Vengeance	Willard Singleton	
1985	Hardcastle and McCormick	Dennis "Corky" Conklyn	Episode: "The Career Breaker"
1987	Miami Vice	Moon	Episode: "Down for the Count (Part 1)"
1987	Moonlighting	Big Guy In Gas Station	Episode: "Sam & Dave"
1987	Frank's Place	Cyrus Litt	Episode: "Food Fight"
1988	MacGyver	Daniel Royce "Earthquake" Toberman	Episode: "The Spoilers"
1990–1991	In the Heat of the Night	Frank Kloot	Episodes: "A Problem Too Personal" and "No Other Road"
1993	Married... with Children	The Burglar	Episode: "Un-Alful Entry"
1993	Shaky Ground	Ned	Episode: "Stayin' Alive"
1994	Highlander: The Series	Kern	Episode: "Line of Fire"
1998	Walker, Texas Ranger	Dwight Trammel	Episode: "Survival"
2000	The X-Files	Bert Zupanic	Episode: "Fight Club"
2001	Walker, Texas Ranger	Dwight Trammel / Ross Dollarhide / 'flashbacks', Desperado	Episode: "The Final Showdown"
