= Larry Holmes vs. Lorenzo Zanon =

Battlestars!: Warlords of Caesars
- Date: February 3, 1980
- Venue: Caesars Palace, Paradise, Nevada, U.S.
- Title(s) on the line: WBC heavyweight title

Tale of the tape
Boxer	Larry Holmes	Lorenzo Zanon
Nickname	The Easton Assassin	
Hometown	Easton, Pennsylvania, U.S.	Novedrate, Lombardy, Italy
Purse	$600,000	$125,000
Pre-fight record	32–0 (23 KO)	25–4–2 (8 KO)
Age	30 years, 3 months	28 years, 4 months
Height	6 ft 3 in (191 cm)	6 ft 2 in (188 cm)
Weight	213 lb (97 kg)	215 lb (98 kg)
Style	Orthodox	Orthodox
Recognition	WBC; Heavyweight Champion	WBC; No. 5 Ranked Heavyweight; EBU; Heavyweight Champion

Result
- Holmes wins via 6th-round knockout

Larry Holmes vs. Lorenzo Zanon, billed as Battlestars!: Warlords of Caesars, was a professional match contested on February 3, 1980, for the WBC heavyweight title.

== Background ==
In mid-December 1979, promoter Don King announced that WBC heavyweight champion Larry Holmes would next defend his title against Lorenzo Zanon, the European heavyweight champion and the WBC's number-five ranked heavyweight. Zanon, the WBC's number-five ranked heavyweight, was not considered a substantial threat to Holmes, who already had his next two planned opponents, Leroy Jones and John Tate, lined up.

Zanon was given almost no chance of defeating Holmes and was widely mocked in the media. Among other insults, Zanon was lampooned as an "inept garbanzo" by Steve Farhood of World Boxing, both a "pushover" and an "Italian sausage" by Dick Young of the New York Daily News, and, more courteously, an "opponent" by Michael Katz of the New York Times.

In order to draw viewers to the telecast broadcast by ABC, King produced an undercar which featured a WBC super bantamweight title fight between Wilfredo Gómez and Rubén Valdéz, and undefeated up-and-coming welterweight prospect Thomas Hearns against "Fighting" Jim Richards. Gómez was attempting to break the record of 10 consecutive knockouts in title defenses, which he shared with Roberto Durán. Gómez would succeed in breaking the record, defeating Valdéz by corner retirement in the sixth round. Adding a further six knockouts to his record before vacating his title, Gómez's record of 17 consecutive knockouts in title defenses still stands to this date.

== Fight details ==
After three relatively close and uneventful rounds to start the fight, Holmes dominated and nearly ended the fight in the fourth. Putting the pressure on Zanon early in the round, Holmes landed a left-right combination flush to Zanon's face that sent him down on his back. Zanon struggled back to his feet, but was allowed to continue. Holmes continued to pressure Zanon, who back-peddled away and threw a left jab in desperation that Holmes countered with a big right hand that caught Zanon flush and sent him slumping into the ropes and then face first on the canvas. Again, Zanon struggled to his feet, beating referee Ray Solis' 10-count and was allowed to continue, however, after Holmes continued to land power punches to the struggling Zanon's head, Solis erroneously gave Zanon a standing eight count, which was not allowed by Nevada State Athletic Commission at the time, giving a dazed Zanon an opportunity to recover and survive the round. After an uneventful fifth round, Holmes dominated Zanon in the sixth before sending him down with a right cross late in the round. Zanon would rise to his feet but this time was unable to beat Solis' 10-count, giving Holmes the knockout victory at 2:39.

== Fight card ==
Confirmed bouts:

Weight Class	Weight		vs.		Method	Round	Notes
Heavyweight	200+ lbs.	Larry Holmes (c)	def.	Lorenzo Zanon	KO	6/15	^{note 1}
Super Bantamweight	122 lbs.	Wilfredo Gómez (c)	def.	Ruben Valdes	RTD	6/15	^{note 2}
Light Middleweight	154 lbs.	Thomas Hearns	def.	Jim Richards	KO	3/10
Super Flyweight	115 lbs.	Orlando Maldonado	def.	Arturo Tebaqui	KO	10/10
Light Welterweight	140 lbs.	Sterling McPhearson	def.	Jaime Nava	UD	6

^Note 1 For WBC Heavyweight Title
^Note 2 For WBC and The Ring Super Bantamweight Titles

== Broadcasting ==
Country	Broadcaster
United States	ABC

Preceded by vs. Earnie Shavers II	Larry Holmes's bouts February 3, 1980	Succeeded by vs. Leroy Jones
Preceded by vs. Claman Parker	Lorenzo Zanon's bouts February 3, 1980	Succeeded by vs. Rinaldo Pelizzari
