= Larry Holmes vs. Leroy Jones =

The Unconquered
- Date: March 31, 1980
- Venue: Caesars Palace, Paradise, Nevada, U.S.
- Title(s) on the line: WBC heavyweight title

Tale of the tape
Boxer	Larry Holmes	Leroy Jones
Nickname	The Easton Assassin	Big, Bad
Hometown	Easton, Pennsylvania, U.S.	Denver, Colorado, U.S.
Purse	$1,300,000	$150,000
Pre-fight record	33–0 (24 KO)	24–0–1 (12 KO)
Age	30 years, 4 months	30 years, 1 month
Height	6 ft 3 in (191 cm)	6 ft 5 in (196 cm)
Weight	211 lb (96 kg)	254 1/2 lb (115 kg)
Style	Orthodox	Orthodox
Recognition	WBC; Heavyweight Champion	WBC; No. 2 Ranked Heavyweight

Result
- Holmes wins via 8th-round technical knockout

Larry Holmes vs. Leroy Jones, billed as The Unconquered, was a professional match contested on March 31, 1980, for the WBC heavyweight title.

== Background ==
In December 1979, Holmes signed to face undefeated contender Leroy Jones, with the deal contingent on Holmes first defeating fringe contender Lorenzo Zanon on February 3, 1980, which Holmes accomplished via sixth-round knockout. The Holmes–Jones fight was broadcast by ABC as part of a four-fight, three-site telecast that also featured John Tate vs. Mike Weaver for the WBA heavyweight title and Marvin Johnson vs. Eddie Gregory, both at the Stokely Athletic Center in Knoxville, Tennessee, and Sugar Ray Leonard vs. Dave Boy Green for the WBC welterweight title at the Capital Centre in Landover, Maryland.

The Holmes–Jones and Tate–Weaver fights were originally supposed to lead to a unification bout between Holmes and Tate, who had already agreed to face one another after their planned victories over their underdog opponents. However, Tate reneged on his agreement with Holmes and instead planned to defend his title against the returning Muhammad Ali in a lucrative fight worth a reported $14 million. Tate's plans were derailed when Weaver scored a last-round knockout to capture the WBA heavyweight title.

== Fight details ==
Holmes dominated Jones though eight rounds, constantly landing his powerful left jab while also mixing in straight right hands and right hooks. By the end of the fight, Jones had taken so much punishment to both eyes, that both were nearly swollen shut. The end came with just seconds left in the eighth round after Holmes landed a barrage of punches totaling over a dozen on a near-defenseless Jones. Though Jones was able to remain on his feet, he was badly dazed and on wobbly legs as referee Richard Green stepped in and stopped the fight at 2:56 of the round.

Jones claimed that Holmes had illegally thumbed him the eye and utilized the laces of his boxing gloves during the fight but blamed his loss on not being in the best of shape, stating after the fight "He thumbed me, he laced me. But that's not why I lost. I lost because I wasn't in the best condition."

== Fight card ==
Confirmed bouts:

Weight Class	Weight		vs.		Method	Round	Notes
Heavyweight	200+ lbs.	Larry Holmes (c)	def.	Leroy Jones	TKO	8/15	^{note 1}
Cruiserweight	190 lbs.	Marvin Camel	def.	Mate Parlov	UD	15	^{note 2}
Welterweight	147 lbs.	Thomas Hearns	def.	Santiago Valdez	TKO	1/10
Lightweight	135 lbs.	Alexis Argüello	def.	Gerald Hayes	UD	10
Heavyweight	200+ lbs.	Eddie Wilson	def.	Marvin Stinson	DQ	1/8

^Note 1 For WBC Heavyweight Title
^Note 2 For Inaugural WBC Cruiserweight Title

== Broadcasting ==
Country	Broadcaster
United States	ABC

Preceded by vs. Lorenzo Zanon	Larry Holmes's bouts March 31, 1980	Succeeded by vs. Scott LeDoux
Preceded by vs. James J Beattie	Leroy Jones' bouts March 31, 1980	Succeeded by vs. Jeff Shelburg
