= Pedro Lovell =

Argentine boxer (1945-2020)

Personal information
- Nicknames: KO King; The LA Bomber; One Punch; Spider Rico
- Born: 9 June 1945 Quilmes, Buenos Aires, Argentina
- Died: 2020 (aged 75) United States
- Height: 6 ft 3 in (1.91 m)

Boxing career
- Stance: Orthodox

Boxing record
- Total fights: 23
- Wins: 18
- Win by KO: 14
- Losses: 3
- Draws: 2
- No contests: 0

Pedro Osvaldo Lovell (born 8 June 1945 - 2020) was an Argentine heavyweight boxer. A knockout artist with a promising career in the 1970s, he was also known for his role as Spider Rico in the films Rocky (1976) and Rocky Balboa (2006).

== Biography ==
Lovell was born in Quilmes, Buenos Aires, Argentina on 8 June 1945. His father, Santiago Alberto Lovell, who was the brother of former boxer Guillermo Lovell, came from an Afro-Argentine family of Barbadian and English descent, and his mother came from an Italian-Argentine family.

He was a citizen of Argentina who decided to make his professional career in the United States. Lovell traveled to California, where, after only a few fights, he became a big drawing card.

While his brother, Alberto, Jr., was fighting in Argentina and knocking out the likes of Jose Manuel Ibar Urtain, Pedro racked up a string of nine straight knockouts. However, Pedro's career was hampered by physical injuries and prostate problems.

In 1973, Lovell was stunningly upset by Texan knockout king Terry Krueger. Lovell had been winning the fight. He bloodied Krueger's nose and seemed headed for an easy stoppage. However, Krueger let go with a wild left hook, and Pedro Lovell's undefeated streak ended. He was unconscious for more than three minutes.

A few months later the pair were rematched, and Lovell broke Krueger's jaw on the way to scoring three knockdowns and a first round victory. Lovell went on to defeat former heavyweight contender Billy Daniels in one round.

Lovell was on the road to a title fight. He played the part of Spider Rico in the 1976 movie Rocky. He appeared in The Ring magazine and on television. He took his impressive record of knockouts into a nationally televised fight with Ken Norton. After a competitive first three rounds, Norton took control of the fight in the fourth, and knocked out Lovell in fifth round. A short time later, Lovell drew a fight against unbeaten Leroy Jones and two fights later lost a unanimous decision to future world champion Mike Weaver and announced his retirement.

Lovell was at times referred to as "KO King", "The LA Bomber", "The Jawbreaker", and "One Punch".

Some 30 years after the first Rocky film, Lovell reprised his role as Spider Rico for the film Rocky Balboa in 2006.

In October 2024, it was noted that Lovell was deceased. Lovell died in 2020 aged 75.

== Filmography ==
=== Film ===
| Year | Title | Role | Notes |
|---|---|---|---|
| 1976 | Rocky | Spider Rico | |
| 1979 | Rocky II | Spider Rico | Flashback |
| 2006 | Rocky Balboa | Spider Rico | |
