= John Tate vs. Mike Weaver =

Battle of Ole Smokey
- Date: March 31, 1980
- Venue: Stokely Athletic Center, Knoxville, Tennessee, U.S.
- Title(s) on the line: WBA heavyweight title

Tale of the tape
Boxer	John Tate	Mike Weaver
Nickname	Big	Hercules
Hometown	Knoxville, Tennessee, U.S.	Diamond Bar, California, U.S.
Purse	$600,000	$200,000
Pre-fight record	20–0 (16 KO)	21–9 (13 KO)
Age	25 years, 2 months	28 years, 9 months
Height	6 ft 4 in (193 cm)	6 ft 1 in (185 cm)
Weight	232 lb (105 kg)	207 1/2 lb (94 kg)
Style	Orthodox	Orthodox
Recognition	WBA; Heavyweight Champion	WBA; No. 1 Ranked Heavyweight

Result
- Weaver wins via 15th-round knockout

John Tate vs. Mike Weaver, billed as the Battle of Ole Smokey, was a professional match contested on March 31, 1980, for the WBA heavyweight title.

== Background ==
Promoter Bob Arum announced in late January 1980, that newly crowned WBA heavyweight champion John Tate would make his first title defense against Mike Weaver later in the year on March 31. Originally set to take place in the Las Vegas Valley, Arum changed the venue, at Tate's request, to the Stokely Athletic Center in Tate's hometown of Knoxville, Tennessee in what would be Tennessee's first ever heavyweight title fight. The Tate–Weaver fight was part of a four-fight, three-venue telecast aired by NBC that also featured WBA light heavyweight champion Marvin Johnson defending his title against Eddie Gregory, also from Knoxville, recently crowned WBC welterweight champion Sugar Ray Leonard making his first title defense against Dave Boy Green in his native Maryland, and a WBC heavyweight title match between champion Larry Holmes and challenger Leroy Jones in Nevada.

Weaver, a 2–1 underdog, was looked upon as a steppingstone for Tate, who was expected to face the returning former three-time heavyweight champion Muhammad Ali after his expected win over Weaver. Tentatively scheduled for June 27, 1980, Tate and Ali had agreed to face each other in Taiwan, with the two fighters splitting a then-unheard of purse of $14 million. Tate, however, when asked about his potential fight with Ali, refused to look past Weaver, stating "Until I can defeat Mike Weaver, I ain’t gonna think about no Ali. If I don’t beat him, it’ll be Mike Weaver fighting him. So, until I can beat Mike Weaver, I won’t even attempt to think about fighting Ali or anyone else as far as that goes."

== Fight details ==
Tate controlled the majority of the fight and built up a sizeable lead going into the later rounds. However, with Tate tiring by the 12th-round, Weaver caught Tate with a massive left hook just past the one-minute mark that staggered the champion, who in turn frequently clinched and back peddled away from Weaver in order to survive the round. From then on, Weaver was aggressor of the fight as Tate, having built up a big enough lead on the scorecards, tried to avoid getting in exchanges with his powerful challenger, though Weaver still was able to connect with power punches to Tate's head and body. Finally, in the 15th-round, with Tate needing only to survive another 45 seconds to earn a unanimous decision victory, Weaver, having backed Tate into a corner, connected flush with a left hook to Tate's head. The blow knocked Tate unconscious, who fell face first to the canvas and was counted out by referee Ernesto Magana. Weaver had scored a last minute knockout victory at 2:15 of the 15th round.

== Aftermath ==
As a result of Weaver's capturing of the WBA title, The Ring officially recognized WBC titleholder Larry Holmes as its heavyweight champion starting March 31, on the basis that Holmes had previously successfully defended his WBC title against Weaver.

== Fight card ==
Confirmed bouts:

Weight Class	Weight		vs.		Method	Round	Notes
Heavyweight	200+ lbs.	Mike Weaver	def.	John Tate (c)	KO	15/15	^{note 1}
Light Heavyweight	175 lbs.	Eddie Gregory	def.	Marvin Johnson (c)	TKO	11/15	^{note 2}
Welterweight	147 lbs.	Clinton Jackson	def.	Jimmy Heair	TKO	9/10
Super Middleweight	168 lbs.	Irving Hines	def.	Eddie Smith	KO	2/8
Heavyweight	200+ lbs.	Dwain Bonds	def.	Walter Santemore	SD	6

^Note 1 For WBA Heavyweight Title
^Note 2 For WBA Light Heavyweight Title

== Broadcasting ==
Country	Broadcaster
United States	ABC

Preceded by vs. Gerrie Coetzee	John Tate's bouts March 31, 1980	Succeeded by vs. Trevor Berbick
Preceded by vs. Scott LeDoux	Mike Weaver's bouts March 31, 1980	Succeeded by vs. Gerrie Coetzee
