= Mike Weaver vs. Gerrie Coetzee =

The Smash-Up in the Sun
- Date: October 25, 1980
- Venue: Superbowl, Sun City, South Africa
- Title(s) on the line: WBA heavyweight title

Tale of the tape
Boxer	Mike Weaver	Gerrie Coetzee
Nickname	Hercules	The Boksburg Bomber
Hometown	Diamond Bar, California, U.S.	Boksburg, South Africa
Purse	$2,200,000	$150,000
Pre-fight record	22–9 (14 KO)	23–1 (13 KO)
Age	29 years, 4 months	25 years, 6 months
Height	6 ft 1 in (185 cm)	6 ft 3 1/2 in (192 cm)
Weight	211 lb (96 kg)	227 lb (103 kg)
Style	Orthodox	Orthodox
Recognition	WBA; Heavyweight Champion	WBA; No. 1 Ranked Heavyweight

Result
- Weaver wins via 13th-round knockout

Mike Weaver vs. Gerrie Coetzee, billed as The Smash-Up in the Sun, was a professional match contested on October 25, 1980, for the WBA heavyweight title.

== Background ==
Nearly three months after defeating John Tate to capture the WBA heavyweight title, it was announced that Mike Weaver's first title defense would happen on October 25, 1980, against top-ranked heavyweight contender Gerrie Coetzee, with the bout taking place in Sun City, a resort town in Coetzee's native South Africa. As part of the deal, Weaver would collect an almost unheard of purse of $2.2 million, becoming only the third fighter to receive over $2 million for a fight after only Leon Spinks and Muhammad Ali, who were each paid over $3 million for their 1978 rematch. The Weaver–Coetzee bout would be the inaugural event to take place at the still-yet-to-be-built Superbowl Arena, which Sun City magnate Sol Kerzner funded for $8.8 million.

Odds for the fight were essentially even. Promoter Bob Arum declined to pick a winner, stating "The first man to get in a good punch is going to end up the winner. These guys are dead even." Famed boxing trainer Angelo Dundee, who helped call the action for CBS alongside Tim Ryan and Gil Clancy, echoed Arum's statements; "It is going to be a great fight. Someone is going to get knocked out, but I don't know which one. If you are a bettor, don't bet."

== Fight details ==
Coetzee got off to a strong start and won several of the early rounds as Weaver was bothered by the liniment that had been rubbed on Coetzee's body and shoulders, which got into his eyes, partially blinded him, caused him to blink uncontrollably and forced his corner to work feverishly to flush the substance out of Weaver's eyes, though the issue was seemingly resolved after the third round. Coetzee nearly stopped Weaver in the eighth round, stunning him with a big right hand that sent a hurt Weaver into the ropes, where Coetzee kept him pinned for the majority of the round, landing several powerful blows, though Weaver was able to withstand Coetzee's attack and ultimately survived the round without going down. From the ninth round on, Weaver took control as Coetzee seemingly tired and struggled to land any more sustained offense. Finally, midway through the 13th-round, Weaver countered a Coetzee right with a big right hook of his own that landed flush and sent Coetzee down in a heap. Coetzee would eventually get back to his feet, but was too late as the referee Jesus Celis had just reached the count of 10, giving Weaver the knockout victory at 1:49 of the round.

== Fight card ==
Confirmed bouts:

Weight Class	Weight		vs.		Method	Round	Notes
Heavyweight	200+ lbs.	Mike Weaver (c)	def.	Gerrie Coetzee	KO	13/15	^{note 1}
Welterweight	147 lbs.	Harold Volbrecht (c)	def.	Coenie Bekker	PTS	12	^{note 2}
Middlweight	160 lbs.	Ruben Hector Pardo	def.	Al Styles Jr.	PTS	10
Light Middleweight	154 lbs.	Charlie Weir	def.	Ray Hammond	RTD	5/10
Bantamweight	118 lbs.	Ramon Balbino Soria	def.	Welile Nkosinkulu	PTS	8
Cruiserweight	190 lbs.	Robbie Williams	def.	Rahim Muhammad	PTS	4

^Note 1 For WBA Heavyweight Title
^Note 2 For South African Welterweight Title

== Broadcasting ==
Country	Broadcaster
United States	CBS
United Kingdom	ITV

-

Preceded by vs. John Tate	Mike Weaver's bouts October 25, 1980	Succeeded by vs. James Tillis
Preceded by vs. Mike Koranicki	Gerrie Coetzee's bouts October 25, 1980	Succeeded by vs. George Chaplin
