= Carl Williams (boxer) =

American boxer

Personal information
- Nickname: The Truth
- Born: November 11, 1959 Belle Glade, Florida, U.S.
- Died: April 7, 2013 (aged 53) Valhalla, New York, U.S.
- Height: 6 ft 4 in (193 cm)
- Weight: Heavyweight

Boxing career
- Reach: 85 in (216 cm)
- Stance: Orthodox

Boxing record
- Total fights: 41
- Wins: 30
- Win by KO: 21
- Losses: 10
- No contests: 1
Medal record
Men's amateur boxing
Representing United States
World Cup
Gold medal – first place	1981 Montreal	Heavyweight
North American Championships
Gold medal – first place	1981 Shreveport	Heavyweight

Carl Williams (November 11, 1959 – April 7, 2013), nicknamed "the Truth", was an American boxer who competed as a professional from 1982 to 1997. He challenged twice for heavyweight world titles; the IBF title against Larry Holmes in 1985; and the undisputed title against Mike Tyson in 1989. At regional level he held the USBA heavyweight title from 1987 to 1991.

== Early years ==
"I've been fighting all my life. It was just a matter of deciding I wanted to pursue it in the ring instead of on the street,"

— Williams on his choice of boxing.

Williams spent his childhood in South Jamaica, Queens. He was raised by his grandmother. After his grandmother died, Williams began to box at the age of nineteen, training with the Daniel M. O'Connell Park Gym in Saint Albans, New York (also known as the New York City Recreations O'Connell Center), walking six miles (9.65 km) to his gym and back each day, and showing a natural talent and determination. "He's a natural, no question about that," said his trainer, Vic Hanson.

== Amateur career ==
With a couple of amateur fights under his belt Williams won two New York Golden Gloves Championships. Williams won both the 1980 New York Golden Gloves Sub-Novice Heavyweight Championship and the 1981 Heavyweight Open Championship.

=== Highlights ===
- Williams stopped (RSC 2) John Kibelka of the New York City Recreation in the finals of the 1980 Sub-Novice Heavyweight Championship.
- Three knockouts and one decision propelled Williams into the 1981 Golden Gloves. In 1981 Williams stopped (RSC-2) Ronald Turner of the 25th Precinct in the heavyweight finals of the 55th New York Golden Gloves at 2:08.
- Williams won the heavyweight Intercity Golden Gloves over Craig Bodzianowski of Chicago, April 27, 1981 at the Madison Square Garden. "punching like a cruise missile," in words of sports writer Tom Hanrahan

At that time he wanted to fight the '81 open champ, Mitch Green from Bronx, who has since turned pro.

His other notable achievements include:
Gold at the North American Championships (201 lbs), Shreveport, Louisiana, September 1981:

- 1/2: Defeated Patrick Fennel (Canada) RSC 3 (the fight was halted after a physician examined a cut over Fennell's eye and ruled he was too badly hurt to continue)
- Finals: Defeated Roberto Gomez (Cuba)

Gold at the Boxing World Cup (201 lbs), Montreal, Canada, November 1981:

- 1/2: Defeated Nam Hee Kim (South Korea) KO 1
- Finals: Defeated Alexander Yagubkin (Soviet Union) by unanimous decision, 5–0

Williams finished his amateur career with 22 fights, completing a record of 21–1.

== Professional career ==
Williams soon turned pro, signing a contract with Ron Katz of the Top Rank. After the initial successes, he moved to a suburban motel in White Plains, New York, in order to concentrate on training and to stay away from big-city temptations. He was trained by Carmen Graziano.

Williams' is perhaps best known for his memorable first title shot was against Larry Holmes, a fight he lost in a controversial decision. His next fight was a victory against Jesse Ferguson. He then suffered a devastating knockout loss to Mike Weaver, which took him sixteen months to regain his shape and get back to the ring.

Williams eventually fought Mike Tyson (whom he first faced in sparring sessions, August 1, 1983, with a professional record 11–0), in a battle for the undisputed heavyweight championship. The first round knockout loss to Tyson in 1989 was a devastating defeat for Williams. Midway through the round, Tyson slipped a jab from Williams and loaded up with one of the most devastating counter-punches of his career, smashing Williams and sending him down for an eight count. The referee waved off the fight and Williams immediately launched a mild protest to the official and ringside judges but to no avail. He believed that the fight was stopped too early and he was not given more of an opportunity to demonstrate to the official that he was not disoriented after the knock-down. In a post fight in-ring interview, Williams appeared to be uninjured, spoke clearly, and expressed his disappointment that he was not given the opportunity to "show my stuff." Williams also called for a rematch, however this never occurred.

After the defeat by Tyson, Williams became a journeyman heavyweight. His other notable fights include losses to Larry Holmes, Tim Witherspoon, Tommy Morrison, and Frank Bruno, and wins against Bert Cooper and Trevor Berbick.

Williams retired in 1997 with a professional record of 30–10–0–1 with 21 knockouts.

== After retirement ==
Williams worked for Allied-SpectaGuard in New York City at the World Trade Center as a security agent and field supervisor. After the September 11 attacks, Williams worked for Verizon in Queens, New York, as a security guard. Later he worked for Forte Security Group in New York City, as a security guard at the Copacabana and the nightclub Marquee New York until he became ill.

== Death ==
Williams died on April 7, 2013, of esophageal cancer. He was survived by a daughter, Carla, and a son, Daniel. He was predeceased by his 12-year-old daughter Nijah, who died of leukemia.

== References in popular culture ==
Williams was the inspiration for a parody character on the Fox program In Living Color, Carl "The Tooth" Williams, portrayed by Jamie Foxx, a boxer so named because he only had one tooth. Williams would live his everyday life in his boxing apparel, making all appearances while singing the opening line to "Nuthin' But a 'G' Thang."

== Professional boxing record ==
41 fights	30 wins	10 losses
By knockout	21	6
By decision	8	4
By disqualification	1	0
No contests	1	

No.	Result	Record	Opponent	Type	Round, time	Date	Location	Notes
41	Loss	30–10 (1)	Anthony Green	TKO	7 (8)	Oct 30, 1997	Capitol Theatre, Port Chester, New York, U.S.	
40	Win	30–9 (1)	Marion Wilson	UD	10	Jun 13, 1997	Capitol Theatre, Port Chester, New York, U.S.	
39	Win	29–9 (1)	Domingo Monroe	PTS	8	Nov 27, 1996	Whitman Armory, Whitman, Massachusetts, U.S.	
38	Win	28–9 (1)	Lou Turchiarelli	TKO	2 (12), 2:15	Aug 2, 1996	Huntington Hilton Hotel, Melville, New York, U.S.	
37	Win	27–9 (1)	Sean Hart	DQ	3 (10)	May 31, 1996	Hilton Rye Town Hotel, Rye Brook, New York, U.S.	
36	Loss	26–9 (1)	Melvin Foster	UD	10	Mar 17, 1995	Fernwood Resort, Bushkill, Pennsylvania, U.S.	
35	Loss	26–8 (1)	Alexandr Zolkin	TKO	7 (10), 2:55	Jul 22, 1994	Southern Belle Casino, Tunica Resorts, Mississippi, U.S.	Referee stopped the bout at 2:55 of the seventh round.
34	Loss	26–7 (1)	Frank Bruno	TKO	10 (10), 0:29	Apr 24, 1993	National Exhibition Centre, Solihull, England	
33	Loss	26–6 (1)	Tommy Morrison	TKO	8 (10), 2:10	Jan 16, 1993	Reno-Sparks Convention Center, Reno, Nevada, U.S.	
32	Win	26–5 (1)	Jimmy Lee Smith	TKO	3 (10), 2:59	Nov 3, 1992	Foxwoods Resort Casino, Ledyard, Connecticut, U.S.	
31	Win	25–5 (1)	Ossie Ocasio	UD	10	Aug 20, 1992	Trump Taj Mahal, Atlantic City, New Jersey, U.S.	
30	Loss	24–5 (1)	Jerry Jones	UD	10	Mar 22, 1992	Harrah's Marina Resort, Atlantic City, New Jersey, U.S.	
29	Win	24–4 (1)	Marshall Tillman	TKO	2 (10), 2:37	Jan 12, 1992	Harrah's Marina Resort, Atlantic City, New Jersey, U.S.	
28	NC	23–4 (1)	Kimmuel Odum	NC	10	Oct 15, 1991	Trump Plaza Hotel and Casino, Atlantic City, New Jersey, U.S.	Originally a UD win for Williams, later ruled an NC for unknown reasons
27	Loss	23–4	Tim Witherspoon	SD	12	Mar 8, 1991	Trump Taj Mahal, Atlantic City, New Jersey, U.S.	Lost USBA heavyweight title
26	Win	23–3	Melton Bowen	TKO	5 (12), 2:00	Jul 24, 1990	Trump Plaza Hotel and Casino, Atlantic City, New Jersey, U.S.	Retained USBA heavyweight title
25	Loss	22–3	Mike Tyson	TKO	1 (12), 1:33	Jul 21, 1989	Convention Center, Atlantic City, New Jersey, U.S.	For WBA, WBC, and IBF heavyweight titles
24	Win	22–2	Mike Rouse	TKO	3 (12), 1:20	Nov 10, 1988	Caesars Tahoe, Stateline, Nevada, U.S.	Retained USBA heavyweight title
23	Win	21–2	Trevor Berbick	UD	12	Jun 27, 1988	Convention Center, Atlantic City, New Jersey, U.S.	Retained USBA heavyweight title
22	Win	20–2	Rodney Frazier	TKO	1 (12), 2:56	Jan 27, 1988	Golden Hall, San Diego, California, U.S.	Retained USBA heavyweight title
21	Win	19–2	Mike Gans	TKO	7 (10), 0:41	Oct 17, 1987	Harrah's Marina Resort, Atlantic City, New Jersey, U.S.	
20	Win	18–2	Bert Cooper	RTD	7 (12), 3:00	Jun 21, 1987	Resorts International, Atlantic City, New Jersey, U.S.	Won USBA heavyweight title
19	Loss	17–2	Mike Weaver	TKO	2 (10), 2:37	Feb 16, 1986	Rensselaer Polytechnic Institute, Troy, New York, U.S.	
18	Win	17–1	Jesse Ferguson	TKO	10 (10), 0:37	Aug 31, 1985	Atlantis Hotel and Casino, Atlantic City, New Jersey, U.S.	
17	Loss	16–1	Larry Holmes	UD	15	May 20, 1985	Lawlor Events Center, Reno, Nevada, U.S.	For IBF and The Ring heavyweight titles
16	Win	16–0	James Tillis	UD	10	Oct 23, 1984	Atlantis Hotel and Casino, Atlantic City, New Jersey, U.S.	
15	Win	15–0	Terry Mims	TKO	3 (10), 2:14	Aug 9, 1984	Felt Forum, New York City, New York, U.S.	
14	Win	14–0	Lou Benson Jr.	RTD	2 (10), 3:00	Mar 7, 1984	Westchester County Center, White Plains, New York, U.S.	
13	Win	13–0	Percell Davis	TKO	4 (10), 2:20	Sep 9, 1983	Caesars Palace, Paradise, Nevada, U.S.	
12	Win	12–0	Woody Clark	UD	10	Aug 16, 1983	Playboy Hotel and Casino, Atlantic City, New Jersey, U.S.	
11	Win	11–0	David Jaco	RTD	1 (10), 3:00	Jun 30, 1983	Sands, Atlantic City, New Jersey, U.S.	
10	Win	10–0	Robert Hill	TKO	3 (8), 2:15	Apr 24, 1983	Showboat Hotel, Atlantic City, New Jersey, U.S.	
9	Win	9–0	Richard Cade	TKO	1 (8), 2:59	Feb 18, 1983	Felt Forum, New York City, New York, U.S.	
8	Win	8–0	Leroy Boone	UD	8	Dec 9, 1982	Felt Forum, New York City, New York, U.S.	
7	Win	7–0	Michael Greer	TKO	3 (8), 2:13	Oct 22, 1982	Felt Forum, New York City, New York, U.S.	
6	Win	6–0	David Starkey	TKO	3 (8), 2:57	Aug 20, 1982	Felt Forum, New York City, New York, U.S.	
5	Win	5–0	Barry Funches	TKO	6 (6), 2:40	Jun 11, 1982	Felt Forum, New York City, New York, U.S.	
4	Win	4–0	Donny Townsend	KO	1 (6), 1:29	May 28, 1982	Felt Forum, New York City, New York, U.S.	
3	Win	3–0	Louis Alexander	TKO	2 (6), 2:24	Apr 30, 1982	Felt Forum, New York City, New York, U.S.	
2	Win	2–0	Dwight Triplett	TKO	1 (6), 2:52	Mar 31, 1982	Felt Forum, New York City, New York, U.S.	
1	Win	1–0	Greg Stephany	UD	4	Jan 22, 1982	Felt Forum, New York City, New York, U.S.	

Achievements
Vacant Title last held by Tony Tucker	USBA heavyweight champion June 21, 1987 – March 8, 1991	Succeeded by Tim Witherspoon
