= Mani Vaka =

Tongan boxer (1947–2007)

Manitisa Vaka Kafalava (6 April 1947 - 21 July 2007) was a Tongan heavyweight boxer who won the Tongan Heavyweight title in 1969 and the South Seas Heavyweight title in 1973. He was ranked 7th in the world heavyweight division.

He made his boxing debut in November 1968. After defeating Filimone Naliva, Leweni Waqa, and Marika Nailvalu and winning the South Seas Heavyweight title he planned to move to Australia.

In December 2009 he was inducted into the Tonga National Sports Hall of Fame.
