= Leroy Jones (boxer) =

American boxer

Personal information
- Nicknames: Big, Bad
- Born: Leroy Jones; February 10, 1950 Meridian, Mississippi, U.S.
- Died: July 11, 2010 (aged 60) Los Angeles, California, U.S.
- Height: 6 ft 5 in (1.96 m)
- Weight: Heavyweight

Boxing career
- Reach: 80 in (203 cm)
- Stance: Orthodox

Boxing record
- Total fights: 27
- Wins: 25
- Win by KO: 13
- Losses: 1
- Draws: 1
- No contests: 0

Leroy Jones (February 10, 1950 – July 11, 2010) was an American heavyweight boxer who won the NABF heavyweight championship in 1978. He challenged Larry Holmes for the WBC heavyweight title in 1980.

== Boxing career ==
Jones' professional career began with a third-round knockout of John Scroggins on July 30, 1973. He put together 24 wins with 12 knockouts, including a 12-round points win over future world heavyweight champion Mike Weaver. The Weaver fight won Jones the NABF heavyweight championship, essentially the American title.

During his professional career it became apparent that Jones had a problem with conditioning, as he fought at weights ranging from 228 pounds in 1973 to 271 pounds in 1977.

On March 31, 1980, Jones got his weight down to 254.5 pounds to challenge Larry Holmes for the WBC heavyweight title. Jones was stopped in 8 rounds, on an eye injury that effectively ended his career.

Leroy Jones died in Los Angeles on July 11, 2010.

== Professional boxing record ==
25 Wins (13 knockouts, 12 decisions), 1 Loss (1 knockout), 1 Draw
| Result | Record | Opponent | Type | Round | Date | Location | Notes |
| Win | 25–1–1 | (United States) Jeff Shelburg | TKO | 2 | 26/08/1982 | (United States) Genesis Center, Gary, Indiana | |
| Loss | 24–1–1 | (United States) Larry Holmes | TKO | 8 | 31/03/1980 | (United States) Caesars Palace, Las Vegas, Nevada | For WBC World Heavyweight Title |
| Win | 24–0–1 | (United States) James J Beattie | KO | 4 | 14/07/1979 | (United States) Mile High Stadium, Denver, Colorado | |
| Win | 23–0–1 | (United States) Harry Terrell | PTS | 10 | 12/05/1979 | (United States) Las Vegas, Nevada | |
| Win | 22–0–1 | (Tonga) Fili Moala | UD | 10 | 26/01/1979 | (United States) Coliseum, San Diego, California | |
| Win | 21–0–1 | (United States) Mike Weaver | UD | 12 | 19/08/1978 | (United States) Las Vegas, Nevada | Won WBC NABF Heavyweight Title |
| Win | 20–0–1 | (United States) Gregory Johnson | UD | 10 | 14/09/1977 | (United States) Caesars Palace, Las Vegas, Nevada | |
| Win | 19–0–1 | (United States) John Dino Denis | PTS | 8 | 27/03/1977 | (United States) Randolph AFB, San Antonio, Texas | Pete Rademacher refereed the bout. |
| Win | 18–0–1 | (United States) Roy Wallace | TKO | 9 | 22/01/1977 | (United States) Civic Auditorium, Pensacola, Florida | |
| Draw | 17–0–1 | (Argentina) Pedro Lovell | PTS | 10 | 10/07/1976 | (United States) San Diego Sports Arena, San Diego, California | |
| Win | 17–0 | (Mexico) Alfredo Mongol Ortiz | TKO | 6 | 13/05/1976 | (United States) Albuquerque Civic Auditorium, Albuquerque, New Mexico | |
| Win | 16–0 | (United States) Jody Ballard | KO | 4 | 03/03/1976 | (United States) Silver Slipper, Las Vegas, Nevada | |
| Win | 15–0 | (United States) Art Robinson | KO | 2 | 13/09/1975 | (United States) Denver, Colorado | |
| Win | 14–0 | (United States) Larry Frazier | PTS | 10 | 09/07/1975 | (United States) Las Vegas, Nevada | |
| Win | 13–0 | (United States) George Johnson | PTS | 10 | 18/03/1975 | (United States) Honolulu, Hawaii | |
| Win | 12–0 | (United States) Jimmy Gilmore | PTS | 8 | 11/02/1975 | (United States) Hawaii International Center, Honolulu, Hawaii | |
| Win | 11–0 | (United States) Rico Brooks | PTS | 10 | 29/01/1975 | (United States) Las Vegas, Nevada | |
| Win | 10–0 | (Mexico) Eusebio Hernandez, Jr. | TKO | 6 | 18/10/1974 | (United States) Caesars Tahoe, Stateline, Nevada | |
| Win | 9–0 | (Tonga) Koli Vailea | KO | 4 | 24/09/1974 | (United States) Silver Slipper, Las Vegas, Nevada | |
| Win | 8–0 | (United States) Henry Culpepper | UD | 8 | 26/08/1974 | (United States) Silver Slipper, Las Vegas, Nevada | |
| Win | 7–0 | (United States) Jimmy Gilmore | PTS | 8 | 02/07/1974 | (United States) Las Vegas, Nevada | |
| Win | 6–0 | (United States) Bob Crutison | KO | 2 | 05/06/1974 | (United States) Las Vegas, Nevada | |
| Win | 5–0 | (United States) Lou Rogan | KO | 3 | 19/03/1974 | (United States) Denver, Colorado | |
| Win | 4–0 | (United States) Paul Solomon | KO | 1 | 13/02/1974 | (United States) Silver Slipper, Las Vegas, Nevada | |
| Win | 3–0 | (United States) Bobby Joe Anderson | KO | 1 | 23/01/1974 | (United States) Silver Slipper, Las Vegas, Nevada | |
| Win | 2–0 | (United States) Larry Frazier | PTS | 6 | 10/01/1974 | (United States) Caesars Tahoe, Stateline, Nevada | |
| Win | 1–0 | (United States) John Scroggins | TKO | 3 | 30/07/1973 | (United States) Cheyenne, Wyoming | |
