= Mike Weaver (boxer) =

American boxer (born 1951)

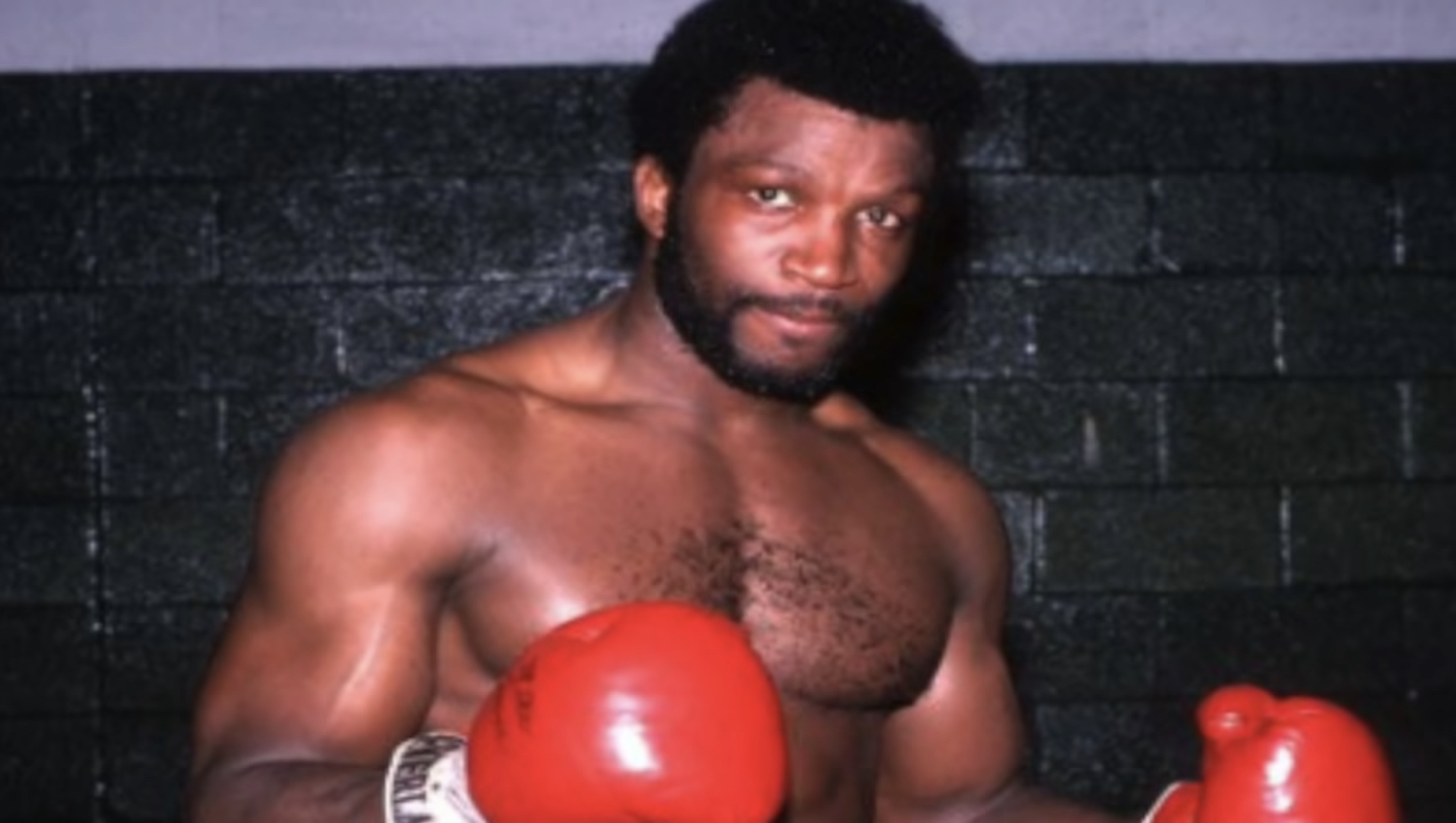
- Weaver (c. 1980)

Personal information
- Nickname: Hercules
- Nationality: American
- Born: Michael Dwayne Weaver; June 14, 1951 (age 75) Gatesville, Texas, U.S.
- Height: 6 ft 1 in (185 cm)
- Weight: Heavyweight

Boxing career
- Reach: 78 in (198 cm)

Boxing record
- Total fights: 60
- Wins: 41
- Win by KO: 28
- Losses: 18
- Draws: 1

Michael Dwayne Weaver (born June 14, 1951) is an American former professional boxer who competed from 1972 to 2000, and held the WBA heavyweight title from 1980 to 1982. He is widely regarded as one of the Best Heavyweight Boxers of the 1980s beating Heavyweight Champions such as Gerrie Coetzee and John Tate.

== Marines ==
Weaver was a member of the United States Marine Corps from 1968 to 1971, and went to Vietnam. During this time he started amateur boxing and training.

== Professional career ==
=== Early years ===
By 1972 Weaver was living and training in California, and took up professional boxing. In his early career, Weaver was considered a journeyman opponent. He was frequently brought in on short notice and overmatched against more experienced and developed contenders, and used as a sparring partner for Muhammad Ali and Ken Norton, who famously nicknamed him "Hercules" due to his top developed muscle definition.

In 1976 Weaver beat well regarded veteran Jody Ballard. In 1977 he defeated future cruiserweight contender Bill Sharkey, and in 1978 lost two close decisions. First to contender Stan Ward for the California State Heavyweight title, and then to Leroy Jones for the NABF heavyweight title.

=== Heavyweight contender ===
In late 1978 Weaver got a new team and manager and reeled off five straight knockouts, two of which came over top ranked opponents. In October 1978 he came off the floor to knock out hard hitting Colombian Bernardo Mercado in 5, and in January 1979 knocked out hulking old foe Stan Ward in 9 to win the USBA heavyweight title.

=== WBC heavyweight title challenge against Larry Holmes ===
These wins helped get him a high-profile world title fight against undefeated WBC champion Larry Holmes in New York's Madison Square Garden in June 1979. New cable channel HBO bought the rights to the fight as Weaver was so lowly-regarded the fight was seen as a mismatch and the networks didn't want anything to do with it (Weaver was 19–8 to Holmes' 30–0).

But, in a brutal contest, Weaver proved far better than expected, however, and gave Holmes a really tough battle. Holmes would rally by decking Weaver with a sharp uppercut in the 11th and in the 12th, Holmes pounded Weaver with powerful rights until the referee stopped the fight.

=== USBA heavyweight title contest ===
Although Weaver had lost, his performance raised his profile. Later that year, he retained USBA title with a 12-round decision over Scott LeDoux outboxing him. Weaver relied heavily on his jab, drawing positive reviews for his performance.

=== WBA heavyweight champion ===
In March 1980, Weaver fought John Tate for the WBA title, in Tate's backyard of Knoxville, Tennessee. Tate was an amateur star from the 1976 Olympic team. As a pro he had put together a 20–0 record and won the vacant WBA title by decisioning South African Gerrie Coetzee over fifteen rounds, in front of 86,000 hostile fans in Pretoria, South Africa.

Weaver vs. Tate produced one of the divisions finest knockouts ever. The taller Tate dominated Weaver for all the first 10 rounds. But then with sheer determination a battered Weaver suddenly turned it around, pushing Tate backward. But he'd left it too late, according to the commentators, as only 5 rounds remained and Tate was expected to resume his lead. However, with only 40 seconds left in the 15th round, Weaver caught Tate bouncing off the ropes towards him with a devastating left hook. It dropped Tate to the canvas out cold for well over a minute. Press pictures showed Tate sound asleep whilst Weaver did a handstand alongside to celebrate.

In October 1980 Weaver made his first defense, traveling to Sun City, South Africa, to fight Gerrie Coetzee. Weaver was hurt and nearly knocked down in the 8th round but rallied down the stretch and knocked Coetzee out in the 13th round. Coetzee, a good boxer/puncher, had never previously been down, amateur or pro.

In 1981 Weaver outpointed the spoiler James "Quick" Tillis over 15 rounds in Chicago to retain his title after a year's inactivity.

=== Losing the title to Michael Dokes; controversy ===
After another year's inactivity, Weaver took on highly regarded Michael Dokes in Las Vegas, December 10, 1982. Dokes came out fast and dropped Weaver inside the opening minute. As Weaver covered up on the ropes and Dokes missed a few swings, referee Joey Curtis stopped the fight after 1:03 had passed and awarded Dokes the victory by technical knockout. This caused controversy due to the timing of the stoppage, and many in the arena accused the fight of being fixed.

However, four weeks earlier, the fatal fight between Ray Mancini and Duk Koo Kim at Caesars' Palace had taken place where Kim died as a result of a brain injury. On the morning of the fight, Nevada State Athletic Commission officials warned all officials participating in the card to protect the health of the boxers in order to avoid another potential fight-related fatality, which Curtis responded, "Everybody has Duk Koo Kim in the back of his mind," referring to the November 13 fight, as Dr. Lonnie Hammargren, a doctor who had performed brain surgery in a futile attempt to save Kim, attended the meeting. (ESPN later ranked this the #7 worst bad call by a referee in a fight, doing so in 2008.)

Weaver was given a rematch with Dokes on May 20, 1983, which ended in a 15-round majority draw; judge Jerry Roth gave Dokes a four-point victory while judges Harold Lederman and Larry Hazzard had it even.

=== Further title challenges and later career ===
In June 1985 Weaver took on Pinklon Thomas, who then held the WBC title. Weaver lost by eighth-round knockout. This would be Weaver's last title challenge although a notable 2nd-round KO of Carl "The Truth" Williams a skilled boxer would follow the defeat to Thomas. Weaver continued to fight for another 15 years. His career ended at the age of 49 with a sixth-round KO rematch loss to Larry Holmes.

== Professional boxing record ==
60 fights	41 wins	18 losses
By knockout	28	12
By decision	12	6
By disqualification	1	0
Draws	1	

No.	Result	Record	Opponent	Type	Round, time	Date	Location	Notes
60	Loss	41–18–1	Larry Holmes	TKO	6 (10), 0:45	Nov 17, 2000	Coast Coliseum, Biloxi, Mississippi, U.S.	
59	Loss	41–17–1	Melvin Foster	TKO	9 (10)	Aug 8, 1998	Spirit Lake, North Dakota, U.S.	
58	Win	41–16–1	Derrick Ryals	UD	10	Mar 27, 1996	Warner Center Marriott, Woodland Hills, California, U.S.	
57	Win	40–16–1	George O'Mara	UD	12	Jun 21, 1995	Warner Center Marriott, Woodland Hills, California, U.S.	Retained NBA heavyweight title
56	Win	39–16–1	Bill Corrigan	RTD	2 (12), 3:00	Sep 17, 1994	Pavilhão do Colégio D. Bosco, Macau, SAR	Won vacant NBA heavyweight title
55	Win	38–16–1	Ladislao Mijangos	KO	2 (12), 1:50	Jun 6, 1994	Casino Magic, Bay St. Louis, Mississippi, U.S.	Won vacant International Boxing Authority heavyweight title
54	Win	37–16–1	Bert Cooper	UD	10	Feb 27, 1993	Capital Indoor Stadium, Beijing, China	Won vacant NBA heavyweight title
53	Win	36–16–1	Mike Gans	KO	5 (10)	Nov 17, 1992	Bakersfield, California, U.S.	
52	Loss	35–16–1	Lennox Lewis	KO	6 (10), 1:05	Jul 12, 1991	Caesars Tahoe, Stateline, Nevada, U.S.	
51	Win	35–15–1	Dion Burgess	TKO	5 (10), 2:58	Jul 18, 1990	Varsity Arena, Toronto, Ontario, Canada	
50	Loss	34–15–1	James Smith	UD	12	Apr 4, 1990	Madison Square Garden, New York City, New York, U.S.	Lost WBA Americas heavyweight title
49	Win	34–14–1	Philipp Brown	SD	12	Jul 27, 1989	Felt Forum, New York City, New York, U.S.	Retained WBA Americas heavyweight title
48	Win	33–14–1	Lionel Washington	TKO	1 (12), 1:48	May 1, 1989	Great Western Forum, Inglewood, California, U.S.	Won vacant WBA Americas heavyweight title
47	Win	32–14–1	Bobby Crabtree	KO	3 (10), 2:58	Jan 31, 1989	Country Club, Reseda, California, U.S.	
46	Loss	31–14–1	Johnny DuPlooy	KO	2 (10)	Apr 30, 1988	Superbowl, Sun City, Bophuthatswana	
45	Win	31–13–1	Johnny DuPlooy	RTD	6 (10)	Nov 28, 1987	Rand Stadium, Johannesburg, South Africa	
44	Win	30–13–1	James Pritchard	TKO	6 (10), 2:30	Aug 24, 1987	Louisville Gardens, Louisville, Kentucky, U.S.	
43	Win	29–13–1	David Jaco	KO	2 (10)	Jul 29, 1987	Yaounde, Cameroon	
42	Loss	28–13–1	Donovan Ruddock	SD	10	Aug 23, 1986	Cumberland County Memorial Auditorium, Fayetteville, North Carolina, U.S.	
41	Loss	28–12–1	James Smith	TKO	1 (10), 2:29	Apr 5, 1986	Coliseum, Colonie, New York, U.S.	
40	Win	28–11–1	Carl Williams	TKO	2 (10), 2:37	Feb 16, 1986	Rensselaer Polytechnic Institute, Troy, New York, U.S.	
39	Loss	27–11–1	Pinklon Thomas	KO	8 (12), 1:42	Jun 15, 1985	Riviera, Winchester, Nevada, U.S.	For WBC heavyweight title
38	Win	27–10–1	Tony Anthony	DQ	1 (10), 3:00	Nov 9, 1984	Riviera, Winchester, Nevada, U.S.	Anthony disqualified for hitting after the bell
37	Win	26–10–1	Billy Joe Thomas	TKO	7 (10), 1:16	Aug 31, 1984	Riviera, Winchester, Nevada, U.S.	
36	Win	25–10–1	Stan Ward	TKO	9 (15)	Sep 30, 1983	The Forum, Inglewood, California, U.S.	
35	Draw	24–10–1	Michael Dokes	MD	15	May 20, 1983	Dunes, Paradise, Nevada, U.S.	For WBA heavyweight title
34	Loss	24–10	Michael Dokes	TKO	1 (15), 1:03	Dec 10, 1982	Caesars Palace, Paradise, Nevada, U.S.	Lost WBA heavyweight title
33	Win	24–9	James Tillis	UD	15	Oct 3, 1981	Horizon, Rosemont, Illinois, U.S.	Retained WBA heavyweight title
32	Win	23–9	Gerrie Coetzee	TKO	13 (15), 1:49	Oct 25, 1980	Superbowl, Sun City, Bophuthatswana	Retained WBA heavyweight title
31	Win	22–9	John Tate	KO	15 (15), 2:15	Mar 31, 1980	Stokely Athletic Center, Knoxville, Tennessee, U.S.	Won WBA heavyweight title
30	Win	21–9	Scott LeDoux	UD	12	Nov 24, 1979	Metropolitan Sports Center, Bloomington, Minnesota, U.S.	Retained USBA heavyweight title
29	Win	20–9	Harry Terrell	KO	4 (10), 2:14	Sep 22, 1979	Memorial Sports Arena, Los Angeles, California, U.S.	
28	Loss	19–9	Larry Holmes	TKO	12 (15), 0:44	Jun 22, 1979	Madison Square Garden, New York City, New York, U.S.	For WBC heavyweight title
27	Win	19–8	Oliver Philipps	KO	4 (10), 1:52	Mar 2, 1979	Sahara, Reno, Nevada, U.S.	
26	Win	18–8	Stan Ward	RTD	9 (12), 0:01	Jan 18, 1979	Sahara Hotel and Casino, Winchester, Nevada, U.S.	Won inaugural USBA heavyweight title
25	Win	17–8	Abdul Khan	KO	2 (10), 2:33	Dec 5, 1978	Sahara, Reno, Nevada, U.S.	
24	Win	16–8	Bernardo Mercado	TKO	5 (10)	Oct 22, 1978	Sahara, Reno, Nevada, U.S.	Won vacant Nevada heavyweight title
23	Win	15–8	Mike Creel	KO	2 (10), 1:44	Sep 17, 1978	Sahara, Reno, Nevada, U.S.	
22	Loss	14–8	Leroy Jones	UD	12	Aug 19, 1978	Sahara Hotel and Casino, Winchester, Nevada, U.S.	For vacant NABF heavyweight title
21	Loss	14–7	Stan Ward	UD	12	Jan 24, 1978	Sacramento, California, U.S.	For vacant California heavyweight title
20	Win	14–6	Pedro Lovell	UD	10	Nov 15, 1977	Convention Center, Anaheim, California, U.S.	
19	Win	13–6	Dave Martinez	KO	1 (10)	Sep 13, 1977	Sports Arena, Anchorage, Alaska, U.S.	
18	Win	12–6	Bill Sharkey	MD	10	Apr 1, 1977	Beacon Theatre, New York City, New York, U.S.	
17	Win	11–6	Dwain Bonds	KO	8 (10), 2:58	Jan 19, 1977	Sahara Hotel and Casino, Winchester, Nevada, U.S.	
16	Win	10–6	Fonomanu Young Sekona	KO	6 (10)	Nov 4, 1976	Circle Star Theater, San Carlos, California, U.S.	
15	Win	9–6	Jody Ballard	MD	10	Jul 14, 1976	The Aladdin, Paradise, Nevada, U.S.	
14	Win	8–6	Tony Doyle	TKO	9 (10), 2:13	Jun 27, 1975	Coliseum, San Diego, California, U.S.	
13	Win	7–6	Mani Vaka	PTS	10	Aug 24, 1974	Neal S. Blaisdell Center, Honolulu, Hawaii, U.S.	
12	Loss	6–6	Duane Bobick	TKO	7 (10)	Jul 26, 1974	Coliseum, San Diego, California, U.S.	
11	Win	6–5	Orville Qualls	KO	2 (8), 0:57	May 31, 1974	Coliseum, San Diego, California, U.S.	
10	Loss	5–5	Rodney Bobick	UD	10	Mar 22, 1974	Coliseum, San Diego, California, U.S.	
9	Win	5–4	Ellis McKinley	PTS	6	Feb 21, 1974	Grand Olympic Auditorium, Los Angeles, California, U.S.	
8	Loss	4–4	Larry Frazier	KO	2 (6), 2:15	Dec 11, 1973	Civic Auditorium, San Francisco, California, U.S.	
7	Win	4–3	Bob Swoopes	KO	1 (6)	Nov 9, 1973	San Diego, California, U.S.	
6	Win	3–3	Tony Pulu	KO	2 (6)	Oct 11, 1973	Grand Olympic Auditorium, Los Angeles, California, U.S.	
5	Win	2–3	Lyn Martin	KO	1 (6), 1:30	Sep 10, 1973	The Forum, Inglewood, California, U.S.	
4	Loss	1–3	Billy Ryan	TKO	2 (4), 1:55	Feb 28, 1973	Warnors Theatre, Fresno, California, U.S.	
3	Win	1–2	Carlos Lopez	PTS	5	Feb 2, 1973	San Bernardino Arena, San Bernardino, California, U.S.	
2	Loss	0–2	Howard Smith	PTS	5	Oct 31, 1972	Civic Auditorium, Bakersfield, California, U.S.	
1	Loss	0–1	Howard Smith	KO	3 (4)	Sep 14, 1972	Grand Olympic Auditorium, Los Angeles, California, U.S.	

== Titles in boxing ==
=== Major world titles ===
- WBA heavyweight champion (200+ lbs)

=== Minor world titles ===
- NBA heavyweight champion (200+ lbs) (2×)
- International Boxing Authority heavyweight champion (Note: This was the first and only International Boxing Authority title fight. The organization was created so the Weaver vs Mijangos match could be billed as a title fight.) (200+ lbs)

=== Regional/International titles ===
- WBA Americas heavyweight champion (200+ lbs)
- USBA heavyweight champion (Note: Inaugural champion.) (200+ lbs)
- Nevada heavyweight champion (200+ lbs)

== Notes and references ==
=== References ===
Sporting positions
Regional boxing titles
Vacant Title last held by Earnie Shavers	Nevada heavyweight champion October 22, 1978 – 1981; Vacated	Vacant Title next held by Leroy Caldwell
New title	USBA heavyweight champion January 18, 1979 – March 1980; Vacated	Vacant Title next held by Greg Page
World boxing titles
Preceded by John Tate	WBA heavyweight champion March 31, 1980 – December 10, 1982	Succeeded by Michael Dokes
