= Larry Holmes =

American boxer (born 1949)

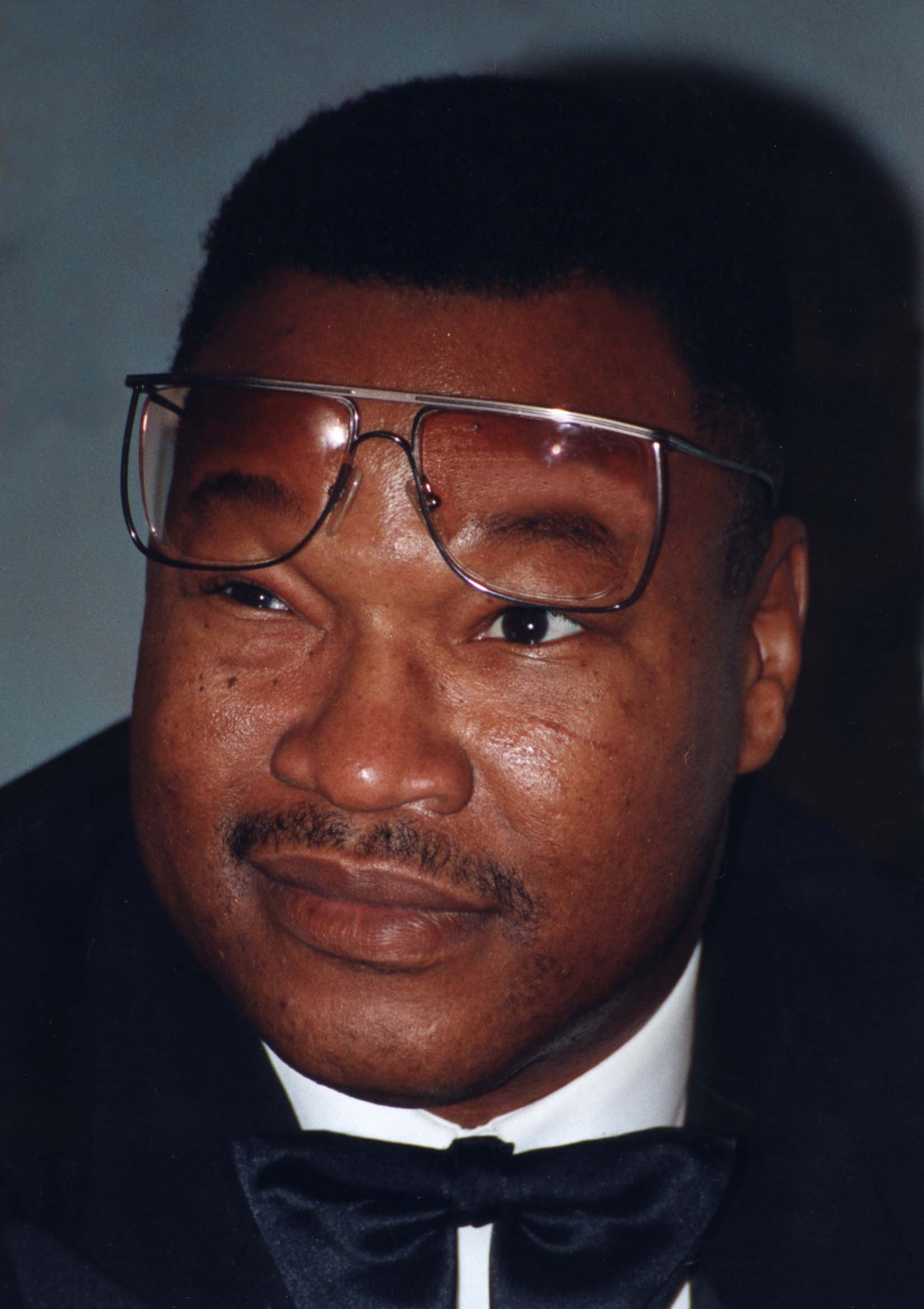
- Holmes in 1996

Personal information
- Nickname: The Easton Assassin
- Born: November 3, 1949 (age 77) Cuthbert, Georgia, U.S.
- Height: 6 ft 3 in (191 cm)
- Weight: Heavyweight

Boxing career
- Reach: 81 in (206 cm)
- Stance: Orthodox

Boxing record
- Total fights: 75
- Wins: 69
- Win by KO: 44
- Losses: 6

Larry Holmes (born November 3, 1949) is an American former professional boxer who competed from 1973 to 2002 and was world heavyweight champion from 1978 until 1985. He is often considered to be one of the greatest heavyweight boxers of all time. He grew up in Easton, Pennsylvania, which led to his nickname of "the Easton Assassin".

Holmes's left jab is often rated among the best in heavyweight boxing history. In addition to holding the WBC heavyweight title from 1978 to 1983, Holmes held the Ring magazine and lineal heavyweight titles from 1980 to 1985 and the inaugural IBF heavyweight title from 1983 to 1985.

Holmes won his first 48 professional bouts, including victories over Ken Norton (the man he defeated in 1978 for the WBC championship), Muhammad Ali, Earnie Shavers, Mike Weaver, Gerry Cooney, Tim Witherspoon, Carl Williams, and Marvis Frazier. Holmes fell one short of matching Rocky Marciano's career record of 49–0 when he lost to Michael Spinks in a 1985 upset. Holmes retired after losing a rematch to Spinks the following year but made repeated comebacks. He was unsuccessful in four further comeback attempts (against Mike Tyson in 1988, Evander Holyfield in 1992, Oliver McCall in 1995 and Brian Nielsen in 1997) to regain a variation of the heavyweight title. Holmes fought for the final time in 2002, at age 52, against the 334lb Eric "Butterbean" Esch and ended his career with a record of 69 wins and 6 losses, with all of his losses coming in world title fights.

Holmes is frequently ranked as one of the greatest heavyweights of all time and has been inducted into both the International Boxing Hall of Fame and World Boxing Hall of Fame. He is the only boxer to have defeated Muhammad Ali by stoppage and the last living boxer to have defeated him as a professional.

== Early life ==
Holmes was the fourth of twelve children born to John and Flossie Holmes. In 1954, the family moved to Easton, Pennsylvania, in the Lehigh Valley region on the state's border with New Jersey. Holmes' father went to Connecticut, where he visited the family every three weeks and worked as a gardener until his death in 1970. "He didn't forsake us", said Flossie Holmes. "He just didn't have anything to give." The family survived on welfare. To help support his family, Holmes dropped out of school when he was in the seventh grade and went to work at a car wash for $1 an hour. He later drove a dump truck and worked in a Lehigh Valley quarry.

== Amateur career ==
Holmes began boxing at age 18. In his twenty-first bout, he faced Nick Wells in the semifinals of the 1972 National Olympic Trials in Fort Worth, Texas. Wells, a southpaw known for an unprecedentedly high knockout-to-win ratio for an amateur, heavily ending bouts in the first round, added another with Holmes. On July 22, 1972, Wells knocked down Holmes twice and had him stumbling backwards before the referee stopped the bout awarding a TKO win to Wells. Nevertheless, Holmes was chosen by a selection committee of the National Olympic authorities to fight at the Olympic box-offs at West Point, New York, where he had a match-up versus Duane Bobick. Holmes was dropped in the first round with a right to the head. He got up and danced out of range, landing several stiff jabs in the process. Bobick mauled Holmes in the second round but could not corner him. The referee warned Holmes twice in the second round for holding. In the third, Bobick landed several good rights and started to corner Holmes, who continued to hold. Eventually, Holmes was disqualified for excessive holding.

== Professional career ==
=== Early years ===
After compiling an amateur record of 19–3, Holmes turned professional on March 21, 1973, winning a four-round decision against Rodell Dupree. Early in his career he worked as a sparring partner for Muhammad Ali, Joe Frazier, Earnie Shavers, and Jimmy Young. He was paid well and learned a lot. "I was young, and I didn't know much. But I was holding my own sparring those guys", Holmes said. "I thought, 'hey, these guys are the best, the champs. If I can hold my own now, what about later?'"

Holmes first gained credibility as a contender when he upset the hard-punching Earnie Shavers in March 1978. Holmes won by a lopsided twelve-round unanimous decision, winning every round on two scorecards and all but one on the third. Holmes's victory over Shavers set up a title shot between Holmes and WBC Heavyweight Champion Ken Norton in Las Vegas on June 9, 1978.

=== Defeating Norton and winning WBC heavyweight championship ===
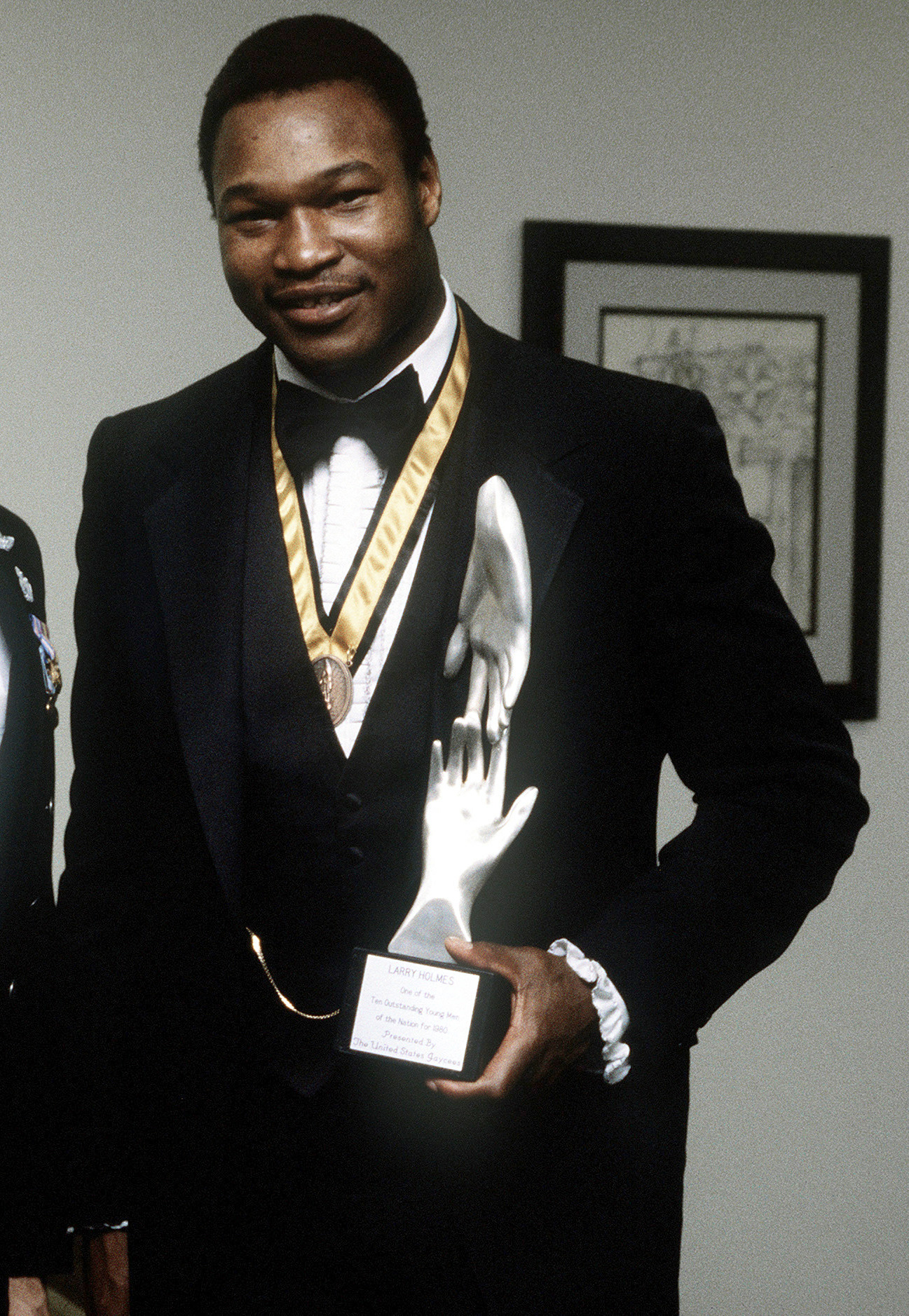
Holmes with the Jaycees Ten Outstanding Young Men trophy in December 1979

Holmes met Ken Norton for the WBC Championship on June 9, 1978. After fourteen rounds, all three judges had the fight scored dead even at seven rounds each. Holmes rallied late in the fifteenth to win it on two scorecards and take the title by a split decision.

In his first two title defenses, Holmes easily knocked out Alfredo Evangelista and Ossie Ocasio. His third was against future WBA Heavyweight Champion Mike Weaver, on June 22, 1979. With an uninspiring 19–8 record going into the fight, Weaver was lightly regarded. After ten tough rounds, Holmes dropped Weaver with a right uppercut late in round eleven. In the twelfth, Holmes immediately went on the attack, backing Weaver into the ropes and pounding him with powerful rights until the referee stepped in and stopped it. "This man knocked the devil out of me", Holmes said. "This man might not have had credit before tonight, but you'll give it to him now."

Three months later, on September 28, 1979, Holmes had a rematch with Shavers, who got a title shot by knocking out Norton in one round. Holmes dominated the first six rounds, but in the seventh, Shavers sent Holmes down with a devastating overhand right. Holmes got up, survived the round, and went on to punish Shavers in the eleventh round and the referee stopped the fight.

His next three defenses were knockouts of Lorenzo Zanon, Leroy Jones, and Scott LeDoux.

=== Defeating Ali ===
On October 2, 1980, at Caesars Palace in Las Vegas, Holmes defended his title against Muhammad Ali, who was coming out of retirement in an attempt to become the first four-time world heavyweight champion. Holmes dominated the 38-year-old Ali, winning every round on all three judges' scorecards. At the end of the tenth round, Ali's trainer stepped in to stop the fight as Holmes was inflicting major blows on Ali, handing Ali the only stoppage defeat of his career. After the win, Holmes received recognition as World Heavyweight Champion by The Ring.

Ali blamed his poor performance on thyroid medication which he had been taking, saying that it helped him lose weight (he weighed 217½, his lowest weight since he fought George Foreman in 1974), but it also left him drained for the fight.

Holmes seemed to show signs of sadness in punishing Ali so much during the fight. Tears appeared in Holmes's eyes during a post-fight interview. When asked why he was crying, he said that he respected Ali "a whole lot" and "he fought one of the baddest heavyweights in the world today, and you cannot take credit from him."

Holmes's trainer Richie Giachetti called Holmes's pummeling of Ali "awful ... the worst sports event I ever had to cover." Actor Sylvester Stallone was ringside for the fight and said that it was like watching an autopsy on a man who is still alive. The Holmes fight is said to have contributed to Ali's Parkinson's syndrome.

=== Defeating Berbick, Leon Spinks & Snipes ===
After eight consecutive knockouts, Holmes was forced to go the distance when he successfully defended his title against future WBC Heavyweight Champion Trevor Berbick on April 11, 1981. In his next fight, two months later, Holmes knocked out former Undisputed World Heavyweight Champion Leon Spinks in three rounds. On November 6, 1981, Holmes rose from a seventh-round knockdown, during which he staggered into the turnbuckle, to stop Renaldo Snipes in the eleventh.

=== Defeating Cooney ===
On June 11, 1982, Holmes defended his title against Gerry Cooney, the undefeated #1 contender and an Irish-American. The lead-up to the fight had many racial overtones, with promoter Don King and others hyping Cooney as the "Great White Hope." Holmes said that if Cooney wasn't white, he would not be getting the same purse as the champion (both boxers received $10 million for the bout). Although Cooney tried to deflect questions about race, members of his camp wore shirts that said "Not the White Man, but the Right Man." In their fight previews, Sports Illustrated and Time put Cooney on the cover, not Holmes. Boxing tradition dictates that the champion be introduced last, but the challenger, Cooney, was introduced last.

The bout was held in a 32,000-seat stadium erected in a Caesar's Palace Parking lot, with millions more watching around the world. After an uneventful first round, Holmes dropped Cooney with a right in the second. Cooney came back well in the next two rounds, jarring Holmes with his powerful left hook. Holmes later said that Cooney "hit me so damned hard, I felt it—boom—in my bones." Cooney was tiring by the ninth, a round in which he had two points deducted for low blows. In the tenth, they traded punches relentlessly. At the end of the round, the two nodded to each other in respect. Cooney lost another point because of low blows in the eleventh. By then, Holmes was landing with ease. In the thirteenth, a barrage of punches sent Cooney down. He got up, but his trainer, Victor Valle, stepped into the ring and stopped the fight.

After the fight, Holmes and Cooney became close friends.

=== Trouble with the WBC ===
Holmes's next two fights were one-sided decision wins over Randall "Tex" Cobb and ex-European champion Lucien Rodriguez. On May 20, 1983, Holmes defended his title against Tim Witherspoon, the future WBC and WBA Heavyweight Champion. Witherspoon, a six to one underdog and with only 15 professional bouts to his name, surprised many by giving Holmes a difficult fight. After twelve rounds, Holmes retained the title by a disputed split decision.

On September 10, 1983, Holmes successfully defended the WBC title for the sixteenth time, knocking out Scott Frank in five rounds. Holmes then signed to fight Marvis Frazier, son of Joe Frazier, on November 25, 1983. The WBC refused to sanction the fight against the unranked Frazier. They ordered Holmes to fight Greg Page, the #1 contender, or be stripped of the title. Promoter Don King offered Holmes $2.55 million to fight Page, but the champion didn't think that was enough. He was making $3.1 million to fight Frazier and felt he should get as much as $5 million to fight Page.

Holmes had an easy time with Frazier, knocking him out in the first round. The following month, Holmes relinquished the WBC championship.

=== IBF heavyweight champion ===
Despite his no longer being recognized by the WBC as champion, Holmes was still regarded as the lineal champion as well as being recognized as world champion by The Ring. On December 11, 1983, the newly formed International Boxing Federation extended recognition to Holmes, and he accepted.

As 1984 began, Holmes and Gerrie Coetzee, the WBA champion, were signed to unify the titles on June 15, 1984, at Caesars Palace. The fight was being promoted by JPD Inc., but it was canceled when Caesars Palace said the promoters failed to meet the financial conditions of the contract. Holmes was promised $13 million and Coetzee was promised $8 million. Even after cutting the purses dramatically, they still couldn't come up with enough financial backing to stage the fight. Don King then planned to promote the fight, but Holmes lost a lawsuit filed by Virginia attorney Richard Hirschfeld, who said he had a contract with Holmes that gave him right of first refusal on a Holmes-Coetzee bout. Holmes then decided to move on and fight someone else.

On November 9, 1984, after a year out of the ring, Holmes made his first defense of the IBF title, stopping James "Bonecrusher" Smith on a cut in the twelfth round. In the first half of 1985, Holmes stopped David Bey in ten rounds for his 19th title defense. His next against Carl "The Truth" Williams was unexpectedly tough. The younger, quicker Williams was able to out-jab the aging champion, who was left with a badly swollen eye by the end of the bout. Holmes emerged with a close, and disputed, fifteen-round unanimous decision.

=== Holmes vs. Michael Spinks 1 & 2 ===
Holmes's next fight had the potential to make boxing history. He agreed to terms to fight Michael Spinks, the undisputed champion at light heavyweight, for his twentieth world title defense September 21, 1985. A victory for Holmes would have tied Rocky Marciano's mark of 49 consecutive wins without a loss. Spinks, meanwhile, was looking to join Bob Fitzsimmons as the only other boxer at the time to win titles at both light heavyweight and heavyweight. In addition, if he defeated Holmes, Spinks would become the first ever reigning light heavyweight champion to win the heavyweight title.

Before the fight Archie Moore, the long-time light heavyweight champion who unsuccessfully challenged for the heavyweight crown himself twice, predicted an easy win for Holmes: "I'm afraid Larry will chew him up. Michael may be faster than Larry, but you can only go so fast." Despite the assessment, it indeed would be Spinks whose historical destiny would be fulfilled, as he defeated Holmes via unanimous decision to become the first reigning light heavyweight champion to win the heavyweight title. After the fight, a bitter Holmes said, "Rocky Marciano couldn't carry my jockstrap."

Holmes had a rematch with Spinks on April 19, 1986. Spinks retained the title with a disputed fifteen-round split decision. The judges scored the fight: Judge Joe Cortez 144–141 (Holmes), Judge Frank Brunette 141–144 (Spinks) and Judge Jerry Roth 142–144 (Spinks.) In a post-fight interview with HBO, Holmes said, "the judges, the referees and promoters can kiss me where the sun don't shine—and because we're on HBO, that's my big black behind."

On November 6, 1986, three days after his 37th birthday, Holmes announced his retirement.

=== Comebacks ===
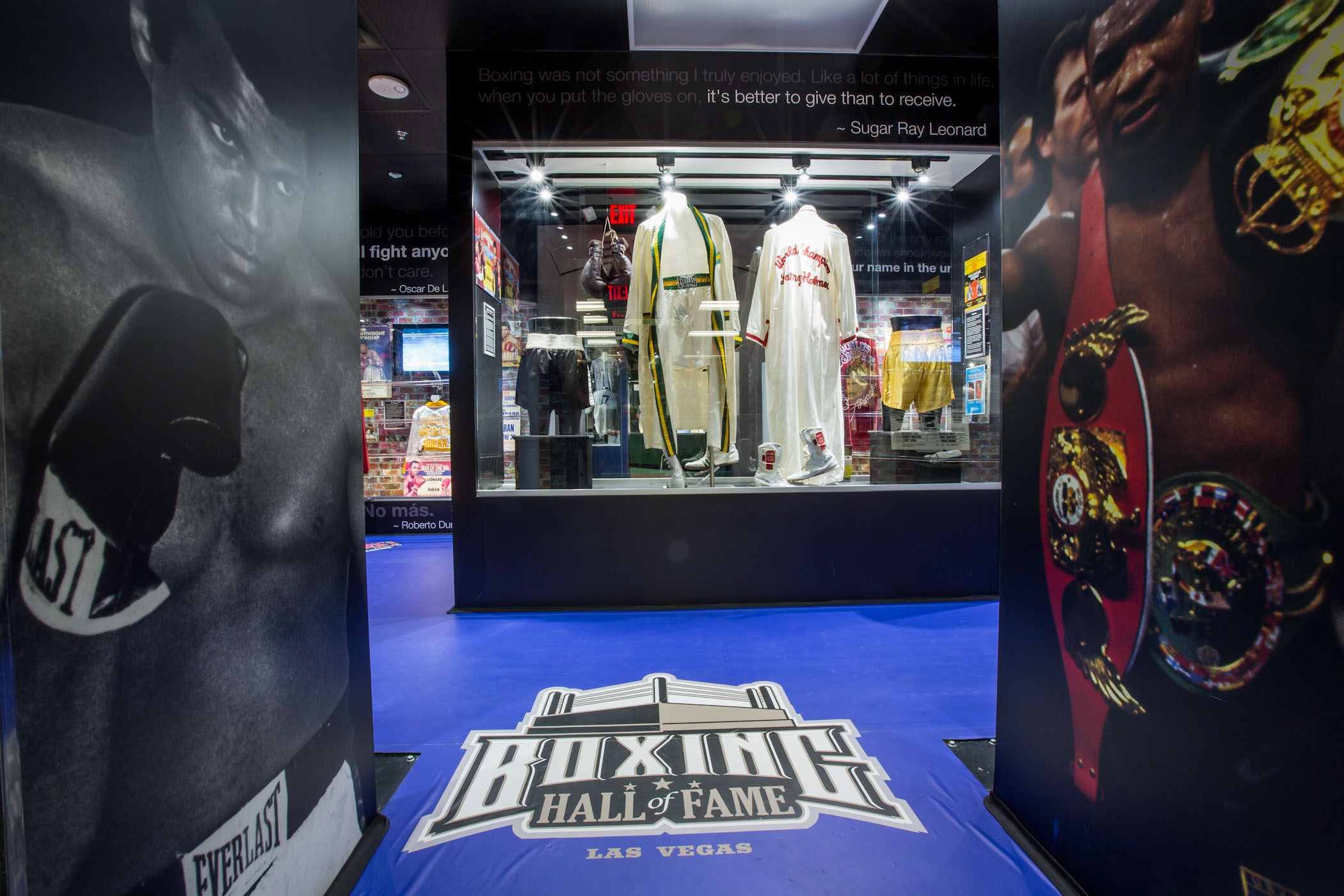
Several of Holmes's boxing robes on display at the International Boxing Hall of Fame in Canastota, New York in May 2013

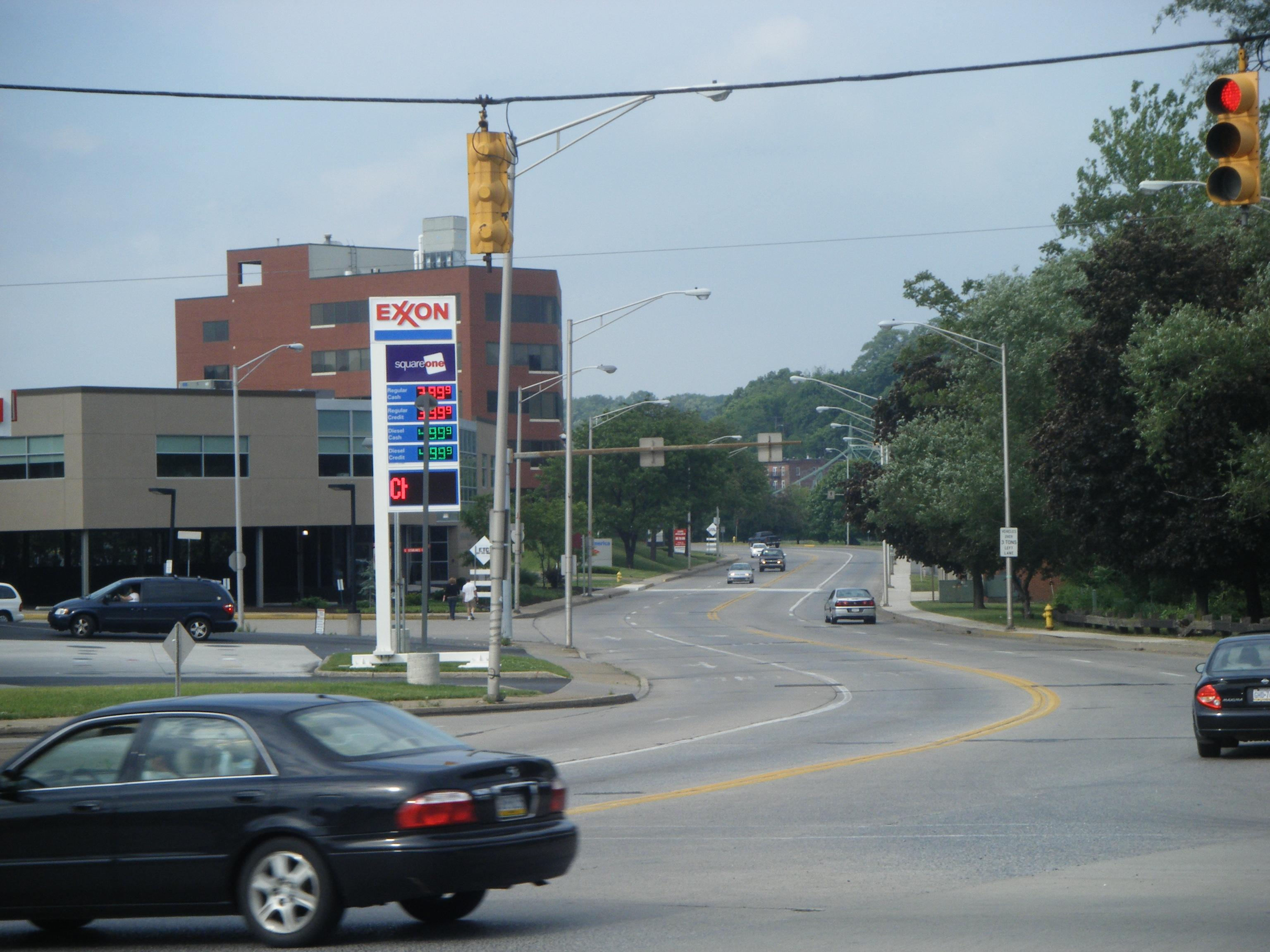
Larry Holmes Drive, an Easton, Pennsylvania street named in honor of Holmes, who was from Easton and fought under the nickname "The Easton Assassin"

On January 22, 1988, Holmes was lured out of retirement by a $2.8 million purse to challenge reigning Undisputed World Heavyweight Champion Mike Tyson. Tyson dropped Holmes in the fourth round with an overhand right. Holmes got up, but Tyson put him down two more times in the round, and the fight was stopped. It was the only time Holmes was knocked out in his career. After the fight, Holmes again retired.

Holmes returned to the ring in 1991 and became a much more active fighter, usually fighting on USA Tuesday Night Fights cards every few weeks against up and comers and journeymen. After five straight wins, he fought Ray Mercer, the undefeated 1988 Olympic Gold Medalist, on February 7, 1992. Holmes pulled off the upset and won by a 12-round unanimous decision. (Holmes later claimed that he fought Mercer in spite of having a detached retina.) The win got Holmes a shot at Evander Holyfield for the Undisputed World Heavyweight Championship. On June 19, 1992, Holyfield defeated Holmes by a twelve-round unanimous decision.

On April 8, 1995, he fought Oliver McCall for the WBC title. Holmes lost by a close 12-round unanimous decision. Two of the judges had him losing by one point, while the other judge had him losing by three points.

Holmes was back in the ring five months later, resuming the pace he had set since his comeback. However, he was growing tired of the sport and, after he fought and knocked out Anthony Willis in June 1996 on another USA boxing event, Holmes announced that unless he received a shot at the title, the fight against Willis was likely to be his last.

On January 24, 1997, Holmes got his last opportunity to fight for a heavyweight championship when he traveled to Copenhagen to fight undefeated International Boxing Organization champion Brian Nielsen. Nielsen won by a 12-round split decision to retain the title.

Holmes and George Foreman signed to fight on January 23, 1999, at the Astrodome in Houston. Foreman called off the fight several weeks before it was to take place because the promoter failed to meet the deadline for paying him the remaining $9 million of his $10 million purse. Foreman received a nonrefundable $1 million deposit, and Holmes got to keep a $400,000 down-payment of his $4 million purse.

Holmes's next two fights were rematches with old foes. On June 18, 1999, he stopped "Bonecrusher" Smith in eight rounds, and on November 17, 2000, he stopped Mike Weaver in six.

Holmes's final fight was on July 27, 2002, in Norfolk, Virginia, in which he defeated Eric "Butterbean" Esch in a 10-round unanimous decision.

== Post-boxing life ==
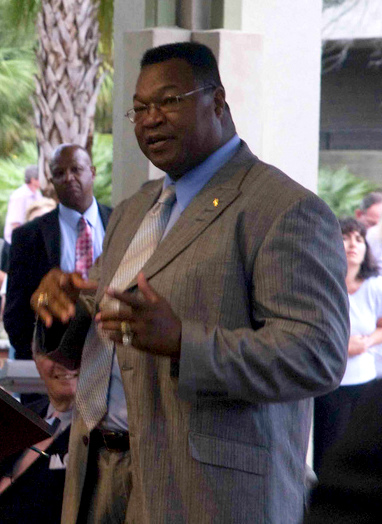
Holmes in September 2010 at the Beaufort, South Carolina, where Joe Frazier was awarded the Order of the Palmetto, the highest civilian awarded by the Governor of South Carolina

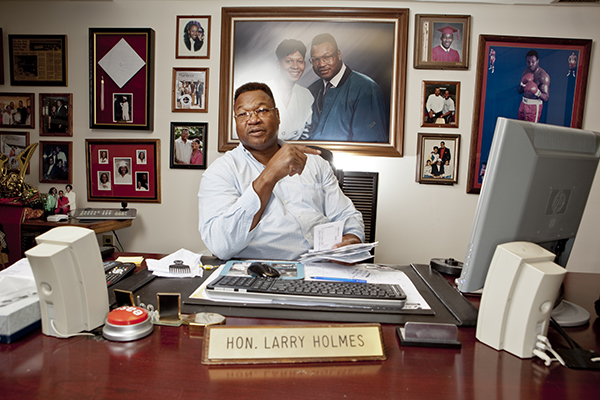
Larry Holmes in 2011

Holmes invested the money he earned from boxing and settled in his hometown of Easton. When he retired from boxing, Holmes employed more than 200 people through his various business holdings. In 2008, he owned two restaurants and a nightclub, a training facility, an office complex, a snack food bar and slot machines. As of 2009, Holmes co-hosted a talk show titled What the Heck Were They Thinking?

In 2014, Holmes sold his business complex in Easton to entrepreneur Gerald Gorman, CEO of mail.com.

In 2016, Holmes guest starred as himself in an episode of Mike Tyson Mysteries, titled "Unsolved Situations".

== Honors ==
Holmes was inducted into the International Boxing Hall of Fame in 2008.

== Personal life ==
In 1979, Larry Holmes married Diane Robinson, with whom he has two children. He also has three daughters from two previous relationships.

As of 2019, Holmes is living in Palmer Township, Pennsylvania, near Easton.

Holmes's younger brother, Mark Holmes, was a middleweight boxer from 1980 to 1987.

== Professional boxing record ==
75 fights	69 wins	6 losses
By knockout	44	1
By decision	25	5

No.	Result	Record	Opponent	Type	Round(s), time	Date	Location	Notes
75	Win	69–6	Eric Esch	UD	10	Jul 27, 2002	Scope, Norfolk, Virginia, U.S.	
74	Win	68–6	Mike Weaver	TKO	6 (10), 0:45	Nov 17, 2000	Coast Coliseum, Biloxi, Mississippi, U.S.	
73	Win	67–6	James Smith	TKO	8 (10), 2:00	Jun 18, 1999	Crown Coliseum, Fayetteville, North Carolina, U.S.	
72	Win	66–6	Maurice Harris	SD	10	Jul 29, 1997	The Theater at Madison Square Garden, New York City, New York, U.S.	
71	Loss	65–6	Brian Nielsen	SD	12	Jan 24, 1997	Brøndby Hall, Copenhagen, Denmark	For IBO heavyweight title
70	Win	65–5	Anthony Willis	KO	8 (10), 1:13	Jun 16, 1996	Casino Magic, Bay St. Louis, Mississippi, U.S.	
69	Win	64–5	Quinn Navarre	UD	10	Apr 16, 1996	Casino Magic, Bay St. Louis, Mississippi, U.S.	
68	Win	63–5	Curtis Sheppard	KO	4 (10), 2:41	Jan 9, 1996	Casino Magic, Bay St. Louis, Mississippi, U.S.	
67	Win	62–5	Ed Donaldson	UD	10	Sep 19, 1995	Casino Magic, Bay St. Louis, Mississippi, U.S.	
66	Loss	61–5	Oliver McCall	UD	12	Apr 8, 1995	Caesars Palace, Paradise, Nevada, U.S.	For WBC heavyweight title
65	Win	61–4	Jesse Ferguson	UD	10	Sep 8, 1994	Mystic Lake Casino Hotel, Shakopee, Minnesota, U.S.	
64	Win	60–4	Garing Lane	UD	10	Mar 8, 1994	Foxwoods Resort Casino, Ledyard, Connecticut, U.S.	
63	Win	59–4	José Ribalta	UD	10	Sep 28, 1993	Casino Magic, Bay St. Louis, Mississippi, U.S.	
62	Win	58–4	Paul Poirier	RTD	6 (10), 3:00	May 18, 1993	Casino Magic, Bay St. Louis, Mississippi, U.S.	
61	Win	57–4	Ken Lakusta	RTD	7 (10), 3:00	Apr 13, 1993	Casino Magic, Bay St. Louis, Mississippi, U.S.	
60	Win	56–4	Rocky Pepeli	RTD	4 (10), 3:00	Mar 9, 1993	Casino Magic, Bay St. Louis, Mississippi, U.S.	
59	Win	55–4	Everett Martin	UD	10	Jan 5, 1993	Coast Coliseum, Biloxi, Mississippi, U.S.	
58	Loss	54–4	Evander Holyfield	UD	12	Jun 19, 1992	Caesars Palace, Paradise, Nevada, U.S.	For WBA, WBC, and IBF heavyweight titles
57	Win	54–3	Ray Mercer	UD	12	Feb 7, 1992	Convention Hall, Atlantic City, New Jersey, U.S.	
56	Win	53–3	Jamie Howe	TKO	1 (10), 1:57	Nov 12, 1991	Coliseum, Jacksonville, Florida, U.S.	
55	Win	52–3	Art Card	UD	10	Sep 17, 1991	Marriott's World Center, Orlando, Florida, U.S.	
54	Win	51–3	Michael Greer	KO	4 (10), 1:18	Aug 24, 1991	Neal S. Blaisdell Arena, Honolulu, Hawaii, U.S.	
53	Win	50–3	Eddie Gonzales	UD	10	Aug 13, 1991	Hyatt Regency, Tampa, Florida, U.S.	
52	Win	49–3	Tim Anderson	TKO	1 (10), 2:03	Apr 7, 1991	The Diplomat, Hollywood, Florida, U.S.	
51	Loss	48–3	Mike Tyson	TKO	4 (12), 2:55	Jan 22, 1988	Convention Hall, Atlantic City, New Jersey, U.S.	For WBA, WBC, and IBF heavyweight titles
50	Loss	48–2	Michael Spinks	SD	15	Apr 19, 1986	Las Vegas Hilton, Winchester, Nevada, U.S.	For IBF and The Ring heavyweight titles
49	Loss	48–1	Michael Spinks	UD	15	Sep 21, 1985	Riviera, Winchester, Nevada, U.S.	Lost IBF and The Ring heavyweight titles
48	Win	48–0	Carl Williams	UD	15	May 20, 1985	Lawlor Events Center, Reno, Nevada, U.S.	Retained IBF and The Ring heavyweight titles
47	Win	47–0	David Bey	TKO	10 (15), 2:58	Mar 15, 1985	Riviera, Winchester, Nevada, U.S.	Retained IBF and The Ring heavyweight titles
46	Win	46–0	James Smith	TKO	12 (15), 2:10	Nov 9, 1984	Riviera, Winchester, Nevada, U.S.	Retained IBF and The Ring heavyweight titles
45	Win	45–0	Marvis Frazier	TKO	1 (12), 2:57	Nov 25, 1983	Caesars Palace, Paradise, Nevada, U.S.	Retained The Ring heavyweight title
44	Win	44–0	Scott Frank	TKO	5 (12), 1:28	Sep 10, 1983	Broadway by the Bay Theater, Atlantic City, New Jersey, U.S.	Retained WBC and The Ring heavyweight titles
43	Win	43–0	Tim Witherspoon	SD	12	May 20, 1983	Dunes, Paradise, Nevada, U.S.	Retained WBC and The Ring heavyweight titles
42	Win	42–0	Lucien Rodriguez	UD	12	Mar 27, 1983	Watres Armory, Scranton, Pennsylvania, U.S.	Retained WBC and The Ring heavyweight titles
41	Win	41–0	Randall Cobb	UD	15	Nov 26, 1982	Astrodome, Houston, Texas, U.S.	Retained WBC and The Ring heavyweight titles
40	Win	40–0	Gerry Cooney	TKO	13 (15), 2:52	Jun 11, 1982	Caesars Palace, Paradise, Nevada, U.S.	Retained WBC and The Ring heavyweight titles
39	Win	39–0	Renaldo Snipes	TKO	11 (15), 1:05	Nov 6, 1981	Civic Arena, Pittsburgh, Pennsylvania, U.S.	Retained WBC and The Ring heavyweight titles
38	Win	38–0	Leon Spinks	TKO	3 (15), 2:34	Jun 12, 1981	Joe Louis Arena, Detroit, Michigan, U.S.	Retained WBC and The Ring heavyweight titles
37	Win	37–0	Trevor Berbick	UD	15	Apr 11, 1981	Caesars Palace, Paradise, Nevada, U.S.	Retained WBC and The Ring heavyweight titles
36	Win	36–0	Muhammad Ali	RTD	10 (15), 3:00	Oct 2, 1980	Caesars Palace, Paradise, Nevada, U.S.	Retained WBC and The Ring heavyweight titles
35	Win	35–0	Scott LeDoux	TKO	7 (15), 2:05	Jul 7, 1980	Metropolitan Sports Center, Bloomington, Minnesota, U.S.	Retained WBC and The Ring heavyweight titles
34	Win	34–0	Leroy Jones	TKO	8 (15), 2:56	Mar 31, 1980	Caesars Palace, Paradise, Nevada, U.S.	Retained WBC heavyweight title
33	Win	33–0	Lorenzo Zanon	KO	6 (15), 2:39	Feb 3, 1980	Caesars Palace, Paradise, Nevada, U.S.	Retained WBC heavyweight title
32	Win	32–0	Earnie Shavers	TKO	11 (15), 2:00	Sep 28, 1979	Caesars Palace, Paradise, Nevada, U.S.	Retained WBC heavyweight title
31	Win	31–0	Mike Weaver	TKO	12 (15), 0:44	Jun 22, 1979	Madison Square Garden, New York City, New York, U.S.	Retained WBC heavyweight title
30	Win	30–0	Ossie Ocasio	TKO	7 (15), 2:38	Mar 23, 1979	Hilton, Winchester, Nevada, U.S.	Retained WBC heavyweight title
29	Win	29–0	Alfredo Evangelista	KO	7 (15), 2:14	Nov 10, 1978	Caesars Palace, Paradise, Nevada, U.S.	Retained WBC heavyweight title
28	Win	28–0	Ken Norton	SD	15	Jun 9, 1978	Caesars Palace, Paradise, Nevada, U.S.	Won WBC heavyweight title
27	Win	27–0	Earnie Shavers	UD	12	Mar 25, 1978	Caesars Palace, Paradise, Nevada, U.S.	
26	Win	26–0	Ibar Arrington	TKO	10 (10), 1:38	Nov 5, 1977	Caesars Palace, Paradise, Nevada, U.S.	
25	Win	25–0	Fred Houpe	TKO	7 (10), 0:47	Sep 14, 1977	Caesars Palace, Paradise, Nevada, U.S.	
24	Win	24–0	Horace Robinson	TKO	5 (10)	Mar 17, 1977	Roberto Clemente Coliseum, San Juan, Puerto Rico	
23	Win	23–0	Tom Prater	UD	8	Jan 16, 1977	USS Lexington, Pensacola, Florida, U.S.	
22	Win	22–0	Roy Williams	UD	10	Apr 30, 1976	Capital Centre, Landover, Maryland, U.S.	
21	Win	21–0	Fred Askew	TKO	2 (10), 2:18	Apr 5, 1976	Capital Centre, Landover, Maryland, U.S.	
20	Win	20–0	Joe Gholston	TKO	8 (10), 2:32	Jan 29, 1976	Allan P. Kirby Field House, Easton, Pennsylvania, U.S.	
19	Win	19–0	Billy Joiner	TKO	3 (10), 2:29	Dec 20, 1975	Roberto Clemente Coliseum, San Juan, Puerto Rico	
18	Win	18–0	Leon Shaw	KO	1 (10)	Dec 9, 1975	D.C. Armory, Washington, D.C., U.S.	
17	Win	17–0	Rodney Bobick	TKO	6 (10), 2:46	Oct 1, 1975	Araneta Coliseum, Quezon City, Philippines	
16	Win	16–0	Charlie James	PTS	10	Aug 26, 1975	International Center, Honolulu, Hawaii, U.S.	
15	Win	15–0	Obie English	TKO	7 (10)	Aug 16, 1975	Catholic Youth Center, Scranton, Pennsylvania, U.S.	
14	Win	14–0	Ernie Smith	KO	3 (8)	May 16, 1975	Convention Center, Winchester, Nevada, U.S.	
13	Win	13–0	Robert Yarborough	KO	4, 2:58	Apr 26, 1975	Maple Leaf Gardens, Toronto, Ontario, Canada	
12	Win	12–0	Oliver Wright	TKO	3	Apr 9, 1975	International Center, Honolulu, Hawaii, U.S.	
11	Win	11–0	Charley Green	KO	1 (8), 1:57	Mar 24, 1975	Coliseum, Richfield, Ohio, U.S.	
10	Win	10–0	Joe Hathaway	TKO	1 (8), 2:47	Dec 11, 1974	Catholic Youth Center, Scranton, Pennsylvania, U.S.	
9	Win	9–0	Bob Mashburn	TKO	7 (8)	May 29, 1974	Catholic Youth Center, Scranton, Pennsylvania, U.S.	
8	Win	8–0	Howard Darlington	TKO	4 (6), 2:23	Apr 24, 1974	Catholic Youth Center, Scranton, Pennsylvania, U.S.	
7	Win	7–0	Kevin Isaac	TKO	3 (6), 1:05	Nov 28, 1973	Cleveland Arena, Cleveland, Ohio, U.S.	
6	Win	6–0	Jerry Judge	PTS	6	Nov 14, 1973	Catholic Youth Center, Scranton, Pennsylvania, U.S.	
5	Win	5–0	Bob Bozic	PTS	6	Sep 10, 1973	Madison Square Garden, New York City, New York, U.S.	
4	Win	4–0	Don Branch	PTS	6	Aug 22, 1973	Catholic Youth Center, Scranton, Pennsylvania, U.S.	
3	Win	3–0	Curtis Whitner	TKO	1 (4), 2:14	Jun 20, 1973	Catholic Youth Center, Scranton, Pennsylvania, U.S.	
2	Win	2–0	Art Savage	TKO	3 (4), 1:32	May 2, 1973	Catholic Youth Center, Scranton, Pennsylvania, U.S.	
1	Win	1–0	Rodell Dupree	PTS	4	Mar 21, 1973	Catholic Youth Center, Scranton, Pennsylvania, U.S.	

== Exhibition boxing record ==
8 fights	0 wins	0 losses
Non-scored	8	

No.	Result	Record	Opponent	Type	Round(s), time	Date	Location	Notes
8	—N/a	0–0 (8)	Ron McCarthy	—N/a	3	Jan 16, 2004	Boutwell Memorial Auditorium, Birmingham, Alabama, U.S.	Non-scored bout
7	—N/a	0–0 (7)	James Tillis	—N/a	2	Mar 18, 1990	Jakarta, Indonesia	Non-scored bout
6	—N/a	0–0 (6)	Bernardo Mercado	—N/a	2	Mar 18, 1990	Jakarta, Indonesia	Non-scored bout
5	—N/a	0–0 (5)	Tim Anderson	—N/a	4	Nov 10, 1989	Jacksonville, Florida, U.S.	Non-scored bout
4	—N/a	0–0 (4)	Floyd Cummings	—N/a	4	Mar 27, 1982	Playboy Hotel & Casino, Atlantic City, New Jersey, U.S.	Non-scored bout
3	—N/a	0–0 (3)	Mitch Green	—N/a	2	Mar 27, 1982	Playboy Hotel & Casino, Atlantic City, New Jersey, U.S.	Non-scored bout
2	—N/a	0–0 (2)	Jody Ballard	—N/a	2	Feb 2, 1979	Allentown, Pennsylvania, U.S.	Non-scored bout
1	—N/a	0–0 (1)	Wendell Baily	—N/a	2	Feb 2, 1979	Allentown, Pennsylvania, U.S.	Non-scored bout

== Titles in boxing ==
=== Major world titles ===
- WBC heavyweight champion (200+ lbs)
- IBF heavyweight champion (Note: Awarded inaugural title on December 11, 1983.) (200+ lbs)

=== The Ring magazine titles ===
- The Ring heavyweight champion (200+ lbs)

== See also ==
- List of heavyweight boxing champions
- List of WBC world champions
- List of IBF world champions
- List of The Ring world champions

== Notes and references ==
=== References ===
Sporting positions
World boxing titles
Preceded by Ken Norton	WBC heavyweight champion June 9, 1978 – December 11, 1983; Vacated	Vacant Title next held by Tim Witherspoon
Vacant Title last held by Muhammad Ali	The Ring heavyweight champion October 10, 1980 – September 21, 1985	Succeeded by Michael Spinks
Inaugural champion	IBF heavyweight champion December 11, 1983 – September 21, 1985	Succeeded by Michael Spinks
