= Wollheim =

Wollheim, Wolheim, Walheim, and Wahlheim may refer to:

== People ==
- A. E. Wollheim da Fonseca (1810–1884), German writer
- Betsy Wollheim (born 1951), American science fiction editor
- Donald A. Wollheim (1914–1990), American science fiction writer
- Donald Walheim (born 1939), American heavyweight boxer
- Gert Heinrich Wollheim (1894–1974), German painter
- Hermine Feist-Wollheim (1855–1933), German porcelain collector
- Kristina da Fonseca-Wollheim (born 1972), German runner
- Louis Wolheim (1880–1931), American character actor
- Norbert Wollheim (1913–1998), American accountant and tax advisor
- Rex J. Walheim (born 1962), American pilot and astronaut
- Richard Wollheim (1923−2003), British philosopher

== Places ==
- Walheim, town in Baden-Württemberg, Germany
- Walheim, Haut-Rhin, commune in France
- Kornelimünster/Walheim, borough of Aachen, Germany
- Wahlheim, a village in Rhineland-Palatinate, Germany

== Other ==
- Wollheim's paradox, philosophical problem
- Wollheim Memorial, Holocaust memorial site in Frankfurt am Main

== See also ==
- Waldheim, disambiguation page
