= George Foreman vs. Ken Norton =

Boxing competition

- Date: March 26, 1974
- Venue: Poliedro de Caracas, Caracas, Venezuela
- Title(s) on the line: WBA, WBC and The Ring undisputed heavyweight championship

Tale of the tape
Boxer	George Foreman	Ken Norton
Nickname	Big	The Black Hercules
Hometown	Houston, Texas	San Diego, California
Purse	$700,000	$200,000
Pre-fight record	39–0 (36 KO)	30–2 (23 KO)
Age	25 years, 2 months	30 years, 7 months
Height	6 ft 4 in (193 cm)	6 ft 3 in (191 cm)
Weight	224 lb (102 kg)	212 lb (96 kg)
Style	Orthodox	Orthodox
Recognition	WBA, WBC and The Ring undisputed Heavyweight Champion	

Result
- Foreman wins via 2nd-round TKO

George Foreman vs. Ken Norton was a professional boxing match contested on March 26, 1974, for the undisputed heavyweight championship.

== Background ==
Undefeated heavyweight champion George Foreman had little trouble in his two fights the previous year. First he captured the WBA and WBC heavyweight titles after dominating Joe Frazier, scoring six knockdowns in less than two rounds in an easy technical knockout victory in January 1973. Foreman would follow this by making his first defense against José Roman in Tokyo in September of that year, easily winning the bout by first-round knockout. For his second defense, Foreman was matched up against Ken Norton for a March 1974 bout held in Caracas, the capital and largest city in Venezuela. Ken Norton was coming off two successive fights against Muhammad Ali in 1973, winning the first fight in March by split decision (famously breaking Ali's jaw in the process), and then narrowly losing the second by another split decision in September. Norton's impressive performances against Ali made him one of the top heavyweight contenders for Foreman's titles, but the future hall-of-famer was installed as a 3–1 underdog against the hard-hitting champion and given little chance of obtaining a victory. A week before the fight had happened, promoter Don King, banking on a victory by Foreman, had already signed a deal that would see Foreman make his next defense against Ali in the "Rumble in the Jungle."

A 3 to 1 underdog, Norton was back in a familiar position, promised less money than Foreman ($200,000 to the $500,000 George was guaranteed), and deemed a solid underdog to the hard-slugging Texan. If Caracas seems like a strange destination to hold a heavyweight boxing event, there was a practical reason it was sought out as the host: an agreement had been reached stipulating all taxes would be waived.

Don King produced the initial guarantee, a $10million letter of credit from Carl Lombardo, a 34‐year‐old Cleveland construction millionaire. King earlier had persuaded Lombardo to put up $400,000 for the Foreman‐Norton bout here.

== The fight ==
The fight would last less than two rounds with Foreman scoring his third consecutive knockout victory to retain the heavyweight titles. The two fighters fought an even first round, but Foreman quickly gained an upper hand in the second and sent Norton to the canvas three times in the round. Foreman stunned Norton about a minute into the round and followed it up with a combination that sent Norton down into the ropes for the first knockdown. Norton was able to continue the fight, but Foreman continued his attack and quickly sent Norton back down with a left hand to the head. Norton would again get back up and continue but was once again attacked by Foreman who put Norton flat on his back with another combination. Norton would get back up, but referee Jimmy Rondeau decided to call the fight and Foreman was declared the victor by technical knockout (TKO) at exactly two minutes of the second round.

== Aftermath ==
There was considerable controversy after the fight as both fighters ran into unexpected trouble with the Venezuelan government. The fight had been made in Venezuela on the basis that all taxes would be waived. However, a day after the fight, the government reneged the offer and insisted that they collect 18% of the fighter's purses, which was $700,000 for Foreman and $200,000 for Norton. Authorities stopped both men at the airport and neither could leave the country unless they posted bonds for the tax money. Norton settled his dispute first, paying $47,000 in taxes and posting a $60,000 bond which enabled him to leave the country on March 29. Foreman, however, remained in the country as Venezuelan government demanded no less $150,000 in taxes from his purse. After five days of negotiations, Foreman's camp was finally allowed leave on April 1. The tax problems ultimately led to the fight being dubbed "The Caracas Caper."

== Undercard ==
Confirmed bouts:

== Broadcasting ==
Country	Broadcaster
United States	ABC

Preceded by vs. José Roman	George Foreman's bouts 26 March 1974	Succeeded by vs. Muhammad Ali
Preceded by vs. Muhammad Ali II	Ken Norton's bouts 26 March 1974	Succeeded by vs. Boone Kirkman
