= George Foreman =

American boxer (1949–2025)

The Reverend George Foreman
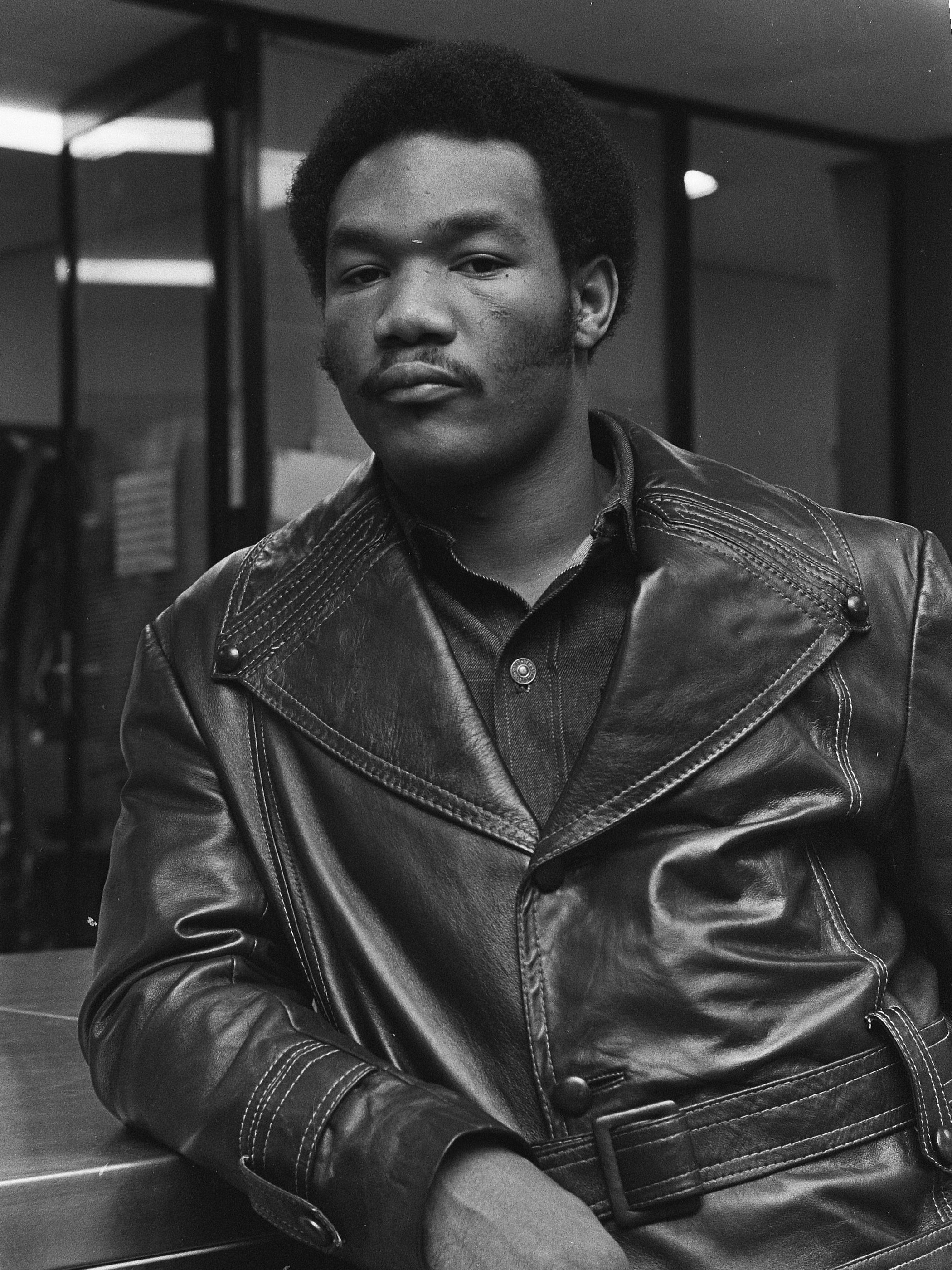
- Foreman in 1973

Personal information
- Nickname: Big George
- Born: George Edward Foreman; January 10, 1949 Marshall, Texas, U.S.
- Died: March 21, 2025 (aged 76) Houston, Texas, U.S.
- Height: 6 ft 3 in (191 cm)
- Weight: Heavyweight
- Spouses: Adrienne Calhoun (m. 1971–1974) Cynthia Lewis (m. 1977–1979) Sharon Goodson (m. 1981–1982) Andrea Skeete (m. 1982–1985) Mary Joan Martelly (m. 1985–2025)
- Children: 12

Boxing career
- Reach: 78 1/2 in (199 cm)
- Stance: Orthodox

Boxing record
- Total fights: 81
- Wins: 76
- Win by KO: 68
- Losses: 5
Medal record
Men's amateur boxing
Representing United States
Olympic Games
Gold medal – first place	1968 Mexico City	Heavyweight

George Edward Foreman (January 10, 1949 – March 21, 2025) was an American professional boxer, businessman, minister, and author. In boxing, he competed between 1967 and 1997, and was nicknamed "Big George". He was a two-time world heavyweight champion and an Olympic gold medalist. He is the namesake of the George Foreman Grill.

After a troubled childhood, Foreman took up amateur boxing and won a gold medal in the heavyweight division at the 1968 Summer Olympics. Having turned professional the next year, he won the undisputed world heavyweight title with a stunning second-round knockout of the then-undefeated Joe Frazier in 1973. He defended the belt twice before suffering his first professional loss to Muhammad Ali in "The Rumble in the Jungle" in 1974. Unable to secure another title opportunity, Foreman retired after a loss to Jimmy Young in 1977.

Following what he referred to as a born again experience, Foreman became an ordained Christian minister. Ten years later he announced a comeback, and in 1994, at age 45, won the unified WBA, IBF, and lineal heavyweight championship titles by knocking out 26-year-old Michael Moorer, earning Associated Press Athlete of the Year honors. He dropped the WBA belt rather than face his mandatory title defense soon after, and following a single successful title defense against Axel Schulz, Foreman relinquished his IBF title as well on June 28, 1995. At 46 years and 169 days old, he became the oldest world heavyweight champion in history, as well as the second-oldest boxer to win a world title in any weight class after Bernard Hopkins at light heavyweight. Foreman also holds the record for the longest interval between world title reigns, spanning more than 20 years. He retired in 1997 at the age of 48, with a final record of 76 wins (68 knockouts) and 5 losses.

Foreman is a member of both the World Boxing Hall of Fame and the International Boxing Hall of Fame. The International Boxing Research Organization rates Foreman as the eighth-greatest heavyweight of all time. In 2002, he was named one of the 25 greatest fighters of the past 80 years by The Ring; the following year, the magazine ranked him as the ninth-greatest puncher of all time. He was a ringside analyst for HBO's boxing coverage for 12 years until 2004. Outside boxing, Foreman was a successful entrepreneur and known for his promotion of the George Foreman Grill, which had sold more than 100 million units worldwide by 2011. In 1999, he sold the commercial rights to the grill for $138 million.

== Early life ==
George Edward Foreman was born in Marshall, Texas, on January 10, 1949, to Leroy Moorehead and Nancy Ree (Nelson). He grew up in the Fifth Ward community of Houston, Texas, with six siblings. He was raised by J.D. Foreman, whom his mother had married when George was a small child. By his own admission in his autobiography, George was a troubled youth. He dropped out of school at the age of 15 and spent time as a mugger. At age 16, Foreman had a change of heart and convinced his mother to sign him up for Job Corps after seeing an ad for the Corps on TV. As part of Job Corps, Foreman earned his GED and trained to become a carpenter and bricklayer. After moving to Pleasanton, California, with the help of a supervisor, he began to train. Foreman was interested in football and idolized Jim Brown, but gave it up for boxing.

== Amateur career ==
=== 1968 Summer Olympics ===
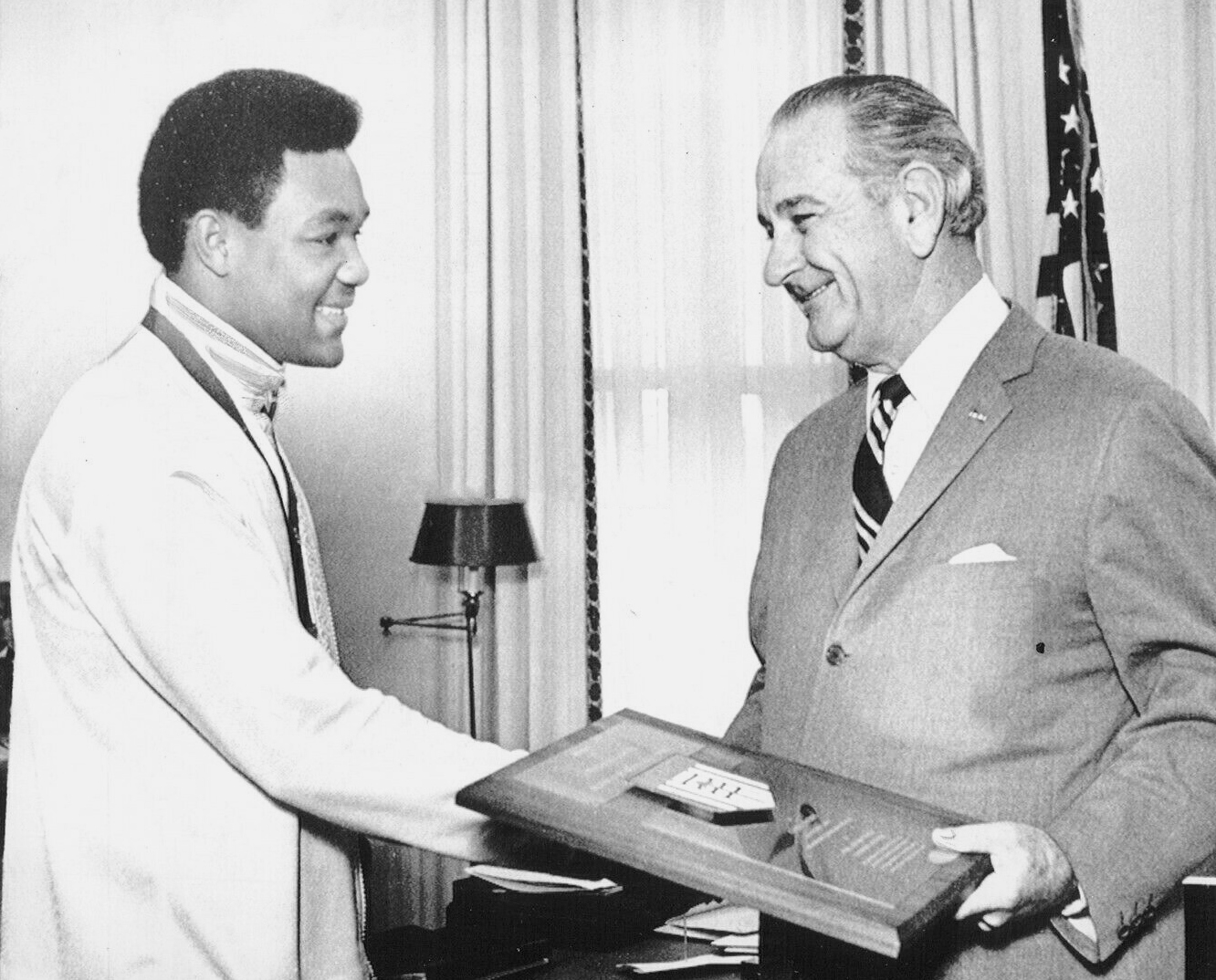
Foreman with President Lyndon B. Johnson in 1968

Foreman won a gold medal in the boxing/heavyweight division at the 1968 Mexico City Olympic Games. In the finals, Foreman defeated the Soviet Union's Jonas Čepulis; the referee stopped the fight in the second round. Čepulis' face was already bleeding in the first round from Foreman's punches, and had to take a standing eight count early in the second round. Čepulis, fighting out of Lithuania, was a 29-year-old veteran with a 12-year-long amateur career, having over 220 fights in his record, quite experienced, and 10 years older than Foreman.

- Round of 16: defeated Lucjan Trela (Poland) on points, 4–1
- Quarterfinal: defeated Ion Alexe (Romania) referee stopped contest, 3rd round
- Semi-final: defeated Giorgio Bambini (Italy) by a second-round knockout
- Final: defeated Jonas Čepulis (Soviet Union) referee stopped contest, second round

After winning the gold-medal fight, Foreman walked around the ring carrying a small U.S. flag and bowing to the crowd. Foreman maintained that earning the Olympic gold medal was the achievement he was most proud of in his boxing career, more so than either of his world titles.

=== Highlights ===
- He won his first amateur fight on January 26, 1967, by a first-round knockout in the Parks Diamond Belt Tournament.
- He won the San Francisco Examiner's Golden Gloves Tournament in the Junior Division in February 1967.
- In February 1967, he knocked out Thomas Cook to win the Las Vegas Golden Gloves in the Senior Division.
- In February 1968, he knocked out L.C. Brown to win the San Francisco Examiner's Senior Title in San Francisco.
- In March 1968, he won the National Boxing Championships heavyweight title in Toledo, Ohio, vs. Henry Crump of Philadelphia in the final.
- He sparred five rounds on two different occasions in July 1968 with former World Heavyweight Champion Sonny Liston (Liston sparred in 22-oz custom-made Everlast gloves, Foreman later recalled that Liston was "No doubt the scariest human being I've met in the ring, the only man to make me back up consistently".)
- On September 21, 1968, he won his second decision over Otis Evans to make the U.S. boxing team for the Mexico City Olympic Games.
- Foreman had a 16–4 amateur boxing record going into the Olympics. He won the Olympic Games Heavyweight Gold Medal after the referee stopped the fight against finalist Jonas Čepulis in the second round. He was trained for the Olympic Games by Robert (Pappy) Gault.
- His amateur record was 22–4 when he turned professional.

== Professional career ==
=== Early career ===
Foreman turned professional in 1969 with a three-round knockout of Donald Walheim in New York City. He had a total of 13 fights that year, winning all of them (11 by knockout).

In 1970, Foreman continued his march toward the undisputed heavyweight title, winning all 12 of his bouts (11 by knockout). Among the opponents he defeated were Gregorio Peralta, whom he decisioned at Madison Square Garden, although Peralta showed that Foreman was vulnerable to fast counter-punching mixed with an assertive boxing style. Foreman then defeated George Chuvalo by technical knockout (TKO) in three rounds. After this win, Foreman defeated Charlie Polite in four rounds and Boone Kirkman in three. Peralta and Chuvalo were Foreman's first world-level wins. Peralta was the number-10 ranked heavyweight in the world in January 1970 per The Ring, while Chuvalo was number seven in the world per their March 1971 issue.

In 1971, Foreman won seven more fights, winning all of them by knockout, including a rematch with Peralta, whom he defeated by knockout in the 10th and final round in Oakland, California, and a win over Leroy Caldwell, whom he knocked out in the second round. After amassing a record of 32–0 (29 KO), he was ranked as the number-one challenger by the World Boxing Association and World Boxing Council.

=== First reign as heavyweight champion ===
==== Foreman vs. Frazier ====
In 1972, still undefeated and with an impressive knockout record, Foreman was set to challenge undefeated and undisputed World Heavyweight Champion Joe Frazier. Despite boycotting a title elimination tournament resulting from the championship being stripped from Muhammad Ali, Frazier had won the title from Jimmy Ellis and defended his title four times since, including a 15-round unanimous decision over the previously unbeaten Ali in 1971 after Ali had beaten Oscar Bonavena and Jerry Quarry. Despite Foreman's superior size and reach, he was not expected to beat Frazier and was a 3:1 underdog going into the fight.

The Sunshine Showdown took place on January 22, 1973, in Kingston, Jamaica, with Foreman dominating the fight to win the championship by TKO. In ABC's rebroadcast, Howard Cosell made the memorable call, "Down goes Frazier! Down goes Frazier! Down goes Frazier!" Before the fight, Frazier was 29–0 (25 KO) and Foreman was 37–0 (34 KO). Frazier was knocked down six times by Foreman within two rounds (the three-knockdown rule was not in effect for this bout). After the second knockdown, Frazier's balance and mobility were impaired to the extent that he was unable to evade Foreman's combinations. Frazier managed to get to his feet for all six knockdowns, but referee Arthur Mercante eventually called an end to the one-sided bout.

==== Foreman vs. Roman ====
Foreman was sometimes characterized by the media as an aloof and antisocial champion. They said he sneered and was rarely available to the press. Foreman later said he was emulating former world champion and occasional sparring partner Sonny Liston. Foreman defended his title successfully twice during his initial reign as champion. His first defense, in Tokyo, pitted him against Puerto Rican Heavyweight Champion José Roman. Roman was not regarded as a top contender, but had managed to beat a few decent fighters such as EBU champion Spain Jose Manuel Urtain, and was ranked the number-seven heavyweight in the March 1973 issue of The Ring. Foreman won the fight in only two minutes.

==== Foreman vs. Norton ====
Foreman's next defense was against a much tougher opponent. In 1974, in Caracas, Venezuela, he faced the highly regarded future hall-of-famer Ken Norton (who was 30–2), a boxer noted for his heavy punch and crossed-armed defense (a style Foreman emulated in his comeback), who had broken the jaw of Muhammad Ali in a points victory a year earlier. Norton had performed well against Ali in their two matches, winning the first on points and narrowly losing the second. (Norton developed a reputation for showing nerves against heavy hitters, largely beginning with this fight.) After an even first round, Foreman staggered Norton with an uppercut a minute into round two, buckling him into the ropes. Norton did not hit the canvas, but continued on wobbly legs, clearly not having recovered, and shortly he went down a further two times in quick succession, with the referee intervening and stopping the fight.

There was considerable controversy after the fight as both fighters ran into unexpected trouble with the Venezuelan government. The fight had been made in Venezuela on the basis that all taxes would be waived. However, a day after the fight, the government renounced the offer. The tax problems led to the fight being dubbed the "Caracas Caper".

==== Foreman vs. Ali ====
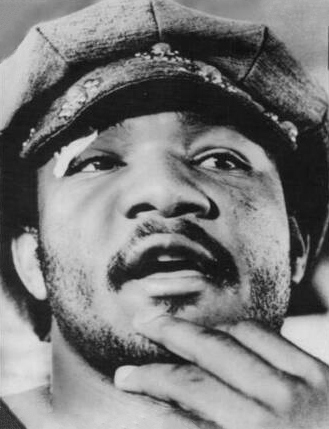
A cut to Foreman's right eye on September 18, 1974, postponed the bout for a month

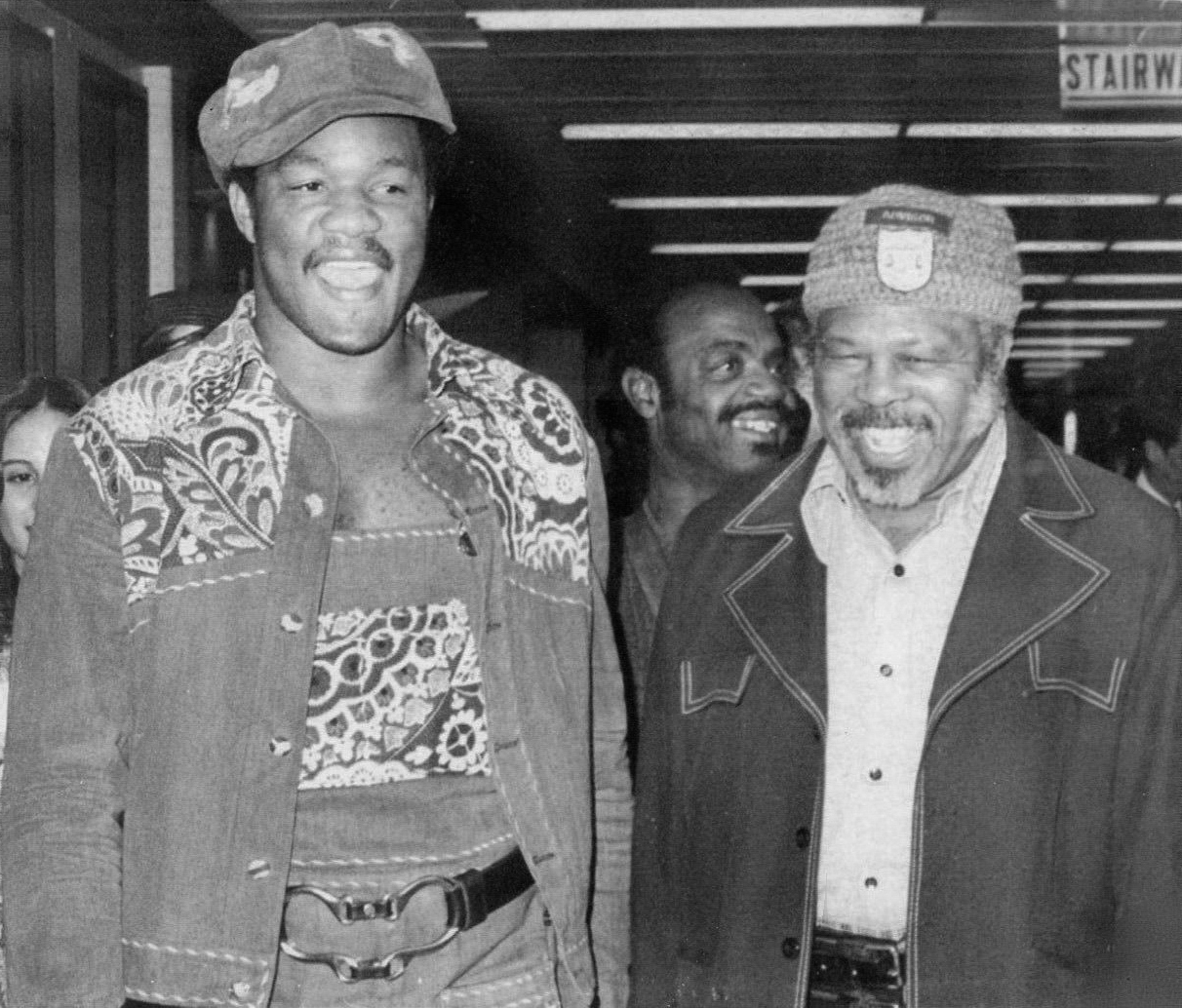
Foreman with trainer Archie Moore on September 10, 1974, on the way to Kinshasa for his fight with Muhammad Ali

Foreman's next title defense, on October 30, 1974, in Kinshasa, Zaire, against Muhammad Ali, was historic. The bout, promoted as "The Rumble in the Jungle", exceeded even its wildest expectations. During training there in mid-September Foreman suffered a cut above his eye, forcing postponement of the match for a month. The injury affected his training regimen, as it meant he could not spar in the build-up to the fight and risk the cut's being reopened. He later commented: "That was the best thing that happened to Ali when we were in Africa—the fact that I had to get ready for the fight without being able to box." Ali used this time to tour Zaire, endearing himself to the public, while taunting Foreman at every opportunity. Foreman was favored, having crushed undefeated heavyweight champion Joe Frazier and toppled formidable challenger Ken Norton both within two rounds.

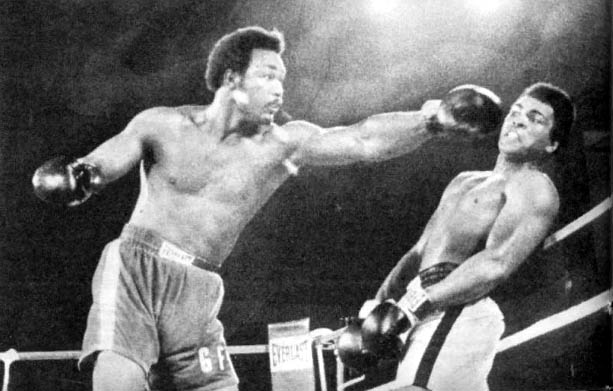
Ali doing the "rope-a-dope" to avoid Foreman's formidable power

When Foreman and Ali finally met in the ring, Ali began more aggressively than expected, outscoring Foreman with superior punching speed. In the second round, Ali retreated to the ropes, shielding his head and hitting Foreman in the face at every opportunity. Foreman dug vicious body punches into Ali's sides; however, Foreman was unable to land many big punches to Ali's head. The ring ropes were unusually loose, and Foreman later charged that Angelo Dundee (Ali's longtime trainer) had loosened them as part of Ali's tactic to lean back and away from the wild swings before clinching Foreman behind the head; Dundee stated that not only did he tighten the ropes because they were so loose due to the heat, Ali came up with the "rope-a-dope" strategy entirely on his own. Ali had been known as a fighter of speed and movement, but the rope-a-dope technique worked exactly to plan, since Foreman had not had a fight that lasted past the fourth round since 1971.

Ali continued to take heavy punishment to the body in exchange for the opportunity to land a hard jolt to Foreman's head. Ali later said he was "out on his feet" twice during the bout. As Foreman began to tire, his punches began to lose power and became increasingly wild. By mid-bout an increasingly confident Ali began to taunt the exhausted champion relentlessly, who had been reduced to mere pawing and landing harmless rubber-armed blows. Late in the eighth round Ali came off the ropes with a series of successively harder and more accurate right hooks to the side and back of Foreman's head, leaving him dazed and careening backwards. After a lightning two-punch flurry squared him up, Ali ended the bout with a combination of solid left hook and straight right flush to the jaw that sent Foreman windmilling hard to the canvas, the first time he had been down in his career. At the stoppage, Ali led on all three scorecards by 68–66, 70–67, and 69–66.

Foreman later reflected, "it just wasn't my night". Foreman later also claimed he was drugged by his trainer prior to the bout. Though he sought a rematch with Ali, he was unable to secure one. In some quarters it was suggested Ali was ducking him, while taking on low-risk opponents such as Chuck Wepner, Richard Dunn, Jean Pierre Coopman, and Alfredo Evangelista. However, Ali also fought formidable opponents, such as Ron Lyle, and accepted rematches with Frazier and Ken Norton, the only two men to have beaten him up until that time.

=== Return to the ring ===
==== Foreman vs. Lyle ====
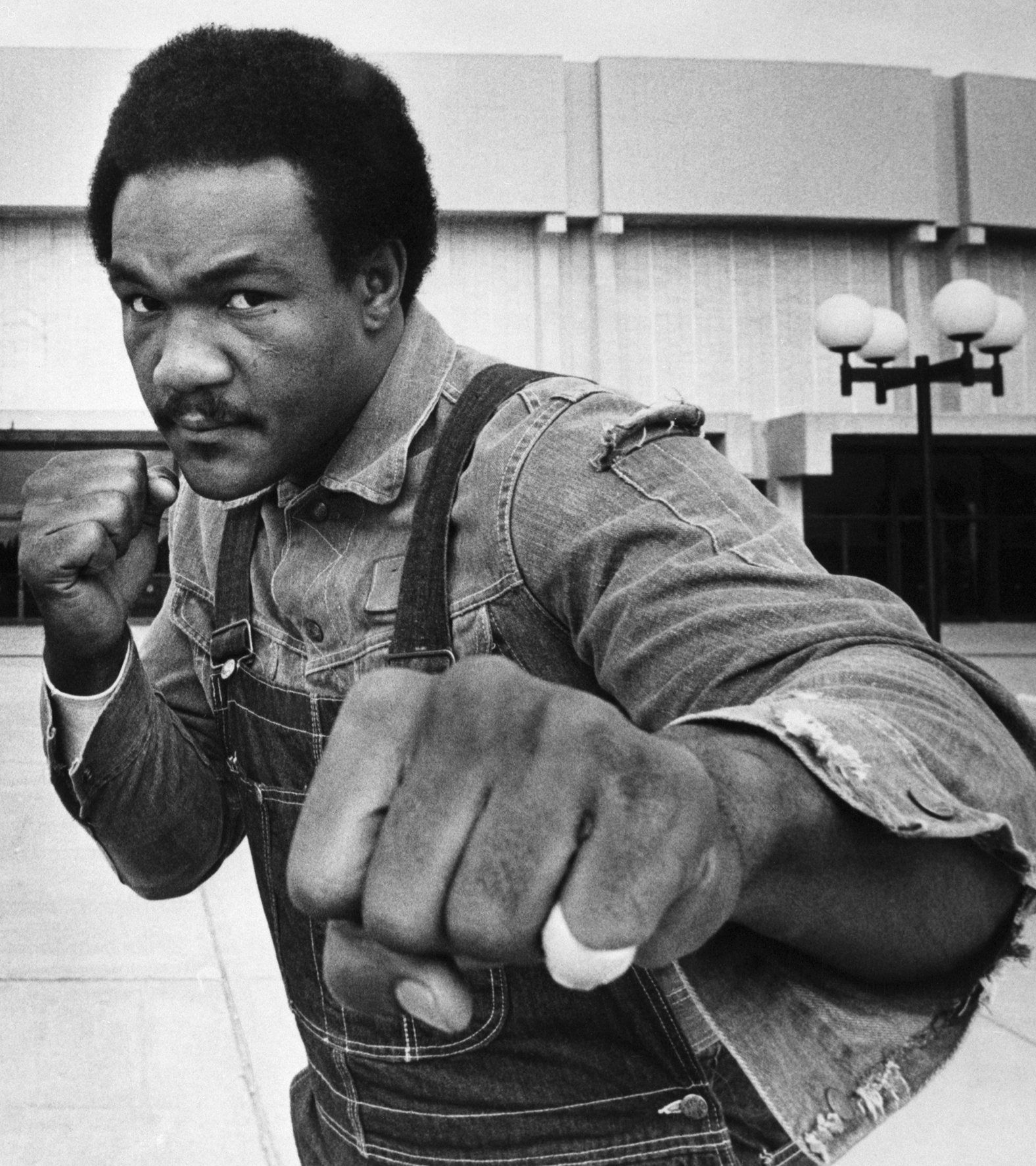
Foreman posing in 1976

In 1976, he announced a professional comeback and stated his intention of securing a rematch with Ali. His first opponent was to be Ron Lyle, who had been defeated by Ali in 1975, via an 11th-round TKO. Lyle was the number-five rated heavyweight in the world at the time per the March 1976 issue of The Ring. At the end of the first round, Lyle landed a hard right that sent Foreman staggering across the ring. In the second round, Foreman pounded Lyle against the ropes and might have scored a KO, but the bell rang with a minute still remaining in the round and Lyle survived. In the third, Foreman pressed forward, with Lyle waiting to counter off the ropes. In the fourth, a brutal slugfest erupted. A cluster of power punches from Lyle sent Foreman to the canvas. When Foreman got up, Lyle staggered him again, but just as Foreman seemed finished, he retaliated with a hard right to the side of the head, knocking down Lyle. Lyle beat the count, then landed another brutal combination, knocking Foreman down for the second time. Again, Foreman beat the count. Foreman said later that he had never been hit so hard in a fight and remembered looking down at the canvas and seeing blood. In the fifth round, both fighters continued to ignore defense and traded their hardest punches, looking crude. Each man staggered the other, and each seemed almost out on his feet. Then, as if finally tired, Lyle stopped punching, and Foreman delivered a dozen unanswered blows until Lyle collapsed to the canvas. Lyle remained down, giving Foreman a KO victory. The fight was named by The Ring as "The Fight of the Year".

==== Foreman vs. Frazier II ====
For his next bout, Foreman chose to face Joe Frazier in a rematch. Frazier was then the world's number-three heavyweight per The Ring. Because of the one-sided Foreman victory in their first fight, and the fact that Frazier had taken a tremendous amount of punishment from Ali in Manila a year earlier, few expected him to win. Frazier at this point was 32–3, having lost only to Foreman and Ali twice, and Foreman was 41–1, with his sole defeat at the hands of Ali. However, their rematch began competitively, as Frazier used quick head movements to make Foreman miss with his hardest punches. Frazier was wearing a contact lens for his vision, which was knocked loose during the bout. Unable to mount a significant offense, Frazier was eventually floored twice by Foreman in the fifth round and the fight was stopped. Next, Foreman knocked out Scott LeDoux in three rounds and prospect John Dino Denis in four to finish the year.

==== Foreman vs. Young ====
Foreman had a life-changing year in 1977. After knocking out Pedro Agosto in four rounds at Pensacola, Florida, Foreman flew to Puerto Rico a day before his next fight without giving himself time to acclimatize. His opponent was the skilled boxer Jimmy Young, who had beaten Ron Lyle and lost a very controversial decision to Muhammad Ali the previous year. Foreman fought cautiously early on, allowing Young to settle into the fight. Young constantly complained about Foreman pushing him, for which Foreman eventually had a point deducted by the referee, although Young was never warned for his persistent holding. Foreman badly hurt Young in round seven, but was unable to land a finishing blow. Foreman tired during the second half of the fight and suffered a knockdown in round twelve before losing by unanimous decision. Referee Waldemar Schmidt had it 118–111, judge Cesar Ramos scored it 116–112, and judge Ismael Wiso Fernandez scored it 115–114, all to Young.

=== Retirement ===
Foreman became ill in his dressing room after his bout versus Young. He was suffering from exhaustion and heat stroke and stated he had a near-death experience. He spoke of being in a hellish, frightening place of nothingness and despair, and felt that he was in the midst of death. Though not yet religious, he began to plead with God to help him. He explained that he sensed God asking him to change his life and ways whereupon he said, "I don't care if this is death—I still believe there is a God!"

After this experience, Foreman became a born-again Christian, dedicating his life for the next decade to God. Although he did not formally retire from boxing, Foreman stopped fighting and became an ordained minister, initially preaching on street corners before becoming the minister of the Church of the Lord Jesus Christ in Houston and devoting himself to his family and his congregation. He also opened a youth center that bears his name. Foreman continued to speak about his experience on Christian television broadcasts such as The 700 Club and the Trinity Broadcasting Network.

=== Comeback ===
In 1987, after 10 years away from the ring, Foreman surprised the boxing world by announcing a comeback at the age of 38. In his autobiography, he wrote that his primary motive was to raise money to fund the youth center he had created, which had required much of the money he had earned in the initial phase of his career. Another stated ambition was to fight Mike Tyson. For his first fight, he went to Sacramento, California, where he beat journeyman Steve Zouski by a knockout in four rounds. Foreman weighed 267 lb (121 kg) for the fight and looked badly out of shape. Although many thought his decision to return to the ring was a mistake, Foreman countered that he had returned to prove that age was not a barrier to people achieving their goals (as he said later, he wanted to show that age 40 is not a "death sentence"). He won four more bouts that year, gradually slimming down and improving his fitness. In 1988, he won nine times, including a seventh-round knockout of former Light Heavyweight and Cruiserweight Champion Dwight Muhammad Qawi when referee Carlos Padilla Jr. stopped the fight.

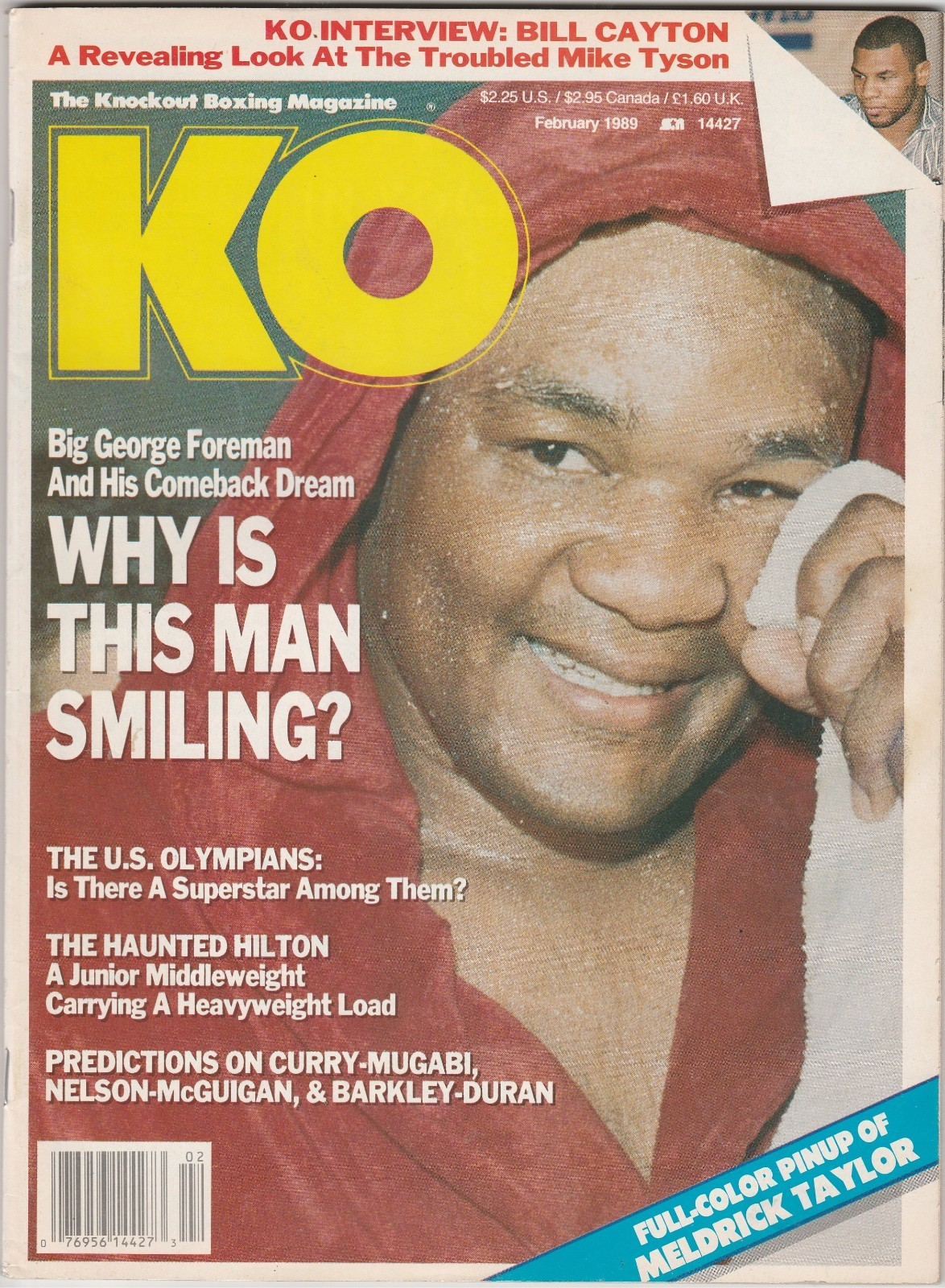
Foreman on the cover of the February 1989 issue of KO Magazine during his comeback

Having always been a deliberate fighter, Foreman had not lost much mobility in the ring since his first retirement, although he found keeping his balance harder after throwing big punches and could no longer throw rapid combinations. He was still capable of landing heavy single blows, however. The late-round fatigue that had plagued him in the ring as a young man had improved and he could comfortably compete for 12 rounds. Foreman attributed this to his new, relaxed fighting style.

By 1989, while continuing his comeback, Foreman sold his name and face for the advertising of various products, most notably the successful George Foreman Grill. His public persona improved considerably, and the formerly aloof, intimidating Foreman was replaced by a cheerful, friendly man who engaged in self-deprecation on The Tonight Show. He also befriended Ali and as the latter had done, made himself a celebrity outside of boxing. Foreman continued his string of victories, winning five more fights, the most impressive being a three-round win over Bert Cooper, who went on to contest the undisputed heavyweight title against Evander Holyfield.

==== Foreman vs. Cooney ====
In 1990, Foreman met former title challenger Gerry Cooney in Atlantic City, New Jersey. Cooney was coming off a long period of inactivity, but was well regarded for his punching power. Cooney wobbled Foreman in the first round, but Foreman landed several powerful punches in the second round. Cooney was knocked down twice and Foreman finished with a KO. Foreman went on to win four more fights that year.

=== World title challenges ===
==== Foreman vs. Holyfield ====
The following year, Foreman was given the opportunity to challenge undisputed heavyweight champion Evander Holyfield for the world title in a pay-per-view boxing event. Very few boxing experts gave the 42-year-old Foreman a chance of winning. Foreman, who weighed in at 257 pounds, began the contest by marching forward, absorbing several of Holyfield's best combinations and occasionally landing a powerful swing of his own. Holyfield proved too tough and agile to knock down and was well ahead on points throughout the fight, but Foreman surprised many by lasting the full 12 rounds, losing his challenge on points, with scores of 116–111, 115–112, and 117–110. Although The Ring magazine's "Round of the Year" was not awarded in 1991, the seventh round, in which Foreman knocked Holyfield off balance before being staggered by a powerful combination, has been called a historic round of boxing and the remarkable high point of the fight.

==== Foreman vs. Stewart ====
A year later, Foreman fought journeyman Alex Stewart, who had previously been stopped in the first round by Mike Tyson. Foreman knocked down Stewart twice in the second round, but expended a lot of energy in doing so. He was subsequently tired, and Stewart rebounded. By the end of the 10th and final round, Foreman's face was bloodied and swollen, but the judges awarded him a majority decision win, with scores of 94–94 and 94–93 twice.

==== Foreman vs. Coetzer ====
Foreman returned to the ring in January 1993, defeating South African heavyweight contender Pierre Coetzer by eighth-round technical knockout.

==== Foreman vs. Morrison ====
Foreman received another title shot, although this was for the vacant WBO title. Foreman's opponent was Tommy Morrison, a young prospect known for his punching power. Morrison retreated throughout the fight, refusing to trade toe-to-toe, and sometimes turned his back on Foreman. The strategy paid off and he outboxed Foreman from long range. After 12 rounds, Morrison won a unanimous decision, with two scores of 117–110 and one score of 118–109.

In this period, Foreman also starred briefly in the situation comedy George on ABC. The show, which featured Foreman as a retired boxer, premiered in November 1993, and ran for nine episodes, though ten were made. The show was co-produced by actor and former boxer Tony Danza.

=== Second reign as heavyweight champion ===
==== Foreman vs. Moorer ====
In 1994, Foreman again sought to challenge for the world championship after Michael Moorer had beaten Holyfield for the IBF and WBA titles. Having lost his last fight against Morrison, Foreman was unranked and in no position to demand another title shot. His relatively high profile, however, made a title shot against Moorer, 19 years his junior, a lucrative prospect at seemingly little risk for the champion.

Foreman's title challenge against Moorer took place on November 5 in Las Vegas, Nevada, with Foreman wearing the same red trunks he had worn in his title loss to Ali 20 years earlier. This time, however, Foreman was a substantial underdog. For nine rounds, Moorer easily outboxed him, hitting and moving away, while Foreman chugged forward, seemingly unable to "pull the trigger" on his punches. Entering the 10th round, Foreman was trailing on all scorecards: two judges had it 88–83 and one had it 86–85, all to Moorer. However, Foreman launched a comeback in the 10th round and hit Moorer with a number of punches. Then, a short right hand caught Moorer on the tip of his chin, gashing open his bottom lip, and he collapsed to the canvas. He lay flat on the canvas as the referee counted him out.

In an instant, Foreman had regained the title he had lost to Muhammad Ali two decades before. He went back to his corner and knelt in prayer as the arena erupted in cheers. With this historic victory, Foreman broke three records: He became, at age 45, the oldest fighter ever to win a world championship; 20 years after losing his title for the first time, he broke the record for the fighter with the longest interval between his first and second world championships; and he also became the oldest winner of a major title fight.

==== Foreman vs. Schulz ====
Shortly after the 1994 Moorer fight, Foreman began talking about a potential superfight with Mike Tyson, then the youngest heavyweight champion on record. In 1995, The New York Times quoted Foreman as stating, "If he doesn't sign with Don King, we'll fight before the end of the year ... I can't be bothered having trouble with Don King. Every contract has some complication." Tyson signed with King (and by 1998, was suing him for $100 million); and the bout never materialized.

The WBA demanded that Foreman fight their number-one challenger, who at the time was the competent, but aging, Tony Tucker. For reasons not clearly known, Foreman refused to fight Tucker and allowed the WBA to strip him of that belt.

On April 22, 1995, Foreman fought midlevel underdog prospect Axel Schulz, of Germany, in defense of his remaining IBF title. Schulz jabbed strongly from long range, and exhibited increasing confidence as the fight progressed. Foreman finished the fight with a swelling over one eye, but was awarded a controversial majority decision, with one judge ruled the fight a draw with a score of 114–114, while the other two had the fight 115–113 in favor of Foreman. The IBF ordered an immediate rematch to be held in Germany; Foreman refused the terms and was stripped of his remaining title, yet continued to be recognized as the Lineal Heavyweight Champion.

=== Post-title career ===
==== Foreman vs. Briggs ====
In 1996, Foreman returned to Tokyo, scoring an easy win over the unrated Crawford Grimsley by a 12-round decision, with scores of 116–112, 117–111, and 119–109. In 1997, he faced contender Lou Savarese, winning a close split decision (113–114, 115–112, and 118–110) in a grueling, competitive encounter. Then, yet another opportunity came Foreman's way as the WBC decided to match him against Shannon Briggs in a 1997 "eliminator bout" for the right to face WBC champion Lennox Lewis. After 12 rounds, in which Foreman consistently rocked Briggs with power punches, almost everyone at ringside saw Foreman as the clear winner. Like Foreman's fight with Schulz, the decision was highly controversial, but this time the decision went in favor of Foreman's opponent, with Briggs awarded a majority decision. One judge scored the bout 114–114, while the other two judges scored it 117–113 and 116–112 for Briggs. Foreman had fought for the last time, at the age of 48.

=== Second retirement ===
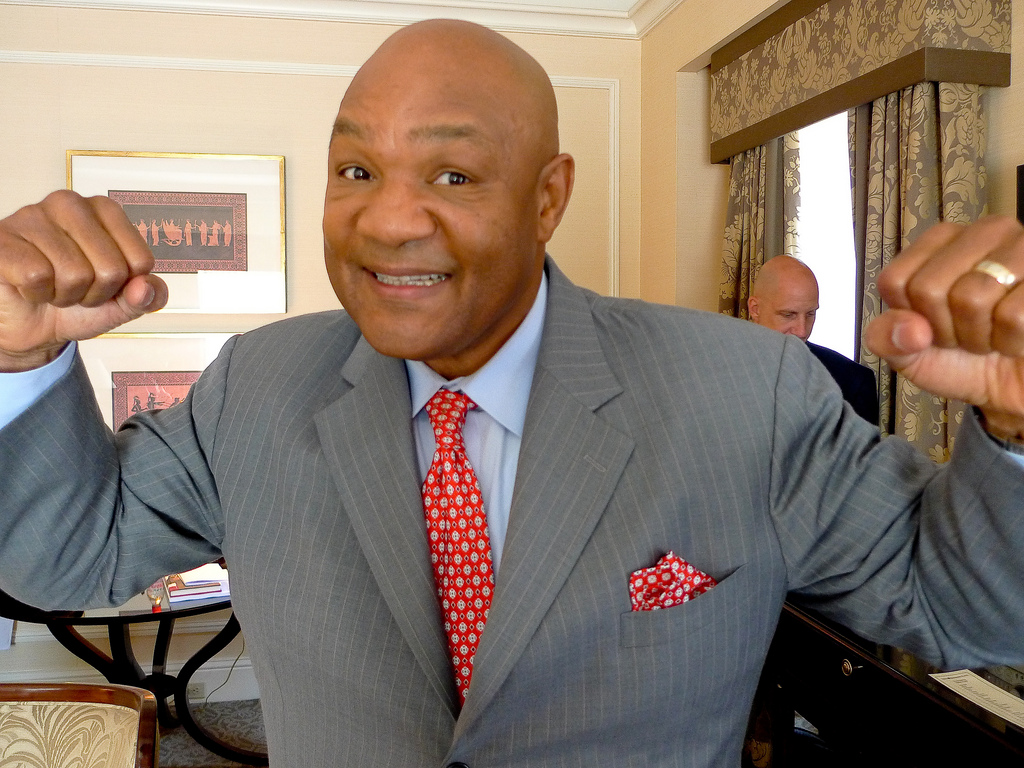
Foreman in 2009

Though it was not aired, a travelogue series of the Walt Disney Parks and Resorts called The Walt Disney Magic Hour, and hosted by Foreman, was supposed to debut as part of PAX's debut lineup in 1998.

Foreman was gracious and philosophical in his loss to Briggs, but announced his "final" retirement shortly afterwards. However, he did plan a return bout against Larry Holmes in 1999, scheduled to take place at the Houston Astrodome on pay-per-view. The fight was to be billed as "The Birthday Bash" due to both fighters' upcoming birthdays. Foreman was set to make $10 million and Holmes was to make $4 million, but negotiations fell through and the fight was canceled. With a continuing affinity for the sport, Foreman became a respected boxing analyst for HBO.

Foreman said he had no plans to resume his career as a boxer, but then announced in February 2004 that he was training for one more comeback fight to demonstrate that the age of 55, like 40, is not a "death sentence". The bout, against an unspecified opponent (rumored to be Trevor Berbick), never materialized. In a later interview, Foreman credited his wife's influence on his change of plans. He left the sport of boxing after leaving HBO to pursue other opportunities.

== Exhibition bouts ==
=== Foreman vs. Five ===
Foreman announced an exhibition match in 1975, billed as Foreman vs Five, where he would fight five contenders in one night. Following his first loss to Muhammad Ali and a subsequent year-long hiatus, the event was meant to re-spark interest in Foreman and showcase his strength and ability to knock out opponents. The first criticisms came as the opponents Foreman was fighting were revealed to be journeymen with sub-par or inexperienced records. This energy transferred over to the night of the event as Foreman was met with boos from the crowd as well as antagonistic chants of "Ali! Ali! Ali" as he made his appearance and walked out to the ring. While in the ring, Foreman began to verbally spar with Ali, who was commentating ring-side with Howard Cosell. After knocking-out opponents, Foreman would walk over to his corner and begin to taunt Ali, to which Ali responded by yelling advice to Foreman's opponents mid-fight. Foreman was met with jeers all throughout the night as the crowd grew increasingly displeased at Foreman's defeats of his first three opponents, all by knockout. After the initial victories, Foreman, now completely enraged and exhausted, was unable to beat his last two opponents, who were met with cheers and applause for lasting against the former champion. The event was initially meant to bolster support for Foreman's comeback, though the public was now even more unsure of his abilities.

== Ministerial career ==
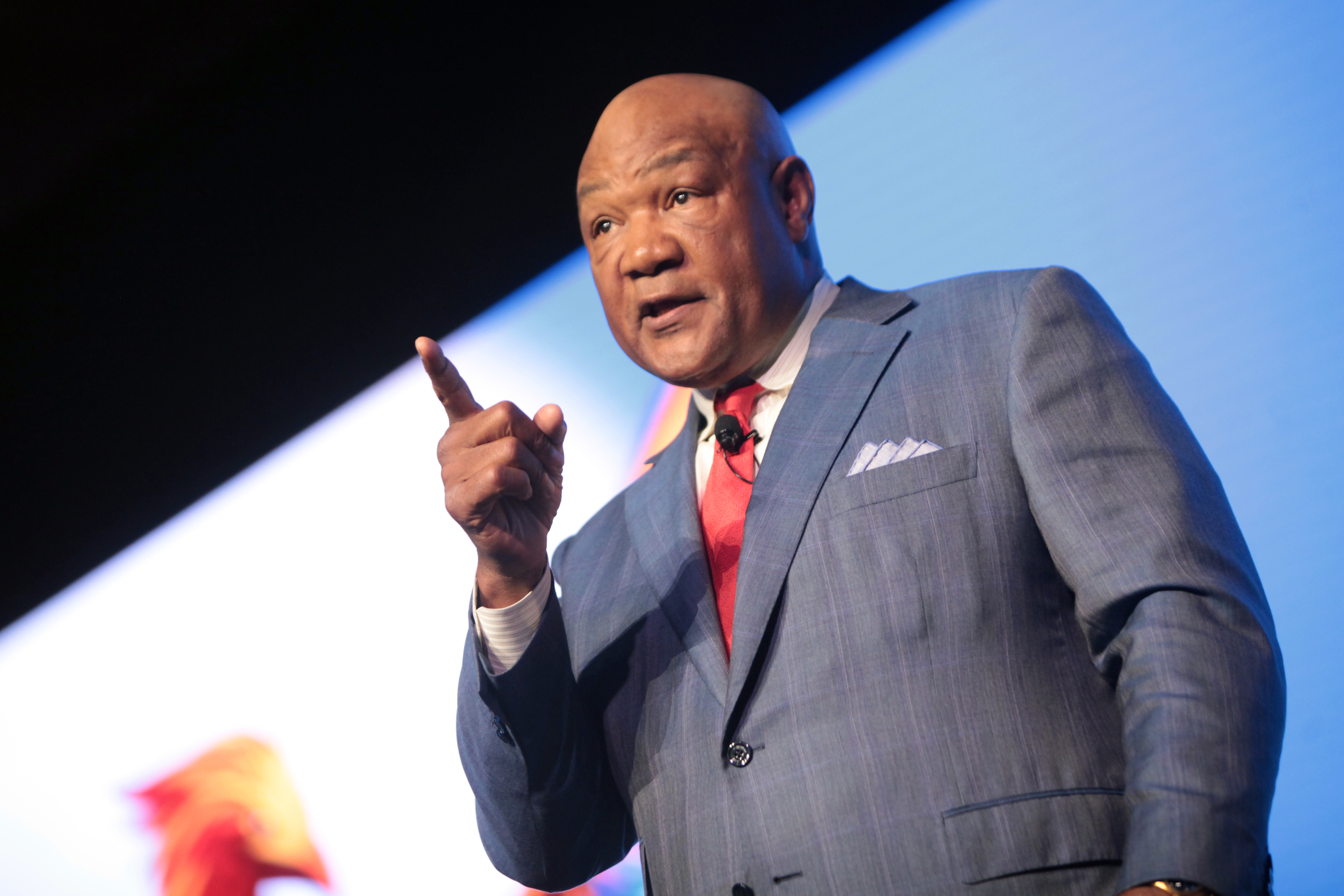
Foreman in 2016

In his youth, Foreman grew up largely without religion in his life. His spiritual change and ministry have been well documented. After a boxing match with heavyweight Jimmy Young, Foreman was in the locker room and suddenly felt that he was dying. Wanting to survive, he prayerfully offered "to devote his boxing prize money to charity" when he heard a voice saying "I don't want your money...I want you." The New York Times reported:

Then a "giant hand" plucked him into consciousness. Foreman found himself on a locker room table, surrounded by friends and staff members. He felt as if he were physically filled with the presence of a dying Christ. He felt his forehead bleed, punctured by a crown of thorns; his wrists, he believed, had been pierced by nails of the cross. "I knew that Jesus Christ was coming alive in me," Foreman said. "I ran into the shower and turned on the water and—hallelujah!—I was born again. I kissed everybody in the dressing room and told them I loved them. That happened in March 1977, and I never have been the same again."

Foreman stated that in this crisis experience, he became a born-again Christian. Following this, HBO boxing commentator Larry Merchant commented that "There was a transformation from a young, hard character who felt a heavyweight champion should carry himself with menace to a very affectionate personality." Foreman was welcomed by members of The Church of the Lord Jesus Christ, a Holiness Pentecostal church on Lone Oak Road in Houston, where he eventually became the pastor in 1980. Under his leadership, the Church of the Lord Jesus Christ opened the George Foreman Youth and Community Center to minister to children and adolescents in the area. Foreman declared that "I'm always studying the Bible" and stated that "The more you learn, the more you realize how much you don't know." Foreman led three church services a week, in which he aimed "to reveal something about the Bible that they [his congregation] didn't know". Foreman opined that "It doesn't matter what you achieve, what you accomplish in this life...The most important thing is to keep your eye on the true prize, and that's serving God."

== Other works ==
In 2022, Foreman competed in season eight of The Masked Singer as "Venus Fly Trap". He was eliminated on "Hall of Fame Night" alongside George Clinton as "Gopher".

Foreman also served as an executive producer on Big George Foreman, a 2023 Christian film based on his sporting and spiritual life.

== Personal life ==
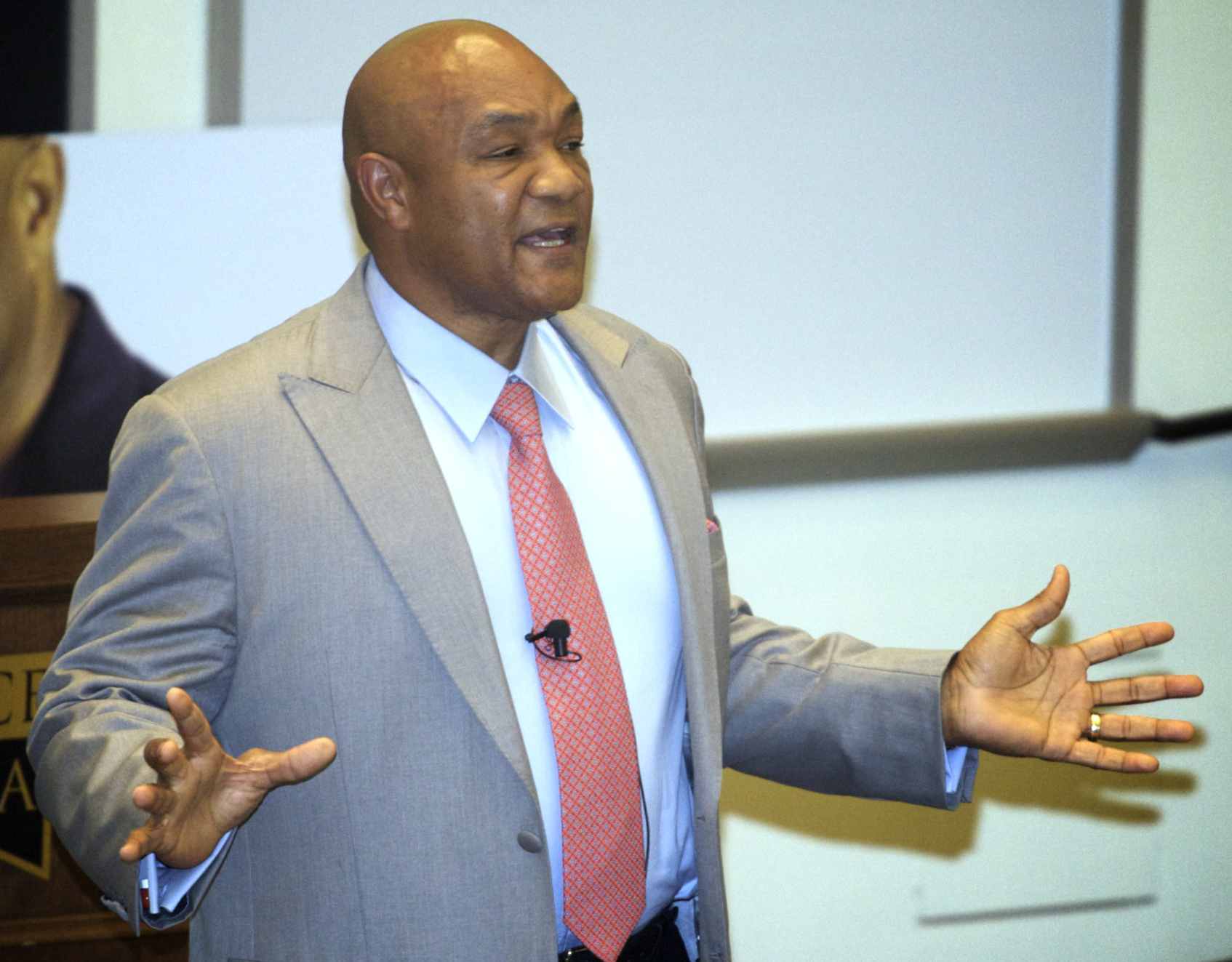
Foreman speaking in Houston in September 2009

Foreman was married to Mary Joan Martelly from 1985 until his death. He had four previous marriages: to Adrienne Calhoun from 1971 to 1974, Cynthia Lewis from 1977 to 1979, Sharon Goodson from 1981 to 1982, and Andrea Skeete from 1982 to 1985.

Foreman had 12 children: five sons and seven daughters. His five sons are George Jr., George III ("Monk"), George IV ("Big Wheel"), George V ("Red"), and George VI ("Little Joey"). On his Web site, Foreman explained, "I named all my sons George Edward Foreman so they would always have something in common. I say to them, 'If one of us goes up, then we all go up together, and if one goes down, we all go down together!'" Like his father, George III has pursued a career in boxing and entrepreneurship. George IV ran for the U.S. House of Representatives in Texas' 18th Congressional District in 2026, and appeared on the second season of the reality television series American Grit, where he placed seventh.

His seven daughters are Natalie, Leola, Freeda, Michi, Georgetta, Isabella, and Courtney. Natalie and Leola are from his marriage to Mary Joan Martelly. His daughters from separate relationships are Freeda, Michi, and Georgetta. He adopted two daughters, Isabella Brandie Lilja (Foreman), in 2009, and Courtney Isaac (Foreman), in 2012. Freeda had a 5–1 record as a pro boxer, retired in 2001, and died in 2019 at age 42 in an apparent suicide. Isabella Foreman lives in Sweden, where she has blogged since 2010 under the name of BellaNeutella.

In recognition of Foreman's patriotism and community service, the American Legion honored him with its James V. Day "Good Guy" Award during its 95th National Convention in 2013.

== Death ==
Foreman died in a hospital in Houston on March 21, 2025, at age 76. His memorial service was held on April 14 at the Wortham Theater Center.

In 2026, it was announced that Foreman had been privately buried at Logan Park Cemetery in Sioux City, Iowa, after his memorial service. Foreman had visited the area in the 1980s and fell in love with the landscape, particularly the Loess Hills.

== George Foreman Grill ==
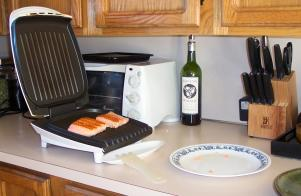
A George Foreman grill

When Foreman came back from retirement, he argued that his success was due to his healthy eating. He was approached by Salton, Inc., which was looking for a spokesperson for its fat-reducing grill. As of 2009, the George Foreman Grill has sold over 100 million units.

Although Foreman never confirmed exactly how much he earned from the endorsement, Salton paid him $138 million in 1999 for the right to use his name. Prior to that, he was paid about 40% of the profits on each grill sold (earning him $4.5 million a month in payouts at its peak), yielding an estimated total of over $200 million just from the endorsement through 2011, substantially more than he earned as a boxer.

== Professional boxing record ==
81 fights	76 wins	5 losses
By knockout	68	1
By decision	8	4

No.	Result	Record	Opponent	Type	Round, time	Date	Age	Location	Notes
81	Loss	76–5	Shannon Briggs	MD	12	Nov 22, 1997	48 years, 316 days	Etess Arena, Atlantic City, New Jersey, U.S.	Lost Lineal heavyweight title
80	Win	76–4	Lou Savarese	SD	12	Apr 26, 1997	48 years, 106 days	Convention Hall, Atlantic City, New Jersey, U.S.	Retained WBU and Lineal heavyweight titles
79	Win	75–4	Crawford Grimsley	UD	12	Nov 3, 1996	47 years, 298 days	NK Hall, Urayasu, Japan	Retained WBU, and Lineal heavyweight titles; Won vacant IBA heavyweight title
78	Win	74–4	Axel Schulz	MD	12	Apr 22, 1995	46 years, 102 days	MGM Grand Garden Arena, Paradise, Nevada, U.S.	Retained IBF and Lineal heavyweight titles; Won vacant WBU heavyweight title
77	Win	73–4	Michael Moorer	KO	10 (12), 2:03	Nov 5, 1994	45 years, 299 days	MGM Grand Garden Arena, Paradise, Nevada, U.S.	Won WBA, IBF, and Lineal heavyweight titles
76	Loss	72–4	Tommy Morrison	UD	12	Jun 7, 1993	44 years, 148 days	Thomas & Mack Center, Paradise, Nevada, U.S.	For vacant WBO heavyweight title
75	Win	72–3	Pierre Coetzer	TKO	8 (10), 1:48	Jan 16, 1993	44 years, 6 days	Convention Center, Reno, Nevada, U.S.	
74	Win	71–3	Alex Stewart	MD	10	Apr 11, 1992	43 years, 92 days	Thomas & Mack Center, Paradise, Nevada, U.S.	
73	Win	70–3	Jimmy K. Ellis	TKO	3 (10), 1:36	Dec 7, 1991	42 years, 331 days	Convention Center, Reno, Nevada, U.S.	
72	Loss	69–3	Evander Holyfield	UD	12	Apr 19, 1991	42 years, 99 days	Convention Hall, Atlantic City, New Jersey, U.S.	For WBA, WBC, Lineal, and IBF heavyweight titles
71	Win	69–2	Terry Anderson	KO	1 (10), 2:59	Sep 25, 1990	41 years, 258 days	London Arena, London, England	
70	Win	68–2	Ken Lakusta	KO	3 (10), 1:24	Jul 31, 1990	41 years, 202 days	Northlands AgriCom, Edmonton, Alberta, Canada	
69	Win	67–2	Adilson Rodrigues	KO	2 (10), 2:39	Jun 16, 1990	41 years, 157 days	Caesars Palace, Paradise, Nevada, U.S.	
68	Win	66–2	Mike Jameson	TKO	4 (10), 2:16	Apr 17, 1990	41 years, 97 days	Caesars Tahoe, Stateline, Nevada, U.S.	
67	Win	65–2	Gerry Cooney	KO	2 (10), 1:57	Jan 15, 1990	41 years, 5 days	Convention Hall, Atlantic City, New Jersey, U.S.	
66	Win	64–2	Everett Martin	UD	10	Jul 20, 1989	40 years, 191 days	Convention Center, Tucson, Arizona, U.S.	
65	Win	63–2	Bert Cooper	RTD	2 (10), 3:00	Jun 1, 1989	40 years, 142 days	Pride Pavilion, Phoenix, Arizona, U.S.	
64	Win	62–2	J. B. Williamson	TKO	5 (10), 1:37	Apr 30, 1989	40 years, 110 days	Moody Gardens Hotel Spa, Galveston, Texas, U.S.	
63	Win	61–2	Manoel De Almeida	TKO	3 (10), 2:14	Feb 16, 1989	40 years, 37 days	Atlantis Theater, Orlando, Florida, U.S.	
62	Win	60–2	Mark Young	TKO	7 (10), 1:47	Jan 26, 1989	40 years, 16 days	Community War Memorial, Rochester, New York, U.S.	
61	Win	59–2	David Jaco	TKO	1 (10), 2:03	Dec 28, 1988	39 years, 353 days	Casa Royal Banquet Hall, Bakersfield, California, U.S.	
60	Win	58–2	Tony Fulilangi	TKO	2 (10), 2:26	Oct 27, 1988	39 years, 291 days	Civic Center, Marshall, Texas, U.S.	
59	Win	57–2	Bobby Hitz	TKO	1 (10), 2:59	Sep 10, 1988	39 years, 244 days	The Palace, Auburn Hills, Michigan, U.S.	
58	Win	56–2	Ladislao Mijangos	TKO	2 (10), 2:42	Aug 25, 1988	39 years, 228 days	Lee County Civic Center, Fort Myers, Florida, U.S.	
57	Win	55–2	Carlos Hernández	TKO	4 (10), 1:36	Jun 26, 1988	39 years, 168 days	Tropworld Casino and Entertainment Resort, Atlantic City, New Jersey, U.S.	
56	Win	54–2	Frank Lux	TKO	3 (10), 2:07	May 21, 1988	39 years, 132 days	Sullivan Arena, Anchorage, Alaska, U.S.	
55	Win	53–2	Dwight Muhammad Qawi	TKO	7 (10), 1:51	Mar 19, 1988	39 years, 69 days	Caesars Palace, Paradise, Nevada, U.S.	
54	Win	52–2	Guido Trane	TKO	5 (10), 2:39	Feb 5, 1988	39 years, 26 days	Caesars Palace, Paradise, Nevada, U.S.	
53	Win	51–2	Tom Trimm	KO	1 (10), 0:45	Jan 23, 1988	39 years, 13 days	Sheraton Twin Towers, Orlando, Florida, U.S.	
52	Win	50–2	Rocky Sekorski	TKO	3 (10), 2:48	Dec 18, 1987	38 years, 342 days	Bally's Las Vegas, Paradise, Nevada, U.S.	
51	Win	49–2	Tim Anderson	TKO	4 (10), 2:23	Nov 21, 1987	38 years, 315 days	Eddie Graham Sports Complex, Orlando, Florida, U.S.	
50	Win	48–2	Bobby Crabtree	TKO	6 (10)	Sep 15, 1987	38 years, 248 days	The Hitchin' Post, Springfield, Missouri, U.S.	
49	Win	47–2	Charles Hostetter	KO	3 (10), 2:01	Jul 9, 1987	38 years, 180 days	County Coliseum, Oakland, California, U.S.	
48	Win	46–2	Steve Zouski	TKO	4 (10), 2:47	Mar 9, 1987	38 years, 58 days	ARCO Arena, Sacramento, California, U.S.	
47	Loss	45–2	Jimmy Young	UD	12	Mar 17, 1977	28 years, 66 days	Roberto Clemente Coliseum, San Juan, Puerto Rico	
46	Win	45–1	Pedro Agosto	TKO	4 (10), 2:34	Jan 22, 1977	28 years, 12 days	Civic Center, Pensacola, Florida, U.S.	
45	Win	44–1	John "Dino" Denis	TKO	4 (10), 2:25	Oct 15, 1976	27 years, 279 days	Sportatorium, Hollywood, Florida, U.S.	
44	Win	43–1	Scott LeDoux	TKO	3 (10), 2:58	Aug 14, 1976	27 years, 217 days	Memorial Auditorium, Utica, New York, U.S.	
43	Win	42–1	Joe Frazier	TKO	5 (12), 2:26	Jun 15, 1976	27 years, 157 days	Nassau Veterans Memorial Coliseum, Hempstead, New York, U.S.	Retained NABF heavyweight title
42	Win	41–1	Ron Lyle	KO	5 (12), 2:28	Jan 24, 1976	27 years, 14 days	Caesars Palace, Paradise, Nevada, U.S.	Won vacant NABF heavyweight title
41	Loss	40–1	Muhammad Ali	KO	8 (15), 2:58	Oct 30, 1974	25 years, 293 days	Stade du 20 Mai, Kinshasa, Zaire	Lost WBA, WBC, Lineal, and The Ring heavyweight titles
40	Win	40–0	Ken Norton	TKO	2 (15), 2:00	Mar 26, 1974	25 years, 75 days	Poliedro, Caracas, Venezuela	Retained WBA, WBC, and Lineal, The Ring heavyweight titles
39	Win	39–0	José Roman	KO	1 (15), 2:00	Sep 1, 1973	24 years, 234 days	Nippon Budokan, Tokyo, Japan	Retained WBA, WBC, Lineal, and The Ring heavyweight titles
38	Win	38–0	Joe Frazier	TKO	2 (15), 2:26	Jan 22, 1973	24 years, 12 days	National Stadium, Kingston, Jamaica	Won WBA, WBC, Lineal, and The Ring heavyweight titles
37	Win	37–0	Terry Sorrell	KO	2 (10), 1:05	Oct 10, 1972	23 years, 274 days	Salt Palace, Salt Lake City, Utah, U.S.	
36	Win	36–0	Miguel Angel Paez	KO	2 (10), 2:29	May 11, 1972	23 years, 122 days	County Coliseum Arena, Oakland, California, U.S.	Won Pan American heavyweight title
35	Win	35–0	Ted Gullick	KO	2 (10), 2:28	Apr 10, 1972	23 years, 91 days	The Forum, Inglewood, California, U.S.	
34	Win	34–0	Clarence Boone	KO	2 (10), 2:55	Mar 7, 1972	23 years, 57 days	Civic Center, Beaumont, Texas, U.S.	
33	Win	33–0	Joe Murphy Goodwin	KO	2 (10)	Feb 29, 1972	23 years, 50 days	Municipal Auditorium, Austin, Texas, U.S.	
32	Win	32–0	Luis Faustino Pires	RTD	4 (10), 3:00	Oct 29, 1971	22 years, 292 days	Madison Square Garden, New York City, U.S.	
31	Win	31–0	Ollie Wilson	KO	2 (10), 2:35	Oct 7, 1971	22 years, 270 days	Municipal Auditorium, San Antonio, Texas, U.S.	
30	Win	30–0	Leroy Caldwell	KO	2 (10), 1:54	Sep 21, 1971	22 years, 254 days	Beaumont, Texas, U.S.	
29	Win	29–0	Vic Scott	KO	1 (10)	Sep 14, 1971	22 years, 247 days	County Coliseum, El Paso, Texas, U.S.	
28	Win	28–0	Gregorio Peralta	TKO	10 (15), 2:52	May 10, 1971	22 years, 120 days	County Coliseum Arena, Oakland, California, U.S.	Won vacant NABF heavyweight title
27	Win	27–0	Stamford Harris	KO	2 (10), 2:58	Apr 3, 1971	22 years, 83 days	Playboy Club, Lake Geneva, Wisconsin, U.S.	
26	Win	26–0	Charlie Boston	KO	1 (10), 2:01	Feb 8, 1971	22 years, 29 days	St. Paul Auditorium, Saint Paul, Minnesota, U.S.	
25	Win	25–0	Mel Turnbow	TKO	1 (10), 2:58	Dec 18, 1970	21 years, 342 days	Center Arena, Seattle, Washington, U.S.	
24	Win	24–0	Boone Kirkman	TKO	2 (10), 0:41	Nov 18, 1970	21 years, 312 days	Madison Square Garden, New York City, U.S.	
23	Win	23–0	Lou Bailey	TKO	3 (10), 1:50	Nov 3, 1970	21 years, 297 days	State Fairgrounds International Building, Oklahoma City, Oklahoma, U.S.	
22	Win	22–0	George Chuvalo	TKO	3 (10), 1:41	Aug 4, 1970	21 years, 206 days	Madison Square Garden, New York City, U.S.	
21	Win	21–0	Roger Russell	KO	1 (10), 2:29	Jul 20, 1970	21 years, 191 days	Spectrum, Philadelphia, Pennsylvania, U.S.	
20	Win	20–0	George Johnson	TKO	7 (10), 1:41	May 16, 1970	21 years, 126 days	The Forum, Inglewood, California, U.S.	
19	Win	19–0	Aaron Eastling	TKO	4 (10), 2:24	Apr 29, 1970	21 years, 109 days	Cleveland Arena, Cleveland, Ohio, U.S.	
18	Win	18–0	James J. Woody	TKO	3 (10), 0:37	Apr 17, 1970	21 years, 97 days	Felt Forum, New York City, U.S.	
17	Win	17–0	Rufus Brassell	TKO	1 (10), 2:42	Mar 31, 1970	21 years, 80 days	Sam Houston Coliseum, Houston, Texas, U.S.	
16	Win	16–0	Gregorio Peralta	UD	10	Feb 16, 1970	21 years, 37 days	Madison Square Garden, New York City, U.S.	
15	Win	15–0	Jack O'Halloran	KO	5 (10), 1:10	Jan 26, 1970	21 years, 16 days	Madison Square Garden, New York City, U.S.	
14	Win	14–0	Charley Polite	KO	4 (10), 0:44	Jan 6, 1970	20 years, 361 days	Sam Houston Coliseum, Houston, Texas, U.S.	
13	Win	13–0	Gary Hobo Wiler	TKO	1 (10)	Dec 18, 1969	20 years, 342 days	Seattle Center Coliseum, Seattle, Washington, U.S.	
12	Win	12–0	Levi Forte	UD	10	Dec 16, 1969	20 years, 340 days	Auditorium, Miami Beach, Florida, U.S.	
11	Win	11–0	Bob Hazelton	TKO	1 (6), 1:22	Dec 6, 1969	20 years, 330 days	International Hotel, Winchester, Nevada, U.S.	
10	Win	10–0	Max Martinez	KO	2 (10), 2:35	Nov 18, 1969	20 years, 312 days	Sam Houston Coliseum, Houston, Texas, U.S.	
9	Win	9–0	Leo Peterson	KO	4 (8), 1:00	Nov 5, 1969	20 years, 299 days	Scranton, Pennsylvania, U.S.	
8	Win	8–0	Roberto Davila	UD	8	Oct 31, 1969	20 years, 294 days	Madison Square Garden, New York City, U.S.	
7	Win	7–0	Vernon Clay	TKO	2 (6), 0:32	Oct 7, 1969	20 years, 270 days	Sam Houston Coliseum, Houston, Texas, U.S.	
6	Win	6–0	Roy Wallace	KO	2 (6), 0:19	Sep 23, 1969	20 years, 256 days	Sam Houston Coliseum, Houston, Texas, U.S.	
5	Win	5–0	Johnny Carroll	KO	1 (6), 2:19	Sep 18, 1969	20 years, 251 days	Center Coliseum, Seattle, Washington, U.S.	
4	Win	4–0	Chuck Wepner	TKO	3 (10), 0:54	Aug 18, 1969	20 years, 220 days	Madison Square Garden, New York City, U.S.	
3	Win	3–0	Sylvester Dullaire	TKO	1 (6), 2:59	Jul 14, 1969	20 years, 185 days	Rosecroft Raceway, Oxon Hill, Maryland, U.S.	
2	Win	2–0	Fred Askew	KO	1 (6), 2:30	Jul 1, 1969	20 years, 172 days	Sam Houston Coliseum, Houston, Texas, U.S.	
1	Win	1–0	Donald Walheim	KO	3 (6), 1:54	Jun 23, 1969	20 years, 164 days	Madison Square Garden, New York City, U.S.	

== Exhibition boxing record ==
5 fights	3 wins	0 losses
By knockout	3	0
Non-scored	2	

No.	Result	Record	Opponent	Type	Round, time	Date	Age	Location	Notes
5	—N/a	3–0 (2)	Boone Kirkman	—N/a	3	Apr 26, 1975	26 years, 106 days	Maple Leaf Gardens, Toronto, Ontario, Canada	Non-scored bout
4	—N/a	3–0 (1)	Charlie Polite	—N/a	3	Apr 26, 1975	26 years, 106 days	Maple Leaf Gardens, Toronto, Ontario, Canada	Non-scored bout
3	Win	3–0	Terry Daniels	TKO	2 (3)	Apr 26, 1975	26 years, 106 days	Maple Leaf Gardens, Toronto, Ontario, Canada	
2	Win	2–0	Jerry Judge	TKO	2 (3)	Apr 26, 1975	26 years, 106 days	Maple Leaf Gardens, Toronto, Ontario, Canada	
1	Win	1–0	Alonzo Johnson	TKO	2 (3)	Apr 26, 1975	26 years, 106 days	Maple Leaf Gardens, Toronto, Canada	

== Titles in boxing ==
=== Major world titles ===
- WBA heavyweight champion (200+ lbs) (2×)
- WBC heavyweight champion (200+ lbs)
- IBF heavyweight champion (200+ lbs)

=== The Ring magazine titles ===
- The Ring heavyweight champion (200+ lbs)

=== Minor world titles ===
- WBU heavyweight champion (200+ lbs)
- IBA heavyweight champion (200+ lbs)

=== Regional/International titles ===
- NABF heavyweight champion (200+ lbs) (2×)
- Pan American heavyweight champion (200+ lbs)

=== Undisputed titles ===
- Undisputed heavyweight champion

=== Lineal titles ===
- Lineal heavyweight champion (200+ lbs) (2×)

== Bibliography ==
- George Foreman and Cherie Calbom (1996). George Foreman's Knock-Out-the-Fat Barbecue and Grilling Cookbook. ISBN 978-0679771494.
- George Foreman (2000). George Foreman's Big Book of Grilling Barbecue and Rotisserie: More than 75 Recipes for Family and Friends. ISBN 978-0743200929.
- George Foreman & Connie Merydith (2000). The George Foreman Lean Mean Fat Reducing Grilling Machine Cookbook. Pascoe Publishing. ISBN 978-1929862030.
- George Foreman and Joel Engel (2000). By George: The Autobiography of George Foreman. ISBN 978-0743201124.
- George Foreman (2003). George Foreman's Guide to Life: How to Get Up Off the Canvas When Life Knocks You. Simon & Schuster. ISBN 9780743224994.
- George Foreman (2004). Great Grilling Recipes! The Next Grilleration. Pascoe Publishing. ISBN 9781929862412.
- George Foreman (2004). George Foreman's Indoor Grilling Made Easy: More Than 100 Simple, Healthy Ways to Feed Family and Friends. Simon & Schuster. ISBN 978-0743266741.
- George Foreman (2005). The George Foreman Next Grilleration G5 Cookbook: Inviting. Pascoe Publishing. ISBN 978-1929862511.
- George Foreman and Fran Manushkin (2005). Let George Do It!. Simon & Schuster Children's Publishing ISBN 978-0689878077.
- George Foreman and Ken Abraham (2007). God in My Corner: A Spiritual Memoir. Thomas Nelson. ASIN: B00FDYTJS2.

== Filmography ==
=== Television ===
Television appearances and roles
Year	Title	Role	Notes
1975	The Six Million Dollar Man	Marcus Grayson	Episode: "Look Alike"
1976	Sanford and Son	Himself	Episode: "The Director"
1992	Home Improvement	Himself	Episode: "Unchained Malady"
1993	George	George Foster	Series on ABC
1996-1997	Walt Disney World Inside Out	Himself (co-host)	Series on Disney Channel
2003	King of the Hill	Himself (voice role)	Episode: "Boxing Luanne"
2013	Fast N' Loud	Himself	Episode: "Cool Customline"
2016–2018	Better Late Than Never	Himself	
2022	The Masked Singer	Venus Fly Trap	Episode: "Hall Of Fame Night"

== See also ==
- List of boxing families
- List of IBF world champions
- List of The Ring world champions
- List of undisputed world boxing champions
- List of WBA world champions
- List of WBC world champions
- List of world heavyweight boxing champions
- Texas Sports Hall of Fame

Sporting positions
Amateur boxing titles
Previous: Forrest Ward	U.S. heavyweight champion 1968	Next: Earnie Shavers
Regional boxing titles
Vacant Title last held by Muhammad Ali	NABF heavyweight champion May 10, 1971 – July 1971; Vacated	Vacant Title next held by Muhammad Ali
Vacant Title last held by Ken Norton	NABF heavyweight champion January 24, 1976 – August 1976; Vacated	Vacant Title next held by Leroy Jones
Minor world boxing titles
New title	WBU heavyweight champion April 22, 1995 – November 1997; Vacated	Vacant Title next held by Corrie Sanders
Vacant Title last held by Marcus McIntyre	IBA heavyweight champion November 3, 1996 – April 1997; Vacated	Vacant Title next held by Lou Savarese
Major world boxing titles
Preceded by Joe Frazier	WBA Heavyweight Champion; January 22, 1973 – October 30, 1974	Succeeded by Muhammad Ali
Preceded by Joe Frazier	WBC Heavyweight Champion; January 22, 1973 – October 30, 1974	Succeeded by Muhammad Ali
Preceded by Joe Frazier	The Ring heavyweight champion January 22, 1973 – October 30, 1974	Succeeded by Muhammad Ali
Preceded by Joe Frazier	Undisputed heavyweight champion January 22, 1973 – October 30, 1974	Succeeded by Muhammad Ali
Preceded by Michael Moorer	WBA heavyweight champion November 5, 1994 – March 5, 1995; Stripped	Vacant Title next held by Bruce Seldon
Preceded by Michael Moorer	IBF heavyweight champion November 5, 1994 – June 29, 1995; Vacated	Vacant Title next held by Michael Moorer
Awards
Previous: Muhammad Ali; Carlos Monzón	The Ring Fighter of the Year; 1973	Next: Muhammad Ali
Previous: Carlos Monzón	BWAA Fighter of the Year; 1973	Next: Muhammad Ali
Previous: Bob Foster vs. Chris Finnegan	The Ring Fight of the Year vs. Joe Frazier; 1973	Next: George Foreman vs. Muhammad Ali
Previous: Muhammad Ali vs. Bob Foster; Round 5	The Ring Round of the Year vs. Joe Frazier; Round 2; 1973	Next: George Foreman vs. Muhammad Ali; Round 8
Previous: George Foreman vs. Joe Frazier	The Ring Fight of the Year vs. Muhammad Ali; 1974	Next: Muhammad Ali vs. Joe Frazier III
Previous: George Foreman vs. Joe Frazier; Round 2	The Ring Round of the Year vs. Muhammad Ali; Round 8; 1974	Next: Muhammad Ali vs. Joe Frazier III; Round 12
Previous: Muhammad Ali	The Ring Fighter of the Year; 1976	Next: Carlos Zárate Serna
Previous: Muhammad Ali vs. Joe Frazier III	The Ring Fight of the Year vs. Ron Lyle; 1976	Next: George Foreman vs. Jimmy Young
Previous: Muhammad Ali vs. Joe Frazier III; Round 12	The Ring Round of the Year vs. Ron Lyle; Rounds 4, 5; 1976	Next: George Foreman vs. Jimmy Young; Round 12
Previous: George Foreman vs. Ron Lyle	The Ring Fight of the Year vs. Jimmy Young; 1977	Next: Leon Spinks vs. Muhammad Ali
Previous: George Foreman vs. Ron Lyle; Rounds 4, 5	The Ring Round of the Year vs. Jimmy Young; Round 12; 1977	Next: Leon Spinks vs. Muhammad Ali; Round 15
Previous: Pernell Whitaker	BWAA Fighter of the Year; 1994	Next: Oscar De La Hoya
Previous: Michael Jordan	Associated Press Athlete of the Year; 1994	Next: Cal Ripken Jr.
Heavyweight status
Preceded by Muhammad Ali	Oldest living world champion June 3, 2016 – March 21, 2025	Succeeded by Larry Holmes
