= Waldheim =

Waldheim may refer to:

== Places ==
- Waldheim, Saskatchewan, a town in Saskatchewan, Canada
- Waldheim, Saxony, a town in Saxony, Germany
- Waldheim (Hanover), a suburban district of Hanover, Germany
- Waldheim (Umm al 'Amad) or Alonei Abba, an Evangelical settlement of 1907 in northern Israel
- Valdgeym, or Waldheim, a rural locality in the Jewish Autonomous Oblast, Russia
- Waldheim, the home of Gustav Weindorfer which was instrumental in establishing Cradle Mountain National Park in Tasmania, Australia
- Waldheim, the country home of James Speyer, an American banker
- German Waldheim Cemetery, now Forest Home Cemetery in Forest Park, Illinois

== People with the surname ==
- Gotthelf Fischer von Waldheim (1771–1853), German-Russian zoologist, anatomist, entomologist and paleontologist
- Alexandr Alexandrovich Fischer von Waldheim (1839–1920), Russian botanist, grandson of the above
- Elisabeth Waldheim (1922–2017), Kurt Waldheim's widow and a former first lady of Austria
- Kurt Waldheim (1918–2007), President of Austria and Secretary-General of the UN
- Donald Walheim (born 1939), American professional heavyweight boxer
- Zanis Waldheims (1909–1993), Latvian painter

== See also ==
- German Waldheim Cemetery
