= Hero and the Terror =

1988 film by William Tannen

- Theatrical release poster
- Directed by: William Tannen
- Screenplay by: Dennis Shryack; Michael Blodgett
- Based on: Hero and the Terror by Michael Blodgett
- Produced by: Menahem Golan; Yoram Globus; Lance Hool
- Starring: Chuck Norris; Brynn Thayer; Steve James; Jack O'Halloran
- Cinematography: Eric Van Haren Noman
- Edited by: Christian Wagner
- Music by: David Michael Frank
- Distributed by: Cannon Films
- Release date: August 26, 1988 (United States)
- Running time: 96 minutes
- Country: United States
- Language: English
- Box office: $5,000,000 (USA)

Hero and the Terror is a 1988 American action film starring martial arts star Chuck Norris, directed by William Tannen. Produced by Menahem Golan, written by Michael Blodgett, and was distributed by Cannon Films. The film stars Norris as Danny O'Brien, a cop trying to stop serial killer Simon Moon, known as "The Terror".

It is based on Michael Blodgett's 1982 novel of the same name.

== Plot ==
Danny O'Brien is a Los Angeles cop who likes to work alone, and who never waits for backup. O'Brien determines to apprehend the notorious Simon Moon, also known as The Terror, who kills women by snapping their necks and then takes their bodies to his lair at an abandoned amusement park. Danny is attacked by Simon, who almost kills him in the struggle. Fleeing the scene, the Terror falls from a ladder and knocks himself unconscious. When backup arrives, everyone believes that O'Brien caught The Terror; he is christened a "Hero" by the press, while Simon is hauled off to jail.

When Dr. Highwater goes to visit Simon, he escapes by cutting through the bars of his cell. He then steals a laundry van by push-starting it, but loses control and crashes into a cliff-face. The media pronounces Simon dead, much to the public relief.

Three years later, women start turning up murdered again; O'Brien suspects that The Terror might not be dead after all. O'Brien eventually finds The Terror's lair in a movie theater. Heading in to confront Simon, Danny encounters an enclosed room not on the map...wherein he finds numerous bodies, all victims of The Terror. Simon ambushes Danny, who fights him off and eventually kills him.

O'Brien marries his girlfriend. She gives birth to their daughter Angela, "our little angel".

== Cast ==
- Chuck Norris as Detective Danny O'Brien
- Brynn Thayer as Kay
- Steve James as Robinson
- Jack O'Halloran as Simon Moon
- Jeffrey Kramer as Dwight
- Ron O'Neal as Mayor
- Murphy Dunne as Theater Manager
- Heather Blodgett as Betsy
- Tony DiBenedetto as Dobeny
- Billy Drago as Dr. Highwater
- Joe Guzaldo as Copelli
- Peter Miller as Chief Bridges
- Karen Witter as Ginger
- Lorry Goldman as Ginger's Manager
- Christine Wagner as Doctor

== Production ==
Hero and the Terror was Chuck Norris's first major attempt at diversifying from his traditional martial arts roles.

"The success of the film is contingent on how reviewers, the media and the audience take to it. That determines everything in this business", Norris said. "I like the character of Danny O'Brien and I like the relationships I had in the film, especially with Kay (played by Brynn Thayer). I liked seeing not just the man in the arena or the fighting machine you see in many of my films, but to see the man outside the arena -- the guy who also has relationships".

"I don't want people to think I'm just going to kick butt. There's a lot more here," said Norris. "What makes this a different film is the vulnerability of the character I play. There are moments of humor, romance and compassion, and there are moments of terror, anguish and anxiety." A scene was filmed as a joke where Norris hyperventilates in the hospital and faints seeing a baby being born. The director, William Tannen, convinced Norris to test the film with the segment intact. "We did leave it in. And you know, women absolutely love that scene," he said.

"O'Brien is a guy who must face his fear, even though he feels secure in his abilities as a police officer," Norris said. "He doesn't even wait for his backup unit and goes after the killer alone. Chuck Norris fans will see the intense, focused sort of man, sure; also, I hope they will identify with the other side of his character, the multiple side...I trained really hard for this film. Jack and I did all our own fighting, and he's really strong. I threw everything short of the kitchen sink at him and every type of kick imaginable. People will believe that O'Brien really is facing a demon."

== Release ==
=== Theatrical ===
The film premiered on August 26, 1988, in the United States.

=== Home media ===
It was released on Blu-ray for the first time in June 2015, by Kino Lorber.

== Reception ==
=== Box office ===
Hero and the Terror grossed $1.84 million nationwide in its first weekend at the box office, finishing in 12th place for that weekend. The film made just $6 million overall.

=== Critical response ===
The movie had a mostly negative reception and has a 0% rating on movie rating website Rotten Tomatoes.

Kevin Thomas of the Los Angeles Times said, "With 'Hero and the Terror' Chuck Norris makes his most determined effort yet to balance his martial arts displays with serious acting. On a modest level Norris succeeds, only to be tripped up by an underdeveloped script".

Richard Harrington of The Washington Post called the film "a typically slow and uninspired go-round", adding "it probably won't do any good, but here goes: Be very careful and avoid this 'Hero'".

Roger Ebert of the Chicago Sun-Times awarded the film two out of four stars, remarking that "A new Chuck Norris is unveiled in 'Hero and the Terror', which contains its share of martial arts combat, to be sure, but also shows him as a sensitive romantic who makes small talk over candlelit dinners and wants to be present for the birth of his daughter. There is nothing in the basic story of 'Hero and the Terror' that really requires Norris to reveal these tender new aspects to his character, but perhaps he simply put them in because he liked them. Norris is a gentle and intelligent man, and maybe he grew tired of kicking people in the face in the movies".

Michael Mills of The Palm Beach Post gave it one and a half stars, but appreciated the photography, the production design, and Norris's acting and range expansion. He felt that it the film fell apart due to his script and wrote "there's not an iota of originality in the script, which drags us through the same well-worn territory covered by any number of other movies."

Jack Garner in his review published in Lansing State Journal gave it a 6 on a scale of 10. Garner explained that Hero and the Terror "is an entertaining, suspenseful and decidedly change-of pace thriller for the star of the Cannon films stable. Unlike most Cannon fodder, Hero and the Terror offers an appealing, multidimensional central character, well played by Norris in a manner that suggests that the martial arts athlete-turned-actor is progressing in the move from karate action to drama."

Michael H. Price of the Fort Worth Star-Telegram gave it an 8 on a scale of 10, and said the film "is an involving thriller that stands with the best of its kind." He praised the cast and the direction. On Norris's performance he found it "engaging" and said that it "proves him capable of stretching beyond his customary loner stance to function convincingly as a romantic lead."

== See also ==
- List of American films of 1988
- Chuck Norris filmography
