= Jack O'Halloran =

American actor and former professional boxer (b. 1943)

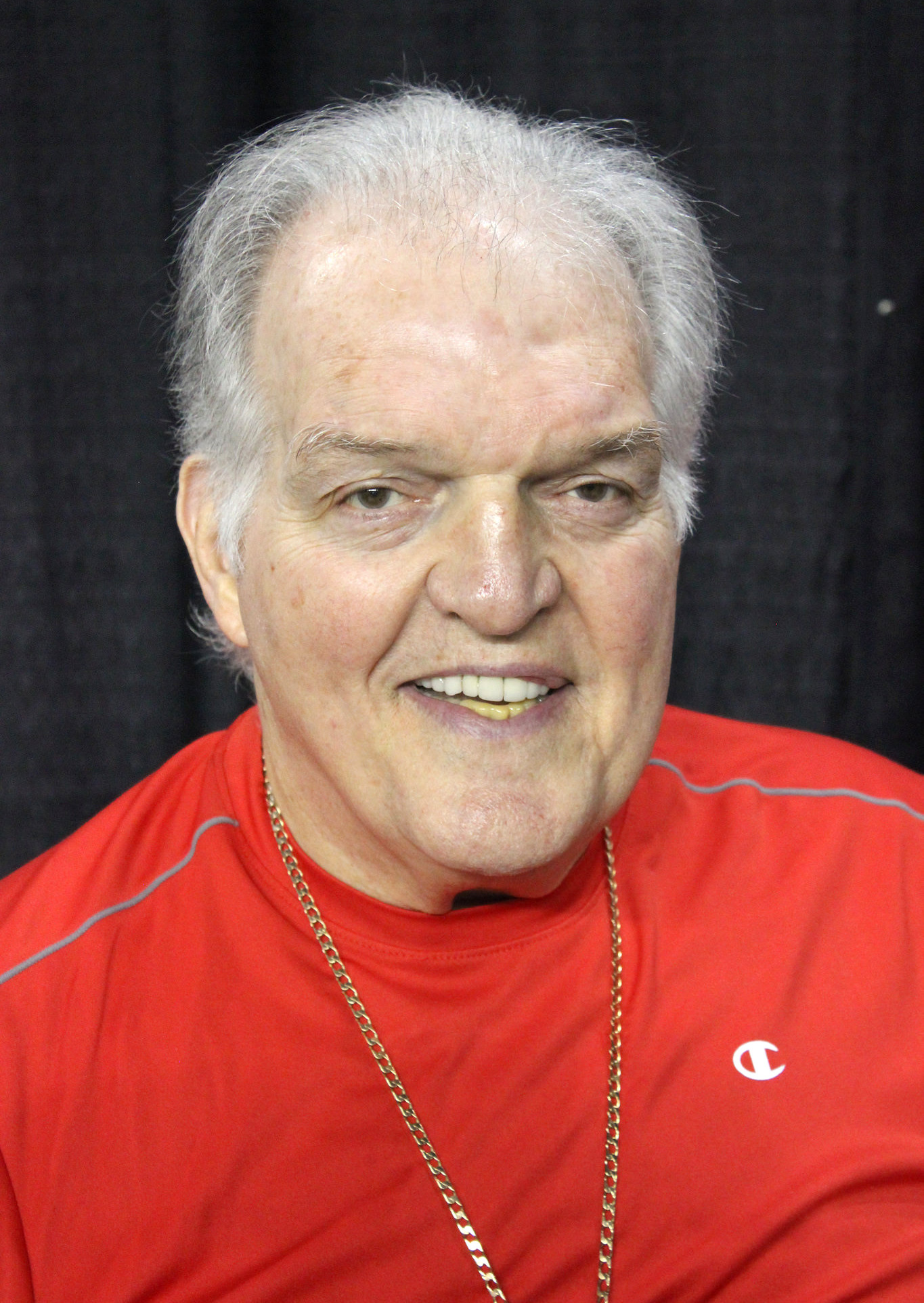
- O'Halloran at the 2017 O Comic Con in Council Bluffs, Iowa, July 2017
- Born: Jack O'Halloran; April 8, 1943 (age 83); Philadelphia, Pennsylvania, U.S.
- Occupations: Boxer; actor
- Years active: 1966–1974 (boxing); 1975–present (acting)
- Spouse: Ciara O’Leary
- Boxing career
- Nicknames: The Giant; Irish
- Height: 6 ft 6 in, 1.98 m
- Weight: Heavyweight
- Reach: 83 in (211 cm)
- Stance: Orthodox

Boxing record
- Total fights: 57
- Wins: 34
- Win by KO: 17
- Losses: 21
- Draws: 2

Jack O'Halloran (born April 8, 1943) is an American actor and former professional boxer. As a heavyweight, he fought in 57 professional boxing matches (including fights with future heavyweight champions George Foreman and Ken Norton) between 1966 and 1974.

He then made his film acting debut in Farewell, My Lovely (1975) and played notable roles in King Kong (1976), as Non in Superman (1978) and its sequel Superman II (1980), the comedy Dragnet (1987), the Chuck Norris vehicle Hero and the Terror (1988), and the 1994 live-action film version of The Flintstones.

== Early life ==
O'Halloran was born in Philadelphia, and grew up with his mother, Mary, and stepfather, Peter Paul Patrick O'Halloran. In his book Family Legacy, he claimed to be the illegitimate son of mafia hitman and crime boss Albert Anastasia. He lived in Runnemede, New Jersey, where he attended Triton Regional High School.

== Boxing career ==
Fighting as "Irish" Jack O'Halloran from Boston, he was a heavyweight boxing contender active from 1966 to 1974. The 6'6" O'Halloran was undefeated in his first 16 professional fights, with a career record of 34 wins, 21 losses and 2 draws.

During his boxing career, O'Halloran defeated former title contenders Cleveland Williams and Manuel Ramos. He also defeated Danny McAlinden, who won a bronze medal in boxing at the 1966 British Empire and Commonwealth Games in Kingston, Jamaica and later became the British and Commonwealth Heavyweight Champion. O'Halloran's losses included defeats to Joe Roman (twice), Joe Bugner, Ron Lyle, and future heavyweight champions George Foreman and Ken Norton.

In 1973, O'Halloran was close to attaining a match against Muhammad Ali when he was knocked out by Jimmy Summerville. That ended his chances to fight Ali. Although O'Halloran went on to defeat Summerville by K.O. in a rematch, with only three more wins and five losses he was never again a serious heavyweight contender. O'Halloran however knocked out Ali's younger brother Rahaman in Rahaman's final fight in September 1972. That was Rahaman's only stoppage defeat. The California Boxing Hall of Fame listed O'Halloran as one of its inductees of the 2009 HOF class.

== Acting career ==
Retiring from boxing in 1974, O'Halloran turned to acting and he won the role of ex-convict Moose Malloy in the 1975 film Farewell, My Lovely, featuring Robert Mitchum as private eye Philip Marlowe. After Farewell, My Lovely O'Halloran was offered other roles, some of which he turned down, including the role of Jaws in The Spy Who Loved Me which went to Richard Kiel.

=== Superman film series ===
He acquired other roles as tough henchmen which culminated in the role he is best known for, Non, the menacing but mute member of the trio of Kryptonian supervillains banished to the Phantom Zone by Jor-El (Marlon Brando) in Superman (1978) and inadvertently released by Superman in Superman II (1980). In an interview O'Halloran said that it was his idea to make Non a childlike character, having difficulty adjusting to his newfound powers and making sounds in the absence of voice. He criticized Alexander and Ilya Salkind, the producers of the Superman films, for their mishandling of the franchise, believing that their firing of director Richard Donner was a huge blow to the series and the cause of its downturn in quality, a sentiment that was shared by Gene Hackman, who refused to reprise his Lex Luthor role in the third film, and by Margot Kidder who played Lois Lane.

In an interview with Starlog Magazine in 2006, O'Halloran talked about how he and Christopher Reeve did not get along during the making of Superman II. On one occasion, he had Reeve against a wall, but Richard Donner intervened and dissuaded him from hitting Reeve. O'Halloran later discussed the incident on the How Did This Get Made? podcast's Episode 24.1. Despite the clash, O'Halloran said that his heart went out to Reeve after his 1995 accident and commended him for helping others with spinal cord injuries.

=== Other acting roles ===
O'Halloran has also played supporting roles in King Kong (1976), March or Die (1977), The Baltimore Bullet (1980), Dragnet (1987), Hero and the Terror (1988), Mob Boss (1990), The Flintstones (1994), and Dagon Troll World Chronicles (2019).

== Other ventures ==
In 2008, O'Halloran announced plans to enter into a partnership with veteran Hollywood executive Jay Samit to create Long Beach Studios, a chain of film studio facilities throughout the United States. In 2010, O'Halloran released Family Legacy. The book outlines O'Halloran's relationship with his alleged father, a former boss of the Gambino crime family, Albert Anastasia.

== Filmography ==
Year	Title	Role	Notes
1975	Farewell, My Lovely	"Moose" Malloy	
1976	King Kong	Joe Perko	
1977	March or Die	Ivan	
1978	Superman	Non	
1980	Superman II	Non	
1980	The Baltimore Bullet	Max	
1987	Dragnet	Emil Muzz	
1988	Hero and the Terror	Simon Moon	
1990	Mob Boss	Angelo	
1994	Huck and the King of Hearts	Truck	
1994	The Flintstones	Yeti	
2011	Superman: Requiem	Shuttle Commander (voice)	
2016	Enter the Fist and the Golden Fleece	FDA Super Agent	
2016	Crystal's Shadow	Alistair	
2019	Dagon: Troll World Chronicles	Prime Minister	
2021	John Fox	Dr. Lynch	

== Professional boxing record ==
34 Wins (17 knockouts, 17 decisions), 21 Losses (8 knockouts, 13 decisions), 2 Draws
Result	Record	Opponent	Type	Round	Date	Location	Notes
Loss	34-21-2	(United States) Howard Smith	KO	6	August 16, 1974	(United States) San Diego Coliseum, San Diego, California, U.S.	California Heavyweight Title. O'Halloran knocked out at 2:36 of the sixth round
Win	34-20-2	(Samoa) Koroseta Kid	TKO	9	July 12, 1974	(United States) San Diego Coliseum, San Diego, California, U.S.	Referee stopped the bout at 1:28 of the ninth round
Win	33-20-2	(United States) Danny Lee	PTS	10	June 6, 1974	(United States) Bronco Bowl, Dallas, Texas, U.S.	
Loss	32-20-2	(United States) Larry Middleton	KO	9	December 5, 1973	(United States) Baltimore Civic Center, Baltimore, Maryland, U.S.	
Loss	32-19-2	(Tonga) Koli Vailea	PTS	10	October 31, 1973	(United States) Winchester, Nevada, U.S.	
Loss	32-18-2	(United States) Boone Kirkman	UD	10	July 12, 1973	(United States) Seattle Center Coliseum, Seattle, Washington, U.S.	
Loss	32-17-2	(United States) Howard Smith	PTS	10	June 8, 1973	(United States) San Diego Coliseum, San Diego, California, U.S.	
Win	32-16-2	(United States) Charlie Reno	UD	12	May 16, 1973	(United States) Stockton, California, U.S.	California Heavyweight Title.
Win	31-16-2	(United States) Jimmy Summerville	TKO	7	April 24, 1973	(United States) Miami Beach Auditorium, Miami Beach, Florida, U.S.	
Loss	30-16-2	(United States) Jimmy Summerville	KO	9	March 20, 1973	(United States) Miami Beach Auditorium, Miami Beach, Florida, U.S.	
Win	30-15-2	(United States) Alvin Lewis	PTS	10	March 1, 1973	(United States) Olympia Stadium, Detroit, Michigan, U.S.	
Win	29-15-2	(United States) Robie Harris	KO	5	November 8, 1972	(United States) San Diego Coliseum, San Diego, California, U.S.	California Heavyweight Title.
Win	28-14-2	(United States) Rico Brooks	KO	6	October 28, 1972	(United States) Denver, Colorado, U.S.	
Win	27-15-2	(United States) Rahaman Ali	KO	8	September 13, 1972	(United States) San Diego Coliseum, San Diego, California, U.S.	
Win	26-15-2	(United States) Henry Clark	PTS	12	August 9, 1972	(United States) San Diego Coliseum, San Diego, California, U.S.	California Heavyweight Title.
Win	25-15-2	(United States) Vic Scott	TKO	3	July 14, 1972	(United States) San Diego Coliseum, San Diego, California, U.S.	
Loss	24-15-2	(United States) Henry Clark	UD	10	June 16, 1972	(United States) San Diego Coliseum, San Diego, California, U.S.	
Win	24-14-2	(United States) Fred Lewis	PTS	10	May 25, 1972	(United States) San Diego Coliseum, San Diego, California, U.S.	
Win	23-14-2	(United States) Steve Grant	KO	3	April 12, 1972	(United States) San Diego Coliseum, San Diego, California, U.S.	
Loss	22-14-2	(United States) Ken Norton	UD	10	March 17, 1972	(United States) San Diego Coliseum, San Diego, California, U.S.	
Win	22-13-2	(United States) Charlie Harris	PTS	10	February 1, 1972	(United States) Houston, Texas, U.S.	
Loss	21-13-2	(United States) Ron Lyle	KO	4	November 26, 1971	(United States) Denver, Colorado, U.S.	
Win	21-12-2	(United States) Cleveland Williams	SD	10	September 21, 1971	(United States) Houston, Texas, U.S.	
Win	20-12-2	(United States) Terry Daniels	TKO	4	August 24, 1971	(United States) Sam Houston Coliseum, Houston, Texas, U.S.	
Loss	19-12-2	(United States) Ron Stander	UD	10	July 29, 1971	(United States) Omaha Civic Auditorium, Omaha, Nebraska, U.S.	
Loss	19-11-2	(United States) Johnny Griffin	UD	10	June 29, 1971	(United States) Cleveland Arena, Cleveland, Ohio, U.S.	
Loss	19-10-2	(United Kingdom) Jack Bodell	KO	4	February 24, 1971	(United Kingdom) Wolverhampton Civic Hall, Wolverhampton, England	
Loss	19-9-2	(United States) Dave Matthews	UD	10	September 14, 1970	(United States) Akron Armory, Akron, Ohio, U.S.	
Win	19-8-2	(Northern Ireland) Danny McAlinden	PTS	8	July 6, 1970	(United Kingdom) Mayfair Sporting Club, London, England	
Loss	18-8-2	(Puerto Rico) José Roman	PTS	10	May 25, 1970	(United States) Tampa, Florida, U.S.	
Loss	18-7-2	(United States) Mac Foster	KO	1	April 9, 1970	(United States) Olympic Auditorium, Los Angeles, U.S.	O'Halloran knocked out at 2:58 of the first round
Loss	18-6-2	(United States) George Foreman	KO	5	January 26, 1970	(United States) Madison Square Garden, New York City, New York, U.S.	O'Halloran knocked out at 1:10 of the fifth round
Win	18-5-2	(Mexico) Manuel "Pulgarcito" Ramos	KO	7	October 17, 1969	(United States) Great Western Forum, Inglewood, California, U.S.	
Draw	17-5-2	(South Africa) Jimmy Richards	PTS	8	October 4, 1969	Ellis Park Stadium, Johannesburg, South Africa	
Loss	17-5-1	(United States) Al Jones	TKO	3	August 19, 1969	(United States) Miami Beach Auditorium, Miami Beach, Florida, U.S.	
Win	17-4-1	(Wales) Carl Gizzi	PTS	10	July 7, 1969	(United Kingdom) Mayfair Sporting Club, London, England	
Loss	16-4-1	(United States) Tony Doyle	PTS	10	May 28, 1969	(United States) Silver Slipper, Paradise, Nevada, U.S.	
Loss	16-3-1	(United Kingdom) Joe Bugner	PTS	8	April 15, 1969	(United Kingdom) Royal Albert Hall, London, England	
Win	16-2-1	(United States) Bobby Lee Hines	TKO	2	March 27, 1969	(United States) Roseland Ballroom, Taunton, Massachusetts, U.S.	
Loss	15-2-1	(Puerto Rico) José Roman	PTS	10	March 15, 1969	San Juan, Puerto Rico	
Loss	15-1-1	(United States) Charlie Harris	PTS	8	September 6, 1968	(United States) Scranton, Pennsylvania, U.S.	
Win	15-0-1	(United States) Mike Bruce	KO	7	April 23, 1968	(United States) Walpole, Massachusetts, U.S.	
Win	14-0-1	(United States) Charley Polite	TKO	7	March 26, 1968	(United States) Four Seasons Arena, Walpole, Massachusetts, U.S.	
Win	13-0-1	(United States) Buddy Moore	KO	3	November 15, 1967	(United States) Scranton, Pennsylvania, U.S.	
Win	12-0-1	(United States) Richard Benjamin	PTS	6	October 2, 1967	(United States) Philadelphia Arena, Philadelphia, Pennsylvania, U.S.	
Win	11-0-1	(United States) Bobby Lee Hines	KO	4	August 31, 1967	(United States) Philadelphia Arena, Philadelphia, Pennsylvania, U.S.	Not to be confused with Robert Hines
Win	10-0-1	(United States) Bobby Lee Hines	KO	6	July 24, 1967	(United States) Four Seasons Arena, Walpole, Massachusetts, U.S.	
Win	9-0-1	(United States) Tommy Sheehan	PTS	4	July 19, 1967	(United States) Madison Square Garden, New York City, New York, U.S.	
Win	8-0-1	(United States) Mike Bruce	PTS	6	June 5, 1967	(United States) Four Seasons Arena, Walpole, Massachusetts, U.S.	
Win	7-0-1	(United States) Tommy Clark	UD	6	May 15, 1967	(United States) Boston Arena, Boston, Massachusetts, U.S.	
Draw	6-0-1	(United States) Roosevelt Eddie	PTS	4	May 9, 1967	(United States) Boston Arena, Boston, Massachusetts, U.S.	
Win	6-0	(United States) Danny Swears	PTS	4	May 2, 1967	(United States) Boston Arena, Boston, Massachusetts, U.S.	
Win	5-0	(United States) Hal Moffett	UD	4	April 18, 1967	(United States) Boston Arena, Boston, Massachusetts, U.S.	
Win	4-0	(United States) Woody Goss	PTS	4	March 6, 1967	(United States) Philadelphia Arena, Philadelphia, Pennsylvania, U.S.	
Win	3-0	(United States) Woody Goss	PTS	4	November 22, 1966	(United States) Philadelphia Arena, Philadelphia, Pennsylvania, U.S.	
Win	2-0	(United States) Bob Hazelton	TKO	1	October 10, 1966	(United States) Philadelphia Arena, Philadelphia, Pennsylvania, U.S.	
Win	1-0	Joe Pinto	TKO	1	September 22, 1966	(United States) Reading Municipal Stadium, Reading, Pennsylvania, U.S.	Referee stopped the bout at 1:17 of the first round
