= George Foreman vs. José Roman =

Boxing competition

- Date: September 1, 1973
- Venue: Nippon Budokan, Tokyo, Japan
- Title(s) on the line: WBA, WBC and The Ring undisputed heavyweight championship

Tale of the tape
| Boxer | George Foreman | José Roman |
| Nickname | Big | King |
| Hometown | Houston, Texas, U.S. | Vega Baja, Puerto Rico |
| Purse | $1,000,000 | $100,000 |
| Pre-fight record | 38–0 (35 KO) | 43–7–1 (21 KO) |
| Age | 24 years, 7 months | 26 years, 8 months |
| Height | 6 ft 4 in (193 cm) | 5 ft 10 in (178 cm) |
| Weight | 219 lb (99 kg) | 196 1/2 lb (89 kg) |
| Style | Orthodox | Orthodox |
| Recognition | WBA, WBC and The Ring undisputed Heavyweight Champion | WBA/WBC; No. 9 Ranked Heavyweight |

Result
- Foreman wins via 1st-round KO

George Foreman vs. José Roman was a professional boxing match contested on September 1, 1973, for the undisputed heavyweight championship.

== Background ==
In his previous fight, George Foreman had dominated Joe Frazier, knocking the champion down six times in less than two rounds to become the new undisputed heavyweight champion on January 22, 1973. For his first defense, it was announced that Foreman would travel to Tokyo to take on little-known Puerto Rican challenger Jose "King" Roman. Prior to landing his title match against Foreman, Roman had little success at that point, fighting mostly unknown journeyman, losing seven times and was not viewed as a legit threat to take Foreman's titles. Roman would nevertheless make history as the fourth Hispanic and first Puerto Rican fighter to challenge for a major heavyweight title. The fight was also the first heavyweight title bout to take place in Japan and would remain the only one until Mike Tyson successfully defended his undisputed heavyweight title in the Tokyo Dome against Tony Tubbs in 1988.

== The fight ==
Foreman would make quick work of Roman, ending the fight after just two minutes and making it one of the shortest heavyweight title fights in history. A little over a minute into the fight, Foreman had Roman up against the ropes and landed several powerful punches that put Roman down. Roman was able to get back up and continue on, but Foreman quickly resumed his attack and caught Roman flush with a right hook that sent Roman crashing to the mat. Roman again answered the referee's count, but Foreman would quickly hit Roman with a right uppercut that put Roman down for the count. Foreman was named the winner by knockout at 2:00 of the first round.

== Aftermath ==
Foreman would next face Ken Norton in Caracas, Venezuela.

== Undercard ==
Confirmed bouts:

- Ricardo Arredondo (Mexico) KO6 Morito Kashiwaba (Japan)

(Retains World Boxing Council world Junior Lightweight title)

- Terry Hinke (United States) KO Richard Pittman (United States) Heavyweights
- Takatsune Shimisu (Japan) WD Harbar Watanabe (Japan)
- Kazuo Aikawa (Japan) WD Shikara Igarashi (Japan)
- Hisami Numatya (Japan) WD Hiroshi ishibashi (Japan)

== Broadcasting ==
| Country | Broadcaster |
|---|---|
| Mexico | Televisa |
| Philippines | KBS 9 |
| United Kingdom | BBC |

| Preceded by vs. Joe Frazier | George Foreman's bouts 1 September 1973 | Succeeded by vs. Ken Norton |
| Preceded by vs. Clyde Brown | José Roman's bouts 1 September 1973 | Succeeded by vs. Pedro Agosto |
