= Jack Hurley =

American boxing promoter

Jack Hurley (December 9, 1897 – November 16, 1972) was an American boxing promoter. Working in boxing for over 50 years, he was well known and appreciated both in the sport and by journalists, although he never managed a champion.

Hurley grew up in Fargo, North Dakota. After serving in France during World War I, he tried boxing, but found he was better suited for managing and promoting fighters. Starting in 1922 he had success managing lightweight Billy Petrolle. After Petrolle retired, he became a promoter in Chicago. By the late 1940s he was back to managing, including Harry "Kid" Matthews. He later moved on to Seattle, where he spent the last 20 years of his career. In 1956 he promoted for the National Championships, hosted in Texas, where Danny Watkins Won the Tournament. He managed Boone Kirkman among other fighters in Seattle. In 1957 he promoted the title world heavyweight title fight between Pete Rademacher, in his first professional match, against Floyd Patterson. As the first fight between an amateur and a world champion, it drew attention, controversy and money.

Hurley conveyed honesty in a sport where "a certain amount of dishonesty is not only expected but also demanded". In Seattle he was called ""the conscience of Seattle". Writer Damon Runyon said he was one of only two honest prize-fighter managers he had known, "and I forget the name of the other". Boxing historian John Ochs published a three-volume biography in 2017.
