= José Roman (boxer) =

Puerto Rican former boxer

Jose Roman
Personal information
- Nickname: King
- Nationality: Puerto Rican
- Born: Jose Roman; December 17, 1946 (age 79) Vega Baja, Puerto Rico
- Height: 5 ft 10 in (1.78 m)
- Weight: Heavyweight

Boxing career
- Reach: 71 in (180 cm)
- Stance: Orthodox

Boxing record
- Total fights: 85
- Wins: 53
- Win by KO: 27
- Losses: 27
- Draws: 4
- No contests: 1

José "King" Roman (born December 17, 1946) is a Puerto Rican former boxer who was Puerto Rico's first world heavyweight championship challenger. He is known as "Joe King Roman." He holds notable victories over Manuel Ramos and ex-Light Heavyweight champion Vicente Rondon.

== Pro career ==
In Roman's early career, he achieved mixed results. He defeated people like Jack O'Halloran and Chuck Wepner but lost to Jack Bodell. After the Bodell loss, Roman had a win-streak, defeating O'Halloran once again and besting Manuel Ramos. He lost to Robie Harris but put together a streak of wins before fighting George Foreman.

=== Foreman Fight ===
In late August 1973, he travelled to Tokyo, Japan, to challenge world Heavyweight champion George Foreman, losing by a knockout in the first round on September 1. Roman's corner protested that Foreman hit him while Roman was down, although no action was taken on this complaint. Photos exist that seem to corroborate Roman's corner's version of events. Even though he lost, he made history by becoming the first Puerto Rican to challenge for the world's Heavyweight championship. The only fellow Puerto Ricans to challenge for the heavyweight championship are Ossie Ocasio, Fres Oquendo and John Ruiz, who later became the first Latino to hold a version of the heavyweight championship.

=== Afterwards ===
Roman held a win over former WBA world Light Heavyweight champion Vicente Rondon just after the Foreman fight, his first win afterwards. In 1975 he lost to Mike Quarry and later in the year he began a series of losses. He lost seven times, notably losing to Jimmy Young. Roman was defeated by Boone Kirkman afterwards, in 1977, but never achieved a notable fight afterwards, having a mixed record.

== Retirement ==
Roman retired in 1981 with a record of 54 wins, 27 losses and 4 draws, with 27 knockout wins. He used to work at a Sweetbay Supermarket in Tampa, Florida. Ossie Ocasio and Fres Oquendo also challenged for the world's heavyweight championship, both are also from Puerto Rico. Ruiz was born in the USA of Puerto Rican ancestry.

== Professional boxing record ==
86 fights	54 wins	27 losses
By knockout	27	11
By decision	27	16
Draws	4	
No contests	1	

No.	Result	Record	Opponent	Type	Round, time	Date	Location	Notes
87	Loss	54–27–4 (1)	(United States) Tony Severance	KO	5	March 19, 1981	(United States) Tampa, Florida	
86	Loss	54–26–4 (1)	(Italy) Alfio Righetti	KO	2	November 10, 1978	(Italy) Milan, Lombardy	
85	Loss	54–25–4 (1)	(United States) Glenn Morgan	TKO	7	August 10, 1978	(United States) Curtis Hixon Hall, Tampa, Florida	
82	Loss	54–24–4 (1)	(United States) Ibar Arrington	TKO	8	June 20, 1978	(United States) Seattle Center Coliseum, Seattle, Washington	
81	Win	54–23–4 (1)	(Canada) George Jerome	TKO	8	May 23, 1978	(United States) Bellingham, Washington	
80	Loss	53–23–4 (1)	(United States) Walter E. Moore Jr.	UD	10	April 28, 1978	(United States) International Amphitheatre, Chicago, Illinois	
79	Draw	53–22–4 (1)	(United States) Levi Forte	PTS	10	March 17, 1978	(United States) War Memorial Auditorium, Fort Lauderdale, Florida	
78	Loss	53–22–3 (1)	(The Bahamas) Bobby Lloyd	UD	15	January 19, 1978	(United States) Fort Homer W. Hesterly Armory, Tampa, Florida	For Florida Heavyweight Title
77	Win	53–21–3 (1)	(United States) John L Carter	UD	10	December 1, 1977	(United States) Fort Homer W. Hesterly Armory, Tampa, Florida	
76	Win	52–21–3 (1)	(Canada) George Jerome	TKO	9	October 1, 1977	(United States) Butte, Montana	
75	Loss	51–21–3 (1)	(United States) Marlin Lewis	UD	12	September 8, 1977	(United States) Tampa, Florida	
74	Draw	51–20–3 (1)	(United States) Marlin Lewis	PTS	10	August 5, 1977	(United States) Curtis Hixon Hall, Tampa, Florida	
73	Win	51–20–2 (1)	(United States) Terry Daniels	UD	10	May 25, 1977	(United States) Sports Arena, Anchorage, Alaska	
72	Loss	50–20–2 (1)	(The Bahamas) Bobby Lloyd	PTS	15	May 7, 1977	(United States) Fort Lauderdale, Florida	For Florida Heavyweight Title
71	Loss	50–19–2 (1)	(United States) Boone Kirkman	UD	10	April 26, 1977	(United States) Seattle Center Arena, Seattle, Washington	
70	Win	50–18–2 (1)	(United States) Ernie Smith	TKO	4	March 23, 1977	(United States) Anchorage, Alaska	
69	Win	49–18–2 (1)	(United States) Ibar Arrington	SD	10	February 15, 1977	(United States) Seattle Center Arena, Seattle, Washington	
68	Win	48–18–2 (1)	(United States) James Anthony	KO	5	February 2, 1977	(United States) Sports Arena, Anchorage, Alaska	
67	Loss	47–18–2 (1)	(United States) Ibar Arrington	MD	10	October 12, 1976	(United States) Seattle Center Coliseum, Seattle, Washington	
66	Loss	47–17–2 (1)	(United States) Fred Houpe	TKO	10	June 15, 1976	(United States) Nassau Coliseum, Uniondale, New York	
65	Loss	47–16–2 (1)	(United States) Randy Stephens	PTS	10	June 1, 1976	(United States) Miami Beach Convention Center, Miami Beach, Florida	
64	Loss	47–15–2 (1)	(United States) Jimmy Young	PTS	10	February 20, 1976	(Puerto Rico) Roberto Clemente Coliseum, Hato Rey	
63	Loss	47–14–2 (1)	(South Africa) Mike Schutte	TKO	7	January 26, 1976	(South Africa) City Hall, Durban, Kwa-Zulu Natal	
62	Loss	47–13–2 (1)	(South Africa) Mike Schutte	PTS	10	November 29, 1975	(South Africa) Rand Stadium, Johannesburg, Gauteng	
61	Loss	47–12–2 (1)	(United States) John "Dino" Denis	UD	10	September 30, 1975	(United States) Providence Civic Center, Providence, Rhode Island	
60	Loss	47–11–2 (1)	(Trinidad and Tobago) Wendell Joseph	UD	10	August 29, 1975	(United States Virgin Islands) Saint Thomas, U.S. Virgin Islands	
59	Win	47–10–2 (1)	(United States) Walter White	SD	11	March 7, 1975	(United States) Curtis Hixon Hall, Tampa, Florida	
58	Loss	46–10–2 (1)	(United States) Mike Quarry	UD	10	January 3, 1975	(United States) Fort Homer W. Hesterly Armory, Tampa, Florida	
57	Win	46–9–2 (1)	Earl Perrer	KO	6	October 10, 1974	(United States Virgin Islands) Saint Thomas, U.S. Virgin Islands	
56	NC	45–9–2 (1)	(United States) Eddie Owens	NC	9	August 12, 1974	Roberto Clemente Coliseum, San Juan, Puerto Rico	
55	Win	45–9–2	(Venezuela) Vicente Rondon	TKO	2	June 6, 1974	(United States) Curtis Hixon Hall, Tampa, Florida	
54	Draw	44–9–2	(Spain) Jose Manuel Urtain	PTS	8	March 1, 1974	(Spain) Madrid, Community of Madrid	
53	Loss	44–9–1	(Puerto Rico) Pedro Agosto	PTS	12	December 17, 1973	Roberto Clemente Coliseum, San Juan, Puerto Rico	For Puerto Rico Heavyweight Title
52	Loss	44–8–1	(United States) George Foreman	KO	1	September 1, 1973	(Japan) Nihon Budokan, Tokyo	For WBC and WBA World Heavyweight Titles
51	Win	44–7–1	(United States) Clyde Brown	KO	3	June 28, 1973	(United States) Portland, Maine	
50	Win	43–7–1	(United States) Terry Daniels	UD	10	November 21, 1972	(United States) Sahara Tahoe, Stateline, Nevada	
49	Win	42–7–1	(United States) Tony Ventura	TKO	2	October 2, 1972	Estadio Sixto Escobar, San Juan, Puerto Rico	
48	Win	41–7–1	(United States) Charley Polite	KO	1	July 14, 1972	Ponce, Puerto Rico	
47	Win	40–7–1	(Spain) Jose Manuel Urtain	UD	10	April 3, 1972	Hiram Bithorn Stadium, San Juan, Puerto Rico	
46	Win	39–7–1	(United States) Brian O'Melia	PTS	10	February 14, 1972	Hiram Bithorn Stadium, San Juan, Puerto Rico	
45	Loss	38–7–1	(United States) Robie Harris	SD	10	October 29, 1971	(United States) Anaheim Convention Center, Anaheim, California	
44	Win	37–6–1	(Venezuela) Jose Rondon	PTS	10	May 1, 1971	San Juan, Puerto Rico	
43	Win	36–6–1	(United States) Tommy Sheehan	KO	5	February 25, 1971	San Juan, Puerto Rico	
42	Win	35–6–1	(Venezuela) Jose Rondon	UD	10	February 1, 1971	(United States) Fort Homer W. Hesterly Armory, Tampa, Florida	
41	Win	34–6–1	(Mexico) Manuel Ramos	PTS	10	October 26, 1970	San Juan, Puerto Rico	
40	Win	33–6–1	(United States) Bill Hardney	KO	3	August 24, 1970	(United States) Fort Homer W. Hesterly Armory, Tampa, Florida	
39	Win	32–6–1	(United States) Tommy Howard	KO	7	July 27, 1970	(United States) Fort Homer W. Hesterly Armory, Tampa, Florida	
38	Win	31–6–1	(United States) Jack O'Halloran	PTS	10	May 25, 1970	(United States) Tampa, Florida	
37	Win	30–6–1	(United States) Moses Harrell	KO	2	April 20, 1970	(United States) Fort Homer W. Hesterly Armory, Tampa, Florida	
36	Win	29–6–1	(United States) Tommy Grant	TKO	1	April 7, 1970	(United States) Municipal Auditorium, San Antonio, Texas	
35	Win	28–6–1	(United States) Abe Brown	TKO	2	March 31, 1970	(United States) Sam Houston Coliseum, Houston, Texas	
34	Win	27–6–1	(United States) Tommy Howard	PTS	10	March 18, 1970	(United States) Citrus Bowl, Orlando, Florida	
33	Win	26–6–1	(United States) Mike Bruce	PTS	10	January 20, 1970	San Juan, Puerto Rico	
32	Win	25–6–1	(United States) George Holden	TKO	4	December 4, 1969	(United States) Fort Homer W. Hesterly Armory, Tampa, Florida	
31	Win	24–6–1	(United States) Charles Clark	KO	3	November 18, 1969	(United States) Sam Houston Coliseum, Houston, Texas	
30	Win	23–6–1	(United States) Abe Brown	KO	2	November 13, 1969	(United States) Fort Homer W. Hesterly Armory, Tampa, Florida	
29	Win	22–6–1	(United States) Bowie Adams	TKO	3	October 3, 1969	Estadio Country Club, San Juan, Puerto Rico	
28	Loss	21–6–1	(United Kingdom) Jack Bodell	PTS	10	July 14, 1969	(United Kingdom) Nottingham Ice Stadium, Nottingham, Nottinghamshire	49.25-49.75.
27	Win	21–5–1	(United States) Chuck Wepner	PTS	10	June 22, 1969	Hiram Bithorn Stadium, San Juan, Puerto Rico	
26	Win	20–5–1	(United States) Al Banks	PTS	10	April 19, 1969	San Juan, Puerto Rico	
25	Win	19–5–1	(United States) Jack O'Halloran	PTS	10	March 15, 1969	San Juan, Puerto Rico	
24	Win	18–5–1	(United States) Al Singletary	KO	10	February 13, 1969	San Juan, Puerto Rico	
23	Loss	17–5–1	(Puerto Rico) Pedro Agosto	KO	12	November 19, 1968	San Juan, Puerto Rico	
22	Loss	17–4–1	(United States) Charlie Harris	KO	8	May 20, 1968	(United States) Audubon Ballroom, New York City	
21	Win	17–3–1	(United States) Al Singletary	PTS	10	April 15, 1968	(United States) Audubon Ballroom, New York City	
20	Win	16–3–1	(United States) Charley Polite	UD	8	March 23, 1968	(United States) Boston Arena, Boston, Massachusetts	
19	Loss	15–3–1	(United States) Al Singletary	KO	7	October 2, 1967	(United States) Audubon Ballroom, New York City	
18	Win	15–2–1	(United States) James J. Johnson	PTS	8	August 21, 1967	(United States) Audubon Ballroom, New York City	
17	Draw	14–2–1	(United States) Moses Harrell	PTS	8	July 20, 1967	(United States) Portland Exposition Building, Portland, Maine	
16	Loss	14–2	(United States) Herman Harris	TKO	10	June 5, 1967	(United States) Worcester, Massachusetts	
15	Loss	14–1	(United States) Hal Carroll	SD	8	April 24, 1967	(United States) Mechanics Hall, Worcester, Massachusetts	
14	Win	14–0	(United States) James J. Johnson	UD	8	March 27, 1967	(United States) Mechanics Hall, Worcester, Massachusetts	
13	Win	13–0	(United States) Don Waldheim	SD	4	March 22, 1967	(United States) Madison Square Garden, New York City	
12	Win	12–0	(United States) Al Brooks	UD	6	March 13, 1967	(United States) Mechanics Hall, Worcester, Massachusetts	
11	Win	11–0	(United States) Billy Muse	PTS	6	March 2, 1967	(United States) Portland Exposition Building, Portland, Maine	
10	Win	10–0	(United States) Tony Burwell	PTS	8	January 16, 1967	(United States) Worcester, Massachusetts	
9	Win	9–0	(United Kingdom) Joe Webb	KO	2	January 9, 1967	(United States) Mechanics Hall, Worcester, Massachusetts	
8	Win	8–0	(United States) Abe Walden	PTS	6	December 19, 1966	(United States) Worcester, Massachusetts	
7	Win	7–0	(Puerto Rico) Felix Viera	TKO	2	December 16, 1966	(United States) Madison Square Garden, New York City	
6	Win	6–0	(United States) Abe Walden	TKO	5	October 24, 1966	(United States) Mechanics Hall, Worcester, Massachusetts	
5	Win	5–0	Bill Haderman	KO	5	October 20, 1966	(United States) Portland Exposition Building, Portland, Maine	
4	Win	4–0	George Ford	KO	2	October 17, 1966	(United States) Mechanics Hall, Worcester, Massachusetts	
3	Win	3–0	Wayne Webb	KO	2 (6)	September 8, 1966	(United States) Portland, Maine	
2	Win	2–0	John Hitts	KO	1 (4)	August 4, 1966	(United States) Portland Exposition Building, Portland, Maine	
1	Win	1–0	(United States) Sam Sellers	PTS	4	June 20, 1966	(United States) Pittsburgh Civic Arena, Pittsburgh, Pennsylvania	

== Personal ==
He has a daughter, Selina, who is an artist. There is a mural in Tampa Bay that depicts him and dr. Ferdie Pacheco, a well-known television boxing pundit.

== See also ==
- List of Puerto Ricans
- Sports in Puerto Rico
- Boxing in Puerto Rico
