= Boone Kirkman =

American boxer

Personal information
- Nickname: "Boone" "Boom Boom"
- Born: Daniel Victor Kirkman; February 6, 1945 (age 81) Vallejo, California, U.S.
- Height: 6 ft 1 in (185 cm)
- Weight: 210 lb (95 kg)

Boxing career
- Weight class: Heavyweight
- Stance: Orthodox

Boxing record
- Wins: 36
- Win by KO: 25
- Losses: 6

Daniel Victor "Boone" Kirkman (born February 6, 1945) is an American former professional heavyweight boxer. He was a Contender throughout his career and scored notable victories over Heavyweight World Champion Jimmy Ellis, as well as Top Contenders and Heavyweight Title Challengers Eddie Machen, Doug Jones, José Roman and Ron Stander. He also had fights against all-time greats such as Two-Time Heavyweight Champion George Foreman, World Heavyweight Champion Ken Norton, and World Heavyweight Title Challenger Ron Lyle, who was known for his brutal knockout power. He compiled a record of 36–6 with 26 knockouts.

Kirkman spent his entire career based in Seattle, Washington.

== Early life ==
Kirkman was born in Vallejo, California in 1945 to Oehm and Margarite Kirkman. His father, a naval officer, was stationed there at the time. When his father was discharged from the Navy, the family moved back to Renton, Washington, where Kirkman's grandfather initially settled.

From a young age, Kirkman's favorite activities were hunting, fishing, and hiking throughout the state of Washington with his father. He frequently stopped to view plant and animal life, earning him his lifelong nickname of "Boone". Growing up in Renton, a working-class community, Kirkman joined a group of 20 teenagers called the "Buds" that regularly drank alcohol and smoked. Considering the rampant street crime in the area, this was only of moderate concern to Kirkman's father. During this time, Kirkman became interested in boxing during regular sparring sessions with his older brother Steve.

Noting Kirkman's lack of interest in reading, a school friend recommended Rocky Graziano's autobiography Somebody Up There Likes Me, which was adapted into a film starring Paul Newman a year later. Kirkman's fondness of both the book and the film catalyzed him to pursue boxing at a serious level.

Kirkman's first training sessions at age 14 involved traveling to a south Seattle gymnasium to work out from his school in Renton. The venue was suggested to him by former professional Joey Velez. Kirkman took a year-long hiatus from boxing due to injury, but returned to the gym and won several local Golden Gloves events afterward, slowly building a reputation.

His popularity exploded in March 1965 when he won the AAU Heavyweight Boxing national title in Toledo, Ohio. Following the event, he was signed by Seattle-area fight manager Jack Hurley. Kirkman assumed co-ownership of his family's pub; The Melrose Tavern, shortly after his signing. Between bar tending shifts, Kirkman incorporated training, and spent most nights punching a speed bag, entertaining spectators.

== Professional career ==
Boone Kirkman's professional career lasted from 1966 to 1978. He finished with a record of 36–6, with a 60 knockout percentage and a peak ranking of seventh.

His first match, held in Boise, ended in a knockout over Lou Phillips. Kirkman managed to go undefeated in his first eleven matches, including a win over the dangerous but erratic Eddie Machen, until being stopped by the skilled Doug Jones in a featured fight held in Seattle. Jones opened a cut over Kirkman's left eye in the first round, but Kirkman managed to keep the veteran at bay until worsening damage to the wound caused the ring physician to stop the fight.

Six weeks later Kirkman avenged the defeat and began a 10-bout winning streak. Feeling confident, Hurley scheduled a match between Kirkman and recent Olympic heavyweight champion and two-year professional George Foreman at the Madison Square Garden.

=== Kirkman-Foreman (1970) ===
The Foreman fight was scheduled for November 18, 1970. Foreman was the most heavily favored opponent Kirkman would ever face.

From the start, Kirkman was overmatched by Foreman's superior quickness and power. Foreman pummeled Kirkman with a combination of powerful punches, knocking him to the canvas three times in the first two rounds. The bout ended in a technical knockout after just three minutes and forty seconds, when Kirkman failed to answer the bell.

Following the fight, Kirkman elected to opt-out of his contract with Hurley.

=== Post-Foreman (1970-1973) ===
Following the fight with Foreman, Kirkman won yet another 10 consecutive bouts, half by knockout. One of his more notable victories during this stretch came against Jack O'Halloran via points. He also encountered his second opponent ranked (at one time in their career) in the Ring Magazine Top 10 in by then over-the-hill ex-ununified heavyweight champion Jimmy Ellis, whom he defeated by split decision.

=== Later struggles (1974) ===
On April 9, 1974, Kirkman fought Memphis "Al" Jones in what Kirkman considered a "tune-up fight". The fight was stopped abruptly when Kirkman, having knocked Jones down four times in the first two rounds, was knocked unconscious by a right hook from Jones. This was Kirkman's first loss in over three and a half years.

Following the loss, Kirkman immediately scheduled several ranked opponents in an attempt to recover his sinking ranking. As a result, Kirkman experienced consecutive losses for the first time in his career after losing to Ken Norton, on his return to Seattle in June 1974. Norton was known as "the guy that broke Ali's jaw", doing it the previous year as a 7-1 underdog. The Kirkman-Norton fight was stopped by the referee when Kirkman failed to answer the bell for the eighth round.

In September, Kirkman fought Ron Lyle (who suffered a narrow defeat to Ali the following year for the WBA and WBC titles), but lost again when the referee stopped the fight due to a cut on Kirkman's cheek.

=== Relationship with Jack Hurley ===
Kirkman and Jack Hurley were often at odds during Hurley's tenure. In interviews, Kirkman has expressed several criticisms of his former manager, including uncooperative behavior, leaving his boxers unprepared for fights, and a failure to secure a fight with Muhammad Ali during his prime (when Kirkman was the seventh-ranked boxer in the world). Additionally, Hurley was not heavily involved during the training process, which contributed to poor scheduling.

Two other former boxers who were signed to Hurley, Harry Matthews and Pete Radarmacher, experienced similar frustrations, often finding themselves overmatched when up against highly ranked opponents.

== Professional boxing record ==
36 Wins (24 knockouts, 12 decisions), 6 Losses (3 knockouts, 2 decisions), 0 Draws
Result	Record	Opponent	Type	Date	Location
Win	36-6	(United States) Charles Atlas	TKO	Jan 26, 1978	(United States) Seattle, Washington
Win	35-6	(Puerto Rico) Pedro Agosto	PTS	Oct 25, 1977	(United States) Seattle, Washington
Win	34-6	(United States) Ron Stander	TKO	Jul 19, 1977	(United States) Seattle, Washington
Win	33-6	(Puerto Rico) José Roman	UD	Apr 26, 1977	(United States) Seattle, Washington
Loss	32-6	(United States) Randy Neumann	UD	Sep 5, 1975	(United States) Las Vegas, Nevada
Loss	32-5	(United States) Ron Lyle	TKO	Sep 17, 1974	(United States) Seattle, Washington
Loss	32-4	(United States) Ken Norton	RTD	Jun 25, 1974	(United States) Seattle, Washington
Loss	32-3	(United States) Al Jones	KO	Apr 9, 1974	(United States) Dallas, Texas
Win	32-2	(Canada) Larry Renaud	TKO	Mar 6, 1974	(United States) Reno, Nevada
Win	31-2	(United States) Jimmy Ellis	SD	Dec 12, 1973	(United States) Seattle, Washington
Win	30-2	(United States) George Johnson	PTS	Oct 23, 1973	(United States) Seattle, Washington
Win	29-2	(United States) Lou Bailey	PTS	Oct 4, 1973	(United States) Denver, Colorado
Win	28-2	(United States) Robie Harris	KO	Sep 20, 1973	(United States) Stockton, California
Win	27-2	(United States) Jack O'Halloran	PTS	Jul 12, 1973	(United States) Seattle, Washington
Win	26-2	(United States) Steve Carter	PTS	May 16, 1973	(United States) Stockton, California
Win	25-2	(United States) Bill Drover	KO	Apr 28, 1973	(United States) Seattle, Washington
Win	24-2	(United States) Dick Gosha	TKO	Mar 15, 1973	(United States) Seattle, Washington
Win	23-2	(United States) Fred|Lewis	TKO	Jan 30, 1973	(United States) Seattle, Washington
Loss	22-2	(United States) George Foreman	TKO	Nov 18, 1970	(United States) Madison Square Garden, New York, New York
Win	22-1	(United States) Amos Lincoln	KO	Jul 9, 1970	(United States) Seattle, Washington
Win	21-1	(United States) Bill McMurray	TKO	Apr 28, 1970	(United States) Seattle, Washington
Win	20-1	(United States) Ollie Wilson	KO	Mar 17, 1970	(United States) St. Paul, Minnesota
Win	19-1	(United States) Mike Bruce	KO	Jan 26, 1970	(United States) Seattle, Washington
Win	18-1	(United States) Bill McMurray	UD	Sep 9, 1968	(United States) Seattle, Washington
Win	17-1	(United States) Everett Copeland	TKO	Apr 25, 1968	(United States) Spokane, Washington
Win	16-1	(United States) Mike Lanum	KO	Feb 29, 1968	(United States) St. Louis, Missouri
Win	15-1	(United States) Archie Ray	KO	Dec 12, 1967	(United States) St. Louis, Missouri
Win	14-1	(United States) Wayne Heath	KO	Nov 17, 1967	(United States) Spokane, Washington
Win	13-1	(United States) Bill Nielson	TKO	Oct 3, 1967	(United States) Portland, Oregon
Win	12-1	(United States) Doug Jones	TKO	Aug 10, 1967	(United States) Seattle, Washington
Loss	11-1	(United States) Doug Jones	TKO	Jun 29, 1967	(United States) Seattle, Washington
Win	11-0	(United States) Eddie Machen	TKO	May 26, 1967	(United States) Seattle, Washington
Win	10-0	(Sweden) Lars Olof Norling	TKO	Apr 22, 1967	(United States) Spokane, Washington
Win	9-0	(United States) Wayne Heath	UD	Mar 21, 1967	(United States) Portland, Oregon
Win	8-0	(United States) Leroy Birmingham	TKO	Feb 28, 1967	(United States) Spokane, Washington
Win	7-0	(United States) Bowie Adams	KO	Jan 24, 1967	(United States) Seattle, Washington
Win	6-0	(United States) Archie Ray	PTS	Oct 20, 1966	(United States) Boise, Idaho
Win	5-0	(United States) Archie Ray	UD	Sep 22, 1966	(United States) Boise, Idaho
Win	4-0	(United States) Al Carter	TKO	Jun 23, 1966	(United States) Los Angeles, California
Win	3-0	(United States) John Collins	TKO	Jun 2, 1966	(United States) Boise, Idaho
Win	2-0	(United States) Gail Wright	KO	May 5, 1966	(United States) Boise, Idaho
Win	1-0	(United States) Lou Phillips	KO	Apr 1, 1966	(United States) Boise, Idaho

== Exhibition boxing record ==
1 fight	0 wins	0 losses
Non-scored	1	

No.	Result	Record	Opponent	Type	Round, time	Date	Location	Notes
1	—N/a	0–0 (1)	(United States) George Foreman	—N/a	3	April 26, 1975	Maple Leaf Gardens, Toronto, Ontario, Canada	Non-scored bout

== Personal life ==
After retiring from boxing at age 33, Kirkman became a Boeing delivery truck driver. He retired from Boeing in 2010.

Kirkman lives near Renton with his wife Teese, a retired nurse. The two have been married since 1988. He has two children from a previous marriage, Erik and Nina. He also has two grandchildren.

In his spare time, Kirkman enjoys hiking and mountaineering. He has scaled four of the five highest peaks in Washington: Mount Rainier, Mount St. Helens, Mount Adams, and Mount Baker.
