= Donald Walheim =

American boxer

Donald Waldhelm (born March 17, 1939, in the Gerritsen Beach neighborhood of Brooklyn, New York) was a professional boxer. He competed as a heavyweight and is best known for being George Foreman's first professional opponent (he was knocked out in the third round).

He also won the light heavyweight Golden Gloves in 1964. He beat James Joyner on the three knockdown rule in amateur boxing.

After his retirement from professional boxing, Waldhelm trained several amateur fighters in and around Brooklyn for local, state, and national competitions including the Golden Gloves.
