= Duane Bobick =

American boxer (born 1950)

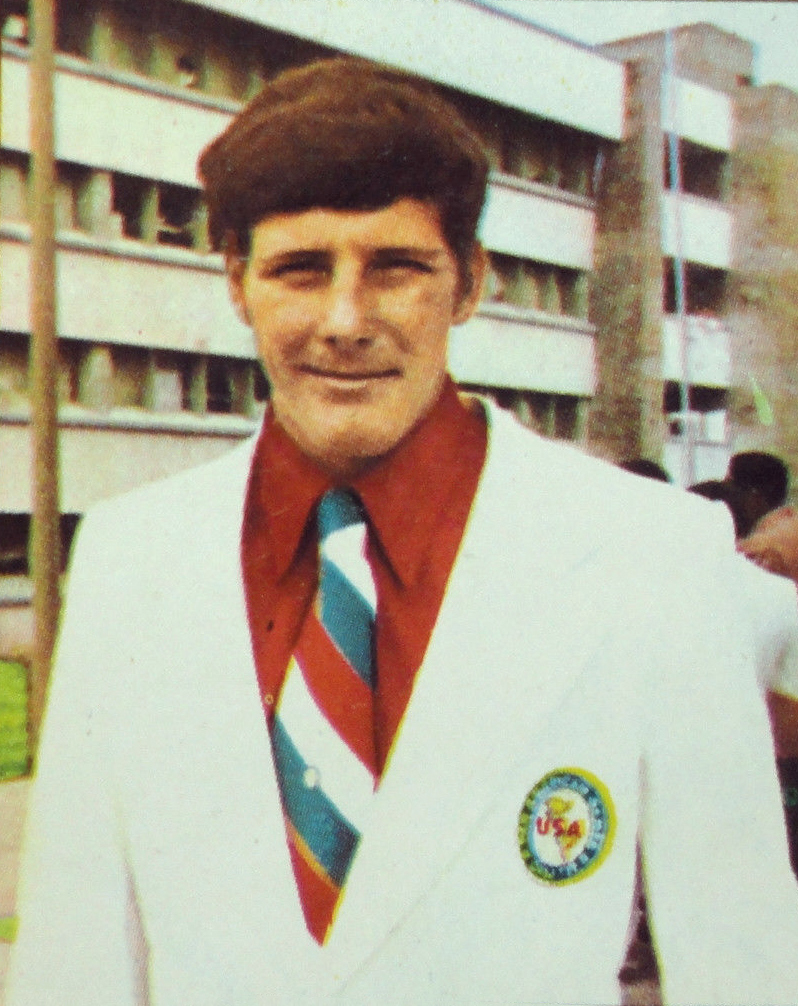
- Bobick at the 1972 Olympics

Personal information
- Born: Duane David Bobick; August 24, 1950 (age 76) Little Falls, Minnesota, U.S.
- Height: 190 cm (6 ft 3 in)
- Weight: 94 kg (207 lb)

Boxing career
- Weight class: Heavyweight
- Reach: 208 cm (82 in)
- Stance: Orthodox

Boxing record
- Total fights: 52
- Wins: 48
- Win by KO: 42
- Losses: 4
- Draws: 0
Medal record
Men's amateur boxing
Representing the United States
Pan American Games
Gold medal – first place	1971 Cali	+81 kg

Duane David Bobick (born August 24, 1950) is an American former boxer. As an amateur, Bobick won the gold medal at the 1971 Pan American Games and fought at the 1972 Olympics. He then turned professional in 1973 and retired in 1979 with a record of 48 wins (42 by knockout) and four losses, all by knockout. He scored notable wins over future heavyweight champion Mike Weaver and contenders Chuck Wepner, Scott LeDoux, Randy Neumann and Manuel Ramos. From 1973 to 1977, he compiled a record of 38–0 with 32 knockouts which made him the number 3 contender in the division before he was defeated by number 1 contender Ken Norton by a TKO in the first round after 58 seconds of fighting.

== Amateur career ==
Bobick was part of a boxing family and grew up with the sport in the 1960s. A good puncher who developed well early by virtue of countless hours in the gym and ring, Bobick had an outstanding amateur career that included a win over Teófilo Stevenson at the 1971 Pan American Games. Bobick added another future champion to his list when he beat Larry Holmes to be named to the 1972 U.S. Olympic boxing team. But lurking on Bobick's amateur record were two devastating second-round one-punch knockout losses at the hands of future heavyweight contender Ron Lyle. The first time, Lyle dispatched of him at the national AAU quarterfinals. The second time, fighting for a spot on the national team, Bobick was dropped with a straight right at 30 seconds of the second round, and was unconscious in the ring for over five minutes.

While being an amateur Bobick served as a quartermaster in the U.S. Navy. He was a three-time Navy Heavyweight Champion, two-time All-Service Heavyweight Champion and two-time International Military champion. He was touted as a rising star at this early stage, and may have been overconfident as he met Stevenson again at the 1972 Olympics. The fight was even after two rounds with Stevenson getting the edge in round one and Bobick rallying in round two. In the third round, Bobick fell victim to a nemesis that would bedevil him for the rest of his boxing career, the overhand right. Stunned, floored and eventually defenseless, Bobick was pounded by the Cuban champion until the bout was stopped; this was Bobick's last bout as an amateur. By that time he had a record of 93 wins (60 by KO) and 10 losses.

=== Highlights ===
(gold) All-Navy Championships, Mare Island, California, April 1971:

- Finals: Defeated Rick Harris KO 2 (1:50)

(gold) Inter-service Championships, Mare Island, California, April 1971:

- 1/2: Defeated Kenneth Hassan KO 1
- Finals: Defeated Louis Slaughter by decision

(gold) National Championships, New Orleans, Louisiana, April–May 1971:

- 1/16: Defeated William Anderson KO 2 (2:02)
- 1/8: Defeated Michael Weaver KO 1
- 1/4: Defeated Don Nelson KO 1
- 1/2: Defeated Fred Houpe KO 2
- Finals: Defeated Ronald Draper by decision

1971 Pan-American Games Heavyweight champion

1972 National Golden Gloves Heavyweight Champion

== Pro career ==
Bobick trained hard to start his pro career, which did not begin until the spring of 1973. He trained with and was managed by heavyweight legend Joe Frazier. Bobick's first match was against Tommy Burns. He sent Burns to the canvas four times on his way to a first-round KO. Bobick had 14 other fights in 1973, winning them all by KO, including a win over former contender Manuel Ramos. Bobick won his first 19 fights by knockout.

He had 10 more fights in 1974, winning them all again, eight by KO. Knockout wins that year included Ted Gullick and future champion Mike Weaver. He also decisioned veteran boxer Billy Daniels. With a 25–0 record and 23 KOs he was then rated as the sport's new "White Hope", taking that label from then-declining Jerry Quarry. Frazier himself was approaching retirement and focusing on upcoming paydays with protégé Bobick.

Bobick gained top-10 ranking in 1975 with eight more fights and wins, all again by KO. He was now being dodged by some, but a win over Randy Neumann proved he could not be ignored. He had a tentative contract with Muhammad Ali in 1976, but the fight never materialized. Instead he met and defeated lower ranked contender Larry Middleton, fellow Minnesotan Scott LeDoux, Bunny Johnson and veteran Chuck Wepner among his five 1976 fights, all wins with two KOs.

=== The Norton fight ===
Having a 38–0 record with 32 KOs he fought the future champion Ken Norton in a prime time network television bout in May 1977. Both fighters appeared tight and cautious from the opening bell. Norton suddenly connected with an unexpected overhand right flush onto Bobick's chin. He staggered wildly unable to clinch and avoid Norton's furious assault.

Norton trapped Bobick in a corner landing several roundhouse rights. One of the punches that connected was a right uppercut that caught Bobick in the throat. Staggered, blind from his tearing eyes as a result of the throat punch and walloped by another huge right hand, Bobick went to the canvas face first. He rose as the count reached ten. Bobick swayed on unsteady legs and the bout was stopped. The fight officially lasted just 58 seconds, but the actual length of the contest was about 70 seconds. Trainer Joe Frazier, who had previously sparred with Norton, apparently had advised Bobick not to take the fight.

=== Comeback ===
Despite the embarrassing defeat, Bobick was back in the ring two months later, winning a rematch with Scott LeDoux. He finished the year 1977 at 40–1 with 34 KOs.

In 1978, he was upset in the third round by South African Kallie Knoetze for his second KO loss, again falling victim to an overhand right. Cut over his right eye and floored, Bobick rose at the count of 8 but the fight was stopped. He fought eight more times against second-tier fighters in 1978, winning all by KO.

He was then looking to return to top-level contention in 1979 securing a nationally televised bout with future belt-holder and Stevenson's 1976 Olympic KO victim John Tate. Bobick talked openly pre-bout of his new commitment to training and conditioning, citing reduced body fat statistics as proof of his seriousness to return to the top of the heavyweight ranks. Hurt early in the first round by an overhand right as in the Norton fight, Bobick could not clinch to clear his head and continued to move forward absorbing terrible punishment. A knockdown followed by a dozen overhand rights from Tate forced the referee to stop the bout a little over two minutes into the first round. A TKO loss (stopped due to deep cuts on both eyelids) to prospect George Chaplin later that year led to his retirement at age 28.

== Professional boxing record ==
48 Wins (42 knockouts, 6 decisions), 4 Losses (4 knockouts, 0 decisions)
Result	Record	Opponent	Type	Round	Date	Location	Notes
Loss	48–4	(United States) George Chaplin	RTD	6	1979-07-03	Resorts Atlantic City, Atlantic City, New Jersey, U.S.	Bobick retired at 3:00 of the sixth round.
Loss	48–3	(United States) John Tate	KO	1	1979-02-17	Market Square Arena, Indianapolis, Indiana, U.S.	Bobick knocked out at 2:25 of the first round.
Win	48–2	(United States) Henry Patterson	KO	2	1978-12-23	Spartanburg Memorial Auditorium, Spartanburg, South Carolina, U.S.	
Win	47–2	(United States) Tom Nickson	TKO	3	1978-12-05	Jacksonville, Florida, U.S.	
Win	46–2	(United States) Terry Mims	TKO	7	1978-11-30	Indianapolis Convention Center, Indianapolis, Indiana, U.S.	Referee stopped the bout at 1:06 of the seventh round.
Win	45–2	(United States) Tom Prater	TKO	5	1978-10-31	Indianapolis, Indiana, U.S.	
Win	44–2	(United States) John Jordan	KO	1	1978-10-09	Hampton Coliseum, Hampton, Virginia, U.S.	
Win	43–2	(Mexico) Fernando Montes	KO	3	1978-08-30	Metropolitan Sports Center, Bloomington, Minnesota, U.S.	
Win	42–2	(United States) Jerry Thompkins	KO	2	1978-08-16	(New York (state)) Star Theatre, Nanuet, New York, U.S.	
Win	41–2	(South Africa) Mike Schutte	TKO	8	1978-03-20	Good Hope Centre, Cape Town, South Africa	
Loss	40–2	(South Africa) Kallie Knoetze	KO	3	1978-02-04	Rand Stadium, Johannesburg, South Africa	
Win	40–1	(Puerto Rico) Pedro Agosto	KO	3	1977-11-30	Newark, New Jersey, U.S.	Agosto knocked out at 2:03 of the third round.
Win	39–1	(United States) Scott LeDoux	TKO	8	1977-07-28	Metropolitan Sports Center, Bloomington, Minnesota, U.S.	Referee stopped the bout at 2:35 of the eighth round.
Loss	38–1	(United States) Ken Norton	TKO	1	1977-05-11	(New York (state)) Madison Square Garden, New York City, New York, U.S.	Referee stopped the bout at 0:58 of the first round.
Win	38–0	(United States) Fred Houpe	UD	10	1976-10-30	The Aladdin, Las Vegas, Nevada, U.S.	
Win	37–0	(United States) Chuck Wepner	TKO	6	1976-10-02	(New York (state)) Utica College Sports Complex, Utica, New York, U.S.	Referee stopped the bout at 1:12 of the sixth round.
Win	36–0	(Jamaica) Bunny Johnson	TKO	8	1976-05-24	Olympiahalle, Munich, West Germany	
Win	35–0	(United States) Scott LeDoux	UD	10	1976-04-22	Metropolitan Sports Center, Bloomington, Minnesota, U.S.	
Win	34–0	(United States) Larry Middleton	UD	10	1976-02-06	(New York (state)) Madison Square Garden, New York City, New York, U.S.	
Win	33–0	(United States) Randy Neumann	TKO	4	1975-12-12	(New York (state)) Madison Square Garden, New York City, New York, U.S.	Referee stopped the bout at 2:17 of the fourth round.
Win	32–0	(United States) George Johnson	RTD	4	1975-11-13	Metropolitan Sports Center, Bloomington, Minnesota, U.S.	
Win	31–0	(United States) Rochelle Norris	KO	2	1975-10-21	Philadelphia Spectrum, Philadelphia, Pennsylvania, U.S.	Norris knocked out at 2:59 of the second round.
Win	30–0	(United States) Pat Duncan	KO	8	1975-08-26	Largo Capitol Centre, Largo, Maryland, U.S.	
Win	29–0	(Jamaica) Oliver Wright	KO	3	1975-06-25	Metropolitan Sports Center, Bloomington, Minnesota, U.S.	
Win	28–0	(United States) Ernie Lassiter	TKO	2	1975-05-31	Waterbury Armory, Waterbury, Connecticut, U.S.	
Win	27–0	(Argentina) Reinaldo Raul Gorosito	UD	10	1975-04-23	Metropolitan Sports Center, Bloomington, Minnesota, U.S.	
Win	26–0	(United States) Roy Wallace	KO	2	1975-04-04	(New York (state)) Nassau Coliseum, Uniondale, New York, U.S.	Wallace knocked out at 1:25 of the second round.
Win	25–0	(United States) Harold Carter	TKO	2	1974-08-10	Fairmont, West Virginia, U.S.	
Win	24–0	(United States) Mike Weaver	TKO	7	1974-07-26	San Diego Coliseum, San Diego, California, U.S.	
Win	23–0	(United States) Donnie Nelson	TKO	1	1974-07-16	Denver, Colorado, U.S.	Referee stopped the bout at 2:52 of the first round.
Win	22–0	(United States) Art Robinson	KO	3	1974-06-22	Little Falls, Minnesota, U.S.	
Win	21–0	(United States) Lou Bailey	UD	10	1974-04-22	Norfolk, Virginia, U.S.	
Win	20–0	(United States) Billy Daniels	UD	10	1974-04-06	Huntington, West Virginia, U.S.	
Win	19–0	(United States) Ted Gullick	TKO	2	1974-03-20	Scranton, Pennsylvania, U.S.	Referee stopped the bout at 0:31 of the second round.
Win	18–0	(United States) Jimmy Cross	KO	3	1974-02-19	Oklahoma City, U.S.	
Win	17–0	(United States) Jimmy Summerville	TKO	2	1974-02-05	Miami Beach Auditorium, Miami Beach, Florida, U.S.	
Win	16–0	(United States) Orville Qualls	KO	2	1974-01-25	San Diego Coliseum, San Diego, California, U.S.	
Win	15–0	(United States) Rico Brooks	KO	2	1973-12-06	Omaha Civic Auditorium, Omaha, Nebraska, U.S.	Brooks knocked out at 2:19 of the second round.
Win	14–0	(United States) John Hudgins	TKO	2	1973-11-24	Roanoke Civic Center, Roanoke, Virginia, U.S.	
Win	13–0	(United States) Roger Russell	KO	5	1973-10-30	Wilkes-Barre, Pennsylvania, U.S.	
Win	12–0	(United States) Orvin Veazey	KO	2	1973-10-16	Columbia Music Hall, West Hartford, Connecticut, U.S.	
Win	11–0	(United States) Ron Draper	KO	4	1973-09-25	Kansas City, Missouri, U.S.	Draper knocked out at 1:46 of the fourth round.
Win	10–0	(Mexico) Manuel Ramos	TKO	7	1973-09-15	Norfolk Scope, Norfolk, Virginia, U.S.	
Win	9–0	(United States) GG Maldonado	KO	2	1973-08-22	Minneapolis Auditorium, Minneapolis, Minnesota, U.S.	
Win	8–0	(Canada) Leslie Borden	TKO	3	1973-08-15	Denver, Colorado, U.S.	
Win	7–0	(United States) Ned Edwards	KO	3	1973-08-08	(New York (state)) Binghamton Veterans Memorial Auditorium, Binghamton, New York, U.S.	
Win	6–0	(United States) Sylvester Murphy	KO	1	1973-07-06	Bristol International Raceway, Bristol, Tennessee, U.S.	
Win	5–0	(United States) Doug Kirk	TKO	2	1973-06-15	Halenbeck Hall, Saint Cloud, Minnesota, U.S.	Referee stopped the bout at 1:16 of the second round.
Win	4–0	(United States) Clyde Brown	TKO	2	1973-05-31	Frankfort, Kentucky, U.S.	Referee stopped the bout at 0:45 of the second round.
Win	3–0	Jim Williams	KO	5	1973-05-12	Denver Coliseum, Denver, Colorado, U.S.	
Win	2–0	(United States) Willie Anderson	TKO	3	1973-04-21	Capitol Plaza, Louisville, Kentucky, U.S.	
Win	1–0	(Canada) Tommy Burns	KO	1	1973-04-10	Minneapolis, Minnesota, U.S.	Burns knocked out at 2:59 of the first round.

== Life after boxing ==
Bobick returned to Minnesota and took heavy industry work before a machine accident nearly killed him in 1997. Both his arms were caught and crushed between huge paper rolls being rotated in a paper mill. He narrowly avoided amputation after a complex surgery to re-attach muscles and tendons and repair skin and bone damage. After this, he went into coaching and public speaking, using his celebrity to try to encourage and help others. In November 2006, he was elected as a city councilman.

On June 19, 2014, Bobick was inducted into the National Polish-American Sports Hall of Fame in Troy, Michigan.

== Personal life ==
Bobick's younger brother Rodney Bobick was also a heavyweight boxer. He died in a single car crash in 1977.

After his retirement, Bobick worked as a travel agent in Ventnor, New Jersey. He suffers from chronic traumatic encephalopathy (also known as dementia pugilistica). Originally diagnosed in 1997 after his arm injury, his progressive decline has been noteworthy in recent years. He was quoted in 2011 by the Morrison County Record saying "I'm not sure I would have gone into boxing back then if I would have known all the effects of head trauma that I know today, but I don't regret the experience, intense training and discipline I learned from the sport."

Preceded by Ron Lyle	United States Amateur Heavyweight Champion; 1971	Succeeded by Nick Wells
