= Muhammad Ali vs. Ron Lyle =

Boxing competition

- Date: May 16, 1975
- Venue: Las Vegas Convention Centre, Las Vegas, Nevada
- Title(s) on the line: WBA, WBC and The Ring undisputed heavyweight championship

Tale of the tape
Boxer	(United States) Muhammad Ali	(United States) Ron Lyle
Nickname	"The Greatest"	
Hometown	Louisville, Kentucky	Dayton, Ohio
Pre-fight record	46–2 (33 KO)	30–2–1 (21 KO)
Age	33 years, 3 months	34 years, 3 months
Height	6 ft 3 in (191 cm)	6 ft 3 1/2 in (192 cm)
Weight	224 1/2 lb (102 kg)	219 lb (99 kg)
Style	Orthodox	Orthodox
Recognition	WBA, WBC and The Ring undisputed Heavyweight Champion	WBA/WBC; No. 3 Ranked Heavyweight

Result
- Ali won via 11th round TKO (1:08)

Muhammad Ali vs. Ron Lyle was a professional boxing match contested on May 16, 1975, for the undisputed heavyweight championship.

== Background ==
Lyle was offered the opportunity to compete for the title despite his loss to the then little-known Jimmy Young two months earlier at Honolulu, Hawaii.

This bout was aired live primetime in the United States via ABC with Howard Cosell doing the play-by-play and it took place in Las Vegas, Nevada.

== The fight ==
Ali entered the bout at 224.5 pounds, the heaviest he had ever been at that point in his career. Lyle, at 219 pounds, was also at the heaviest weight of his career.

Ali had forecast that the bout would be a "treat for the people", but in many of the rounds he preferred to defend and absorb Lyle's sharp punches. The challenger had been exhorted by a chant of "Lyle, Lyle" from several Denver followers, and in the opening round he bloodied Ali's nose, although the bleeding abated.

Ali was jarred sporadically by Lyle's punches, usually the right hand. In the fifth, the champion chose to dance, taunting Lyle with jabs but often being pinned against the ropes. In the sixth, he displayed the "Ali Shuffle", to the delight of the crowd, and to the temporary confusion of the stiff-moving challenger.

As the ring girl from the Tropicana Hotel in Las Vegas strutted past Ali with a big card signaling the start of the eighth round, Ali stared, aware that this was the round in which he had predicted he would knock Lyle out. From his flatfooted stance, he tried for the knockout, but Lyle cornered and fought him off, particularly with a jarring right hand.

For the next two rounds, Ali took his time, boxing defensively and retreating to the ropes while accepting Lyle's punches. But Ali stunned Lyle with a right hand early in the 11th round, and pounced on the challenger with a flurry of punches, driving the 33-year old challenger across the ring to make the judges scorecards academic (Ali was behind on 2 of the 3 scorecards heading into this round as Judge Bill Kipp had Lyle ahead 49–43 on a 5-point must system, while Art Lurie had Lyle ahead 46–45, and Bill Mangiaracina had it 46–46). Lyle was defenseless against the champion's onslaught, and Ali signaled Referee Ferd Hernandez to stop the fight, but Hernandez waited another nine brutal seconds before awarding Ali a technical knockout at 1:08 in the 11th round. Lyle protested briefly, then staggered to his corner in a daze.

== Aftermath ==
Lyle's corner was not happy with the referee's decision to stop the bout.

== Undercard ==
Confirmed bouts:

Winner	Loser	Weight division/title belt(s) disputed	Result
(Argentina) Víctor Galíndez	(United States) Ray Elson	Light Heavyweight (12 rounds)	8th-round TKO.
(United States) Larry Holmes	(United States) Ernie Smith	Heavyweight (8 rounds)	3rd-round RTD.
(United States) Fred Houpe	(United States) John L Johnson	Heavyweight (4 rounds)	4th-round TKO.

== Broadcasting ==
Country	Broadcaster
Mexico	Televisa
Philippines	KBS 9
United Kingdom	BBC
United States	ABC

Preceded by vs. Chuck Wepner	Muhammad Ali's bouts 16 May 1975	Succeeded by vs. Joe Bugner II
Preceded by vs. Jimmy Young	Ron Lyle's bouts 16 May 1975	Succeeded by vs. Earnie Shavers
