= Ron Stander =

American boxer (1944–2022)

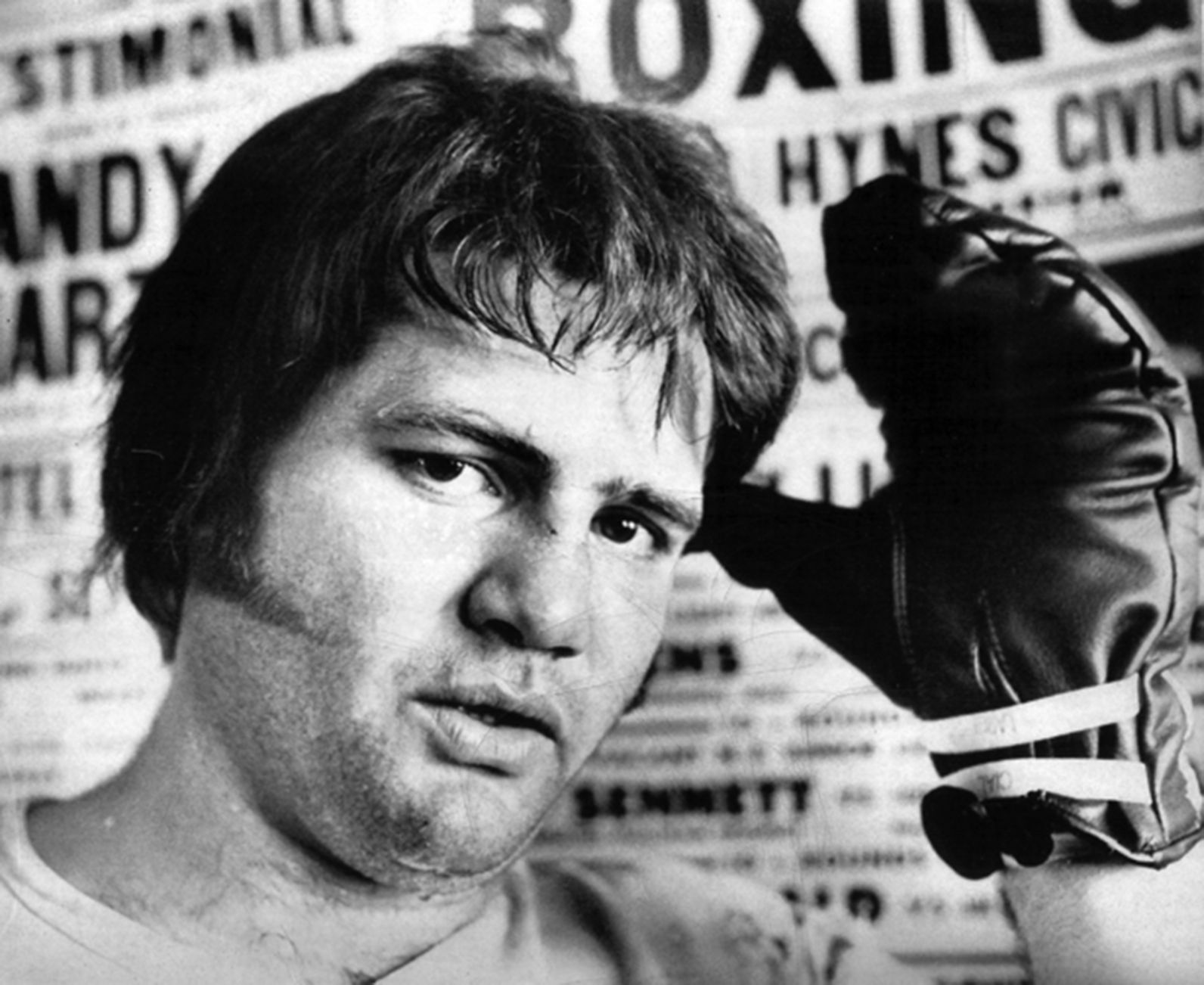
- Stander in 1972

Personal information
- Nickname: The Council Bluffs Butcher
- Nationality: American
- Born: Ronald Stander; October 17, 1944 Columbia, South Carolina, U.S.
- Died: March 8, 2022 (aged 77)
- Height: 5 ft 11 in (1.80 m)
- Weight: Heavyweight

Boxing career
- Reach: 70 in (178 cm)
- Stance: Orthodox

Boxing record
- Total fights: 61
- Wins: 37
- Win by KO: 28
- Losses: 21
- Draws: 3

Ron Stander (October 17, 1944 – March 8, 2022) was an American professional boxer, who fought from 1969 to 1982. The highlight of Stander's pro career came on May 25, 1972 when he challenged for the world heavyweight championship in Omaha, Nebraska. Stander lost to champion Joe Frazier by fifth-round technical knockout when the ring doctor stopped the fight after the fourth round. Prior to his unsuccessful match versus Frazier, Stander had scored a fifth-round knockout victory over hard-punching Earnie Shavers in 1970, and a decision win over contender Thad Spencer in 1971. An award-winning documentary titled "The Bluffs Butcher," after his adopted hometown of Council Bluffs, Iowa, produced by journalism student Andrew Batt, was released in 2004. The documentary tells the story of Iowa's arguably best shot at a World Heavyweight Boxing Title and chronicled Stander's journey from virtual unknown to boxing's largest stage.

== Frazier-Stander Fight ==
Stander was largely an unknown commodity when he was given the opportunity to fight for the world heavyweight title in Omaha. The fight prompted Stander's then wife Darlene Stander, to famously compare it to putting a Volkswagen to compete at the Indianapolis 500 race, when she said "You don't take a Volkswagen into the Indy 500, unless you know of a hell of a shortcut". It marked the first time a world heavyweight title fight had been held in Nebraska. Stander had a solid 23-1-1 record entering the bout and was clearly the fans' favorite based on the huge, enthusiastic ovation he received when he was introduced. Frazier was the undefeated champion and entered the ring as a 10-1 betting favorite. He was booed after being introduced. Both men employed the same aggressive fighting style of pushing forward and fighting at close quarters, which made for an exciting contest. Stander was quite competitive in the first round, even buckling Frazier's knees with one blow late in the round. However, by the second round, Frazier's superiority in class began to show and the champion was getting the better of the frequent exchanges. In the third round Frazier opened a cut on the bridge of Stander's nose and severely staggered him late in the round. Stander was not knocked down, however. By the fourth round Stander was bleeding profusely from the cut and again was badly staggered towards the end of the round as Frazier landed numerous telling blows to Stander's face. Between rounds four and five the fight was stopped by veteran referee Zack Clayton on the advice of the ring doctor. Officially Frazier was credited with a victory by a fifth-round technical knockout.

== Personal life and death ==
Stander died from complications of diabetes on March 8, 2022, at the age of 77.

== Professional boxing record ==
38 Wins (29 knockouts, 9 decisions), 21 Losses (9 knockouts, 12 decisions), 3 Draws
Result	Record	Opponent	Type	Round	Date	Location	Notes
Loss	38–21–3	(United States) Otis Bates	PTS	10	July 6, 1982	(United States) Little Rock, Arkansas, U.S.	
Loss	38–20–3	(United States) Les Myers	TKO	6	October 24, 1981	(United States) Dodge City, Kansas, U.S.	
Loss	38–19–3	(United States) Jeff May	UD	4	June 25, 1981	(United States) Milwaukee, Wisconsin, U.S.	
Draw	38–18–3	(United States) Otis Bates	PTS	10	July 27, 1980	(United States) Omaha, Nebraska, U.S.	
Loss	38–18–2	(United States) Jeff Shelburg	PTS	10	May 24, 1980	(United States) Salt Lake City, Utah, U.S.	
Loss	38–17–2	(United States) James Tillis	TKO	7	March 3, 1980	(United States) Chicago, Illinois, U.S.	
Loss	38–16–2	(United States) Scott Frank	TKO	1	January 8, 1980	(United States) Totowa, New Jersey, U.S.	
Loss	38–15–2	(United States) Tom Fischer	PTS	10	August 24, 1979	(United States) Cincinnati, Ohio, U.S.	
Win	38–14–2	(United States) Jim Pearish	TKO	5	August 16, 1979	(United States) North Platte, Nebraska, U.S.	
Loss	37–14–2	(United States) James Dixon	UD	12	June 25, 1979	(United States) Omaha, Nebraska, U.S.	Midlands Heavyweight Title.
Loss	37–13–2	(United States) James Dixon	UD	10	April 28, 1979	(United States) Omaha, Nebraska, U.S.	
Win	37–12–2	(United States) Rick Howe	TKO	5	April 3, 1979	(United States) Marshalltown, Iowa, U.S.	
Win	36–12–2	(United States) Charles Atlas	KO	1	November 29, 1978	(United States) Council Bluffs, Iowa, U.S.	
Win	35–12–2	(United States) Charley Polite	UD	10	October 25, 1978	(United States) Omaha, Nebraska, U.S.	
Win	34–12–2	(United States) Bill Jackson	KO	1	July 26, 1978	(United States) Omaha, Nebraska, U.S.	
Win	33–12–2	(United States) Jesus Montes	KO	3	June 20, 1978	(United States) Little Rock, Arkansas, U.S.	
Win	32–12–2	(United States) Clyde Mudgett	TKO	4	March 23, 1978	(United States) Omaha, Nebraska, U.S.	
Loss	31–12–2	(United States) Horace Robinson	KO	5	November 30, 1977	(United States) White Plains, New York, U.S.	
Win	31–11–2	(United States) Raul Hernandez	KO	4	November 15, 1977	(United States) Oklahoma City, Oklahoma, U.S.	
Loss	30–11–2	(United States) Boone Kirkman	TKO	7	July 19, 1977	(United States) Seattle, Washington, U.S.	
Loss	30–10–2	(South Africa) Gerrie Coetzee	KO	8	July 17, 1976	Johannesburg, South Africa	
Win	30–9–2	(United States) Beau Williford	KO	3	June 1, 1976	(United States) Oklahoma City, Oklahoma, U.S.	
Loss	29–9–2	(United States) Ken Norton	TKO	5	April 30, 1976	(United States) Landover, Maryland, U.S.	
Win	29–8–2	(United States) Jesus Montes	KO	3	January 26, 1976	(United States) Little Rock, Arkansas, U.S.	
Win	28–8–2	(United States) Willie Jackson	KO	1	January 6, 1976	(United States) Oklahoma City, Oklahoma, U.S.	
Loss	27–8–2	(United States) Scott LeDoux	UD	10	December 10, 1975	(United States) Bloomington, Minnesota, U.S.	
Win	27–7–2	(United States) Terry Daniels	TKO	1	November 20, 1975	(United States) Omaha, Nebraska, U.S.	
Win	26–7–2	(United States) Morris Jackson	TKO	2	September 4, 1975	(United States) Omaha, Nebraska, U.S.	Iowa/Nebraska Heavyweight Titles. Referee stopped the bout at 0:58 of the second round.
Win	25–7–2	(United States) Bruce Scott	TKO	2	August 5, 1975	(United States) Oklahoma City, Oklahoma, U.S.	
Loss	24–7–2	(United States) Fred Askew	UD	10	May 7, 1975	(United States) Minneapolis, Minnesota, U.S.	
Loss	24–6–2	(United States) Rodney Bobick	UD	10	July 31, 1974	(United States) Bloomington, Minnesota, U.S.	
Draw	24–5–2	(United States) Morris Jackson	PTS	10	March 22, 1974	(United States) Omaha, Nebraska, U.S.	
Loss	24–5–1	(United States) Charlie James	PTS	10	February 19, 1974	(United States) Honolulu, Hawaii, U.S.	Hawaii Heavyweight Title.
Loss	24–4–1	(United States) Jeff Merritt	TKO	3	November 28, 1973	(United States) Cleveland, Ohio, U.S.	
Win	24–3–1	(United States) Walker Smith	TKO	3	September 10, 1973	(United States) Providence, Rhode Island, U.S.	
Loss	23–3–1	(United States) John Jordan	UD	10	March 29, 1973	(United States) Portland, Maine, U.S.	
Loss	23–2–1	(United States) Joe Frazier	RTD	5	May 25, 1972	(United States) Omaha, Nebraska, U.S.	WBC/WBA Heavyweight Titles.
Win	23–1–1	(United States) Johnny Mac	UD	10	March 20, 1972	(United States) Council Bluffs, Iowa, U.S.	
Win	22–1–1	(United States) Mike Boswell	UD	10	February 14, 1972	(United States) Omaha, Nebraska, U.S.	
Loss	21–1–1	(United States) Rico Brooks	SD	10	January 22, 1972	(United States) Denver, Colorado, U.S.	
Win	21–0–1	(United States) Clyde Brown	TKO	3	December 20, 1971	(United States) Elgin, Illinois, U.S.	
Win	20–0–1	(United States) Jesse Crown	KO	3	October 26, 1971	(United States) Omaha, Nebraska, U.S.	
Win	19–0–1	(Mexico) Manuel Ramos	UD	10	August 26, 1971	(United States) Omaha, Nebraska, U.S.	
Win	18–0–1	(United States) Jack O'Halloran	UD	10	July 29, 1971	(United States) Omaha, Nebraska, U.S.	
Win	17–0–1	(United States) Lee Carr	KO	6	May 24, 1971	(United States) Omaha, Nebraska, U.S.	
Win	16–0–1	(United States) Thad Spencer	UD	10	April 23, 1971	(United States) Omaha, Nebraska, U.S.	
Win	15–0–1	(Canada) Frank Bullard	KO	6	March 30, 1971	(United States) Omaha, Nebraska, U.S.	
Win	14–0–1	(United States) Joe Murphy Goodwin	KO	1	November 3, 1970	(United States) Oklahoma City, Oklahoma, U.S.	
Draw	13–0–1	(Mexico) Manuel Ramos	PTS	10	September 17, 1970	(United States) Omaha, Nebraska, U.S.	
Win	13–0	(United States) Bill Hardney	KO	1	August 28, 1970	(United States) Omaha, Nebraska, U.S.	
Win	12–0	(United States) Ray Ellis	TKO	3	July 17, 1970	(United States) Omaha, Nebraska, U.S.	
Win	11–0	(United States) Eddie Dembry	UD	8	June 8, 1970	(United States) Omaha, Nebraska, U.S.	
Win	10–0	(United States) Earnie Shavers	KO	5	May 11, 1970	(United States) Omaha, Nebraska, U.S.	
Win	9–0	(United States) Woody Parks	TKO	1	April 9, 1970	(United States) Omaha, Nebraska, U.S.	
Win	8–0	(United States) Joe Harris	KO	4	March 23, 1970	(United States) Milwaukee, Wisconsin, U.S.	
Win	7–0	(United States) Lee Powell	KO	1	March 2, 1970	(United States) Omaha, Nebraska, U.S.	
Win	6–0	(United States) Roy Rodriguez	UD	6	January 29, 1970	(United States) Waterloo, Iowa, U.S.	
Win	5–0	(United States) Joe Byrd	PTS	6	December 19, 1969	(United States) Omaha, Nebraska, U.S.	
Win	4–0	(United States) Wilbert Elbert	KO	1	November 17, 1969	(United States) Omaha, Nebraska, U.S.	
Win	3–0	(United States) Lee Estes	TKO	2	September 29, 1969	(United States) Milwaukee, Wisconsin, U.S.	
Win	2–0	(United States) Red Ferris	KO	1	August 15, 1969	(United States) Sioux Falls, South Dakota, U.S.	
Win	1–0	(United States) Bobby Street	KO	1	August 7, 1969	(United States) Milwaukee, Wisconsin, U.S.	
