= Garland, Alabama =

Unincorporated community in Alabama, United States

- Unincorporated community
- Location within Alabama Location within the United States
- Coordinates: 31°33′24″N 86°49′24″W
- Country: United States
- State: Alabama
- County: Butler
- Elevation: 210 ft (64 m)
- Time zone: UTC-6 (Central (CST))
  - Summer (DST): UTC-5 (CDT)
- Area code: 334
- GNIS feature ID: 118835

Garland is an unincorporated community in Butler County, Alabama, United States, located 6 miles (9.7 km) west of McKenzie.

== History ==
The community was named in 1831 for W. P. Garland, who was one of the chief engineers on the Mobile and Montgomery Railroad. At one time, Garland had a hotel, saw mill, drug store, shoe shop, school, and five general stores. Garland was formerly home to a Masonic lodge, Garland Lodge No. 684. A post office operated under the name Garland from 1860 to 1975.

== Notable people ==
- Earnie Shavers, former professional boxer
- Hank Williams, singer-songwriter. Hank and his family lived with his maternal grandmother in Garland for a short time.
