= Manuel Ramos (boxer) =

Mexican boxer

Personal information
- Nickname: Pulgarcito
- Born: November 20, 1942 Hermosillo, Mexico
- Died: June 6, 1999 (aged 56) Mexico City, Mexico
- Height: 6 ft 4 in (1.93 m)
- Weight: Heavyweight

Boxing career
- Stance: Orthodox

Boxing record
- Total fights: 56
- Wins: 24
- Win by KO: 19
- Losses: 29
- Draws: 3
- No contests: 0

Manuel Ramos (November 20, 1942 – June 6, 1999), nicknamed Pulgarcito (Tom Thumb), was a Mexican boxer and actor. He was the heavyweight champion of Mexico, a top world title contender in the late 1960s, and one of Mexico's most internationally successful heavyweights. On June 24, 1968, Ramos became the first Mexican to challenge for the heavyweight crown when he fought reigning champion Joe Frazier at Madison Square Garden in New York City.

== Biography ==
Manuel Ramos was born in Hermosillo, Sonora, Mexico. He boxed professionally for two to three years in the early 1960s, but records of this period have not been preserved. He defeated Indio Lopez for the Mexican heavyweight title on June 24, 1963, by first-round knockout. He next fought a series of American opponents in Los Angeles area venues, attaining a mixed record of 5–6–2.

His fortunes improved dramatically from 1966 to 1968, with a string of 13 victories, including a split decision over former title contender Eddie Machen and a unanimous decision over former WBA champion Ernie Terrell. This led to him being ranked #4 by The Ring Magazine and set up a title match with NYSAC World Champion Joe Frazier.

The bout was held at Madison Square Garden on June 24, 1968. The iconic arena had just opened four months earlier, and Ramos was the first Mexican fighter to appear there. The match was an intense two-round battle, in which Ramos briefly staggered Frazier, but was then knocked down twice and lost by referee's stoppage when he signaled that he was unable to continue. This was to be Ramos's only world title fight.

He continued to be ranked as a top heavyweight through the end of the 1960s, but losses to George Chuvalo, Jack O'Halloran, and Chuck Wepner (in which Ramos inflicted serious cuts on his opponent but went on to lose by unanimous decision) marked the beginning of his decline. After a period as a gatekeeper for up-and-coming heavyweights in the early 1970s, he lost 15 straight fights and retired from boxing in 1977.

Outside of the ring, Ramos had roles in the Mexican films Nosotros los feos (1973) and El Loco Bronco (1989).

He worked as an office manager in the Mexican Navy, resigning in 1995.

Manuel Ramos died from a heart attack in Mexico City on June 6, 1999.

== Professional boxing record ==
24 Wins (19 knockouts, 5 decisions), 29 Losses (9 knockouts, 19 decisions, 1 disqualification), 3 Draws
Res.	Record	Opponent	Type	Round	Date	Location	Notes
Loss	24-29-3	Bob Hazelton	TKO	2 (10)	June 30, 1977	Marshall, Texas	
Loss	24-28-3	Ruben Rivera	KO	1 (10)	January 1, 1977	Monterrey, Nuevo León	date uncertain
Loss	24-27-3	Bernardo Mercado	KO	5 (8)	May 13, 1976	Civic Auditorium, Albuquerque, New Mexico	
Loss	24-26-3	Fernando Montes	DQ	7 (10)	October 3, 1975	Nuevo Laredo, Tamaulipas	
Loss	24-25-3	Moi Martinez	Decision	10 (12)	November 17, 1974	Reynosa, Tamaulipas	
Loss	24-24-3	Duane Bobick	TKO	7 (10)	September 15, 1973	Scope Arena, Norfolk, Virginia	
Loss	24-23-3	Armando Zanini	Decision	8	June 15, 1973	Milan, Lombardy	
Loss	24-22-3	Luis Faustino Pires	Decision	10	May 5, 1973	Ginásio Presidente Médici, Brasília, Distrito Federal	
Loss	24-21-3	John Hudgins	TKO	4 (10)	March 24, 1972	International Amphitheatre, Chicago, Illinois	
Loss	24-20-3	Ron Lyle	UD	10	October 9, 1971	Auditorium Arena, Denver, Colorado	
Loss	24-19-3	Ron Stander	UD	10	August 26, 1971	City Auditorium, Omaha, Nebraska	
Loss	24-18-3	Terry Daniels	UD	10	July 26, 1971	Astrodome, Houston, Texas	
Loss	24-17-3	Elmo Henderson	Decision	10	May 14, 1971	Nuevo Laredo, Tamaulipas	
Loss	24-16-3	Jack Bodell	Decision	10	April 13, 1971	Civic Hall, Wolverhampton, West Midlands	
Loss	24-15-3	Jürgen Blin	Decision	10	April 2, 1971	Cologne, North Rhine-Westphalia	
Win	24-14-3	Joe Murphy Goodwin	TKO	3 (10)	March 16, 1971	Oklahoma City, Oklahoma	
Loss	23-14-3	José Roman	Decision	10	October 26, 1970	San Juan	
Draw	23-13-3	Ron Stander	Decision	10	September 17, 1970	City Auditorium, Omaha, Nebraska	
Loss	23-13-2	Jimmy Richards	Decision	10	August 29, 1970	Ellis Park Stadium, Johannesburg, Gauteng	
Loss	23-12-2	Oscar Bonavena	KO	1 (10)	May 9, 1970	Luna Park, Buenos Aires	
Loss	23-11-2	Joe Bugner	Decision	8	March 24, 1970	Wembley Stadium, London	
Win	23-10-2	Dub GW Manis	TKO	8 (10)	March 3, 1970	Oklahoma City, Oklahoma	
Loss	22-10-2	Chuck Wepner	UD	10	January 26, 1970	Madison Square Garden, New York, New York	
Loss	22-9-2	Jack O'Halloran	KO	7 (10)	October 17, 1969	The Forum, Inglewood, California	
Win	22-8-2	Tony Doyle	UD	10	September 11, 1969	Olympic Auditorium, Los Angeles, California	
Loss	21-8-2	George Chuvalo	TKO	5 (10)	September 26, 1968	Madison Square Garden, New York, New York	
Win	21-7-2	Earl Averette	TKO	4 (10)	August 27, 1968	Municipal Auditorium, San Antonio, Texas	
Loss	20-7-2	Joe Frazier	TKO	2 (15)	June 24, 1968	Madison Square Garden, New York, New York	NYSAC heavyweight title fight
Win	20-6-2	Ron Reiter	KO	1 (10)	May 4, 1968	Nogales, Veracruz	
Win	19-6-2	Everett Copeland	Decision	10	March 17, 1968	Culiacán, Sinaloa	
Win	18-6-2	Ernie Terrell	UD	10	October 14, 1967	Estadio Azteca, Mexico City	
Win	17-6-2	Johnny Featherman	TKO	3 (10)	August 9, 1967	Mérida, Yucatán	
Win	16-6-2	Floyd Joyner	KO	2 (10)	May 25, 1967	Puebla, Puebla	
Win	15-6-2	James J. Woody	KO	2 (10)	January 29, 1967	El Toreo de Cuatro Caminos, Mexico City	
Win	14-6-2	Max Martinez	KO	2 (10)	December 19, 1966	Reynosa, Tamaulipas	
Win	13-6-2	Don Koontz	KO	2 (10)	October 22, 1966	El Toreo, Mexico City	
Win	12-6-2	Dave Centi	KO	3 (10)	September 11, 1966	Plaza de Toros, Ciudad Juárez, Chihuahua	
Win	11-6-2	Wayne Heath	KO	2 (10)	August 7, 1966	Plaza México, Mexico City	
Win	10-6-2	Eddie Machen	SD	10	June 3, 1966	Sports Arena, Los Angeles, California	
Win	9-6-2	Archie Ray	TKO	8 (10)	May 16, 1966	Veterans Memorial Coliseum, Phoenix, Arizona	
Win	8-6-2	Lars Olof Norling	TKO	8 (10)	May 5, 1966	Olympic Auditorium, Los Angeles, California	
Win	7-6-2	John Henry Jackson	KO	2 (10)	April 23, 1966	Pacific International Arena, Portland, Oregon, Oregon	
Win	6-6-2	Jerry Simms	KO	6 (10)	March 31, 1966	Olympic Auditorium, Los Angeles, California	
Loss	5-6-2	Lars Olof Norling	TD	6 (10)	December 9, 1965	Olympic Auditorium, Los Angeles, California	accidental headbutt
Draw	5-5-2	George Johnson	Decision	10	November 4, 1965	Olympic Auditorium, Los Angeles, California	
Loss	5-5-1	Joey Orbillo	UD	10	October 7, 1965	Olympic Auditorium, Los Angeles, California	
Loss	5-4-1	Wayne Heath	SD	10	September 9, 1965	Olympic Auditorium, Los Angeles, California	
Loss	5-3-1	Ski Goldstein	Decision	10	February 5, 1965	Olympic Auditorium, Los Angeles, California	
Draw	5-2-1	Joey Orbillo	Decision	8	August 13, 1964	Olympic Auditorium, Los Angeles, California	
Loss	5-2	Henry Clark	Decision	10	July 16, 1964	Olympic Auditorium, Los Angeles, California	
Loss	5-1	Al Carter	Decision	10	May 12, 1964	Valley Garden Arena, North Hollywood, California	
Win	5-0	Sam Pride	TKO	3 (10)	April 28, 1964	Valley Garden Arena, North Hollywood, California	
Win	4-0	Al Carter	Decision	6	March 17, 1964	Valley Garden Arena, North Hollywood, California	
Win	3-0	Larry McGee	KO	3 (6)	February 18, 1964	Valley Garden Arena, North Hollywood, California	
Win	2-0	Kid Apache	KO	4 (8)	January 23, 1964	Olympic Auditorium, Los Angeles, California	
Win	1-0	Indio Lopez	KO	1 (12)	June 24, 1963	Mexico City	Mexico heavyweight title
