= Nosotros los feos =

- Directed by: Ismael Rodríguez
- Written by: Ismael Rodríguez
- Produced by: Ismael Rodríguez
- Starring: Sara García
- Cinematography: Rosalío Solano
- Edited by: Gloria Schoemann
- Music by: Raúl Lavista
- Production companies: Matela Films S.A. Películas Rodríguez
- Release date: November 29, 1973
- Running time: 95 minute
- Country: Mexico
- Language: Spanish

Nosotros los feos ("We the Ugly") is a 1973 Mexican film. It stars Sara García.

== Cast ==
Apart from Garcia and Sergio Ramos, the film is notable for having a cast that included many famous professional boxers, including world champion boxers Rubén Olivares, Rafael Herrera and Raul Macias as well as Octavio "Famoso" Gomez and Manuel Ramos.
