= Leroy Caldwell =

American boxer

Personal information
- Nationality: American
- Born: 1946 New Orleans, Louisiana, U.S.
- Died: February 2023 (aged 77)

Boxing career
- Weight class: Heavyweight

Boxing record
- Total fights: 64
- Wins: 27
- Win by KO: 4
- Losses: 31

Leroy Caldwell (c. 1946 — February 2023) was an American professional boxer who competed against heavyweight contenders including both Ron Lyle and George Foreman in 1971 and Earnie Shavers in 1972. In a 2020 gym interview, Caldwell credited Shavers as the hardest puncher he had ever faced.

== Professional career ==
Caldwell's first professional boxing match was on June 9, 1969, defeating Allen Heard. He defeated Heard in two consecutive rematches between June and July of that year, all fought in Caldwell's home state of Louisiana.

Caldwell went on to become a journeyman fighter, competing against a range of heavyweights. His first notable challenge was fought on December 9, 1969, against Cleveland "Big Cat" Williams. Two years later on July 24, 1971, Caldwell fought Ron Lyle, losing by a unanimous decision. Two months later on September 21, 1971, Caldwell lost a fight against George Foreman via knockout.

On October 25, 1972, Caldwell lost a fight against heavyweight contender Earnie Shavers. In later years, Caldwell described this fight as being hit with a shotgun and remembering little more than feeling the force of Shavers' punch down to his toes. He also stated by the time he woke up, he was in the dressing room and his cornermen were in the process of removing his gloves from his hands. On July 23, 1973, Caldwell lost a fight against Oscar Bonavena via technical knockout.

Caldwell's first title fight was held on July 16, 1979, against Eddie Brooks to crown the new Wisconsin State Heavyweight Champion. The match ended in a draw.

On October 6, 1981, Caldwell fought his second title fight defeating John Williams for the Nevada State Heavyweight Championship. His last fight was held on June 30, 1985, losing to Henry Tillman.

== Personal life ==
Caldwell retired in 1985 after a career spanning 64 fights. He served as a trainer in a boxing gym in Las Vegas where he resided.During his time training he promised he would train a fighter that would become a champion. He did that with Yvonne Caples. He was father of second generation boxer Caleb Caldwell.

Caldwell died in February 2023 at age 77.
