= Ron Lyle =

American boxer (1941–2011)

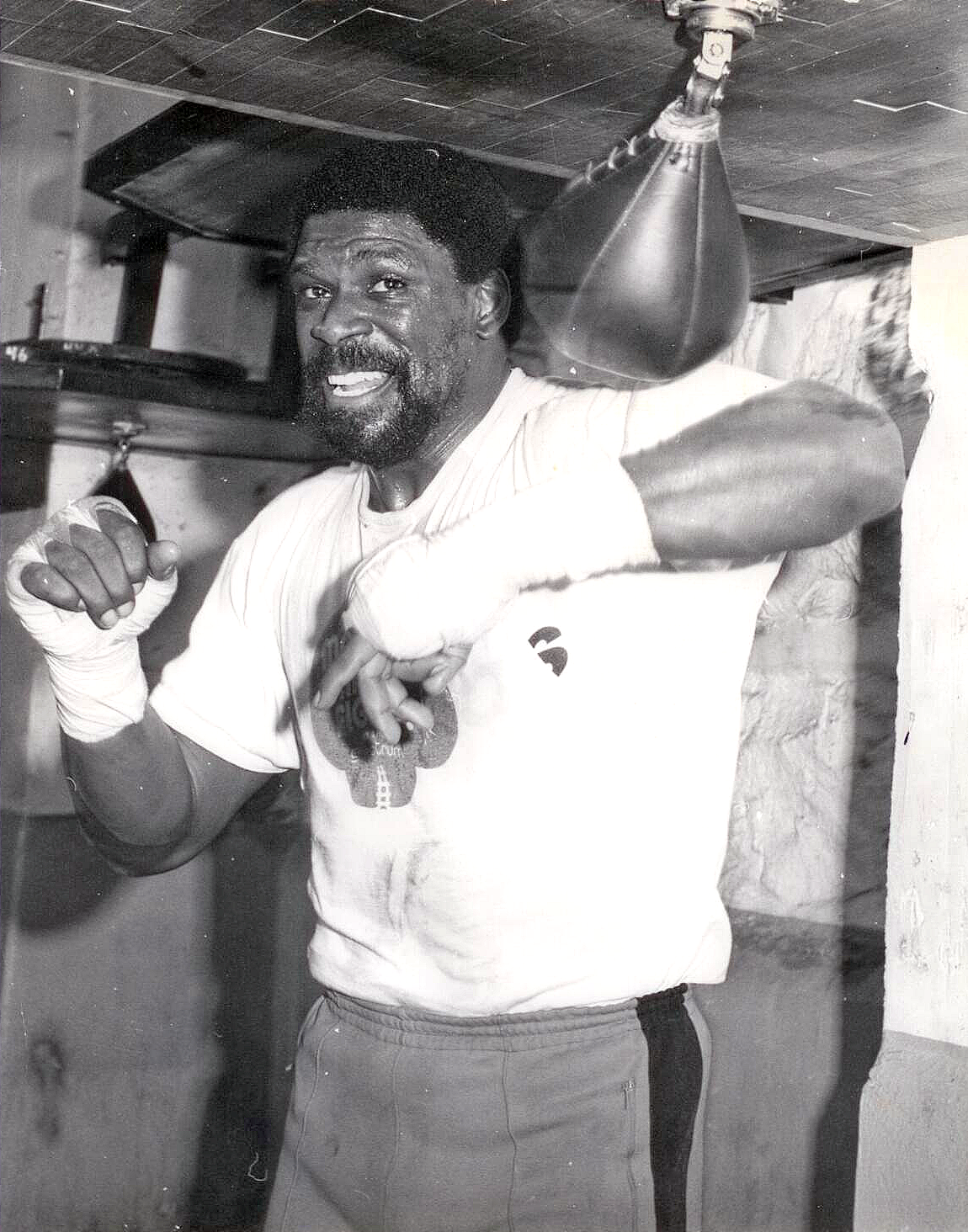
- Lyle c. 1967

Personal information
- Nationality: American
- Born: Ronald David Lyle; February 12, 1941 Dayton, Ohio, US
- Died: November 26, 2011 (aged 70) Denver, Colorado, US
- Height: 6 ft 3 in (191 cm)
- Weight: Heavyweight

Boxing career
- Reach: 76 in (193 cm)
- Stance: Orthodox

Boxing record
- Total fights: 51
- Wins: 43
- Win by KO: 31
- Losses: 7
- Draws: 1
Medal record
Men's amateur boxing
Representing United States
North American Championships
Gold medal – first place	1970 Vancouver	Heavyweight

Ronald David Lyle (February 12, 1941 – November 26, 2011) was an American professional boxer who competed from 1971 to 1980, and in 1995. He unsuccessfully challenged for the world heavyweight championship, losing to Muhammad Ali in 1975. Known for his punching power, crowd-pleasing fighting style, and his courage and determination in the ring, Lyle defeated Buster Mathis, Oscar Bonavena, Jimmy Ellis, Vicente Rondón, Earnie Shavers, Joe Bugner, Gregorio Peralta and Scott LeDoux. He is most famous for his fight against George Foreman in 1976, which was voted Fight of the Year by The Ring magazine.

== Early life and education ==
Lyle was born the third of 19 children to William and Nellie Lyle of Dayton, Ohio. In 1954, they moved to Denver, Colorado, where his father (a part-time minister) had a job as a sandblaster at Buckley Air Force Base. Nellie had been a missionary. The family resided in housing projects on Denver's northeast side.

Lyle associated with street gangs in his Whittier neighborhood. He dropped out of Manual High School at age 17 after the school basketball coach told him he would not be on the team.

== Prison and introduction to boxing ==
At age 19, he was involved in the shooting death of a 21-year-old gang rival. Lyle argued he was being attacked with a lead pipe and was not the one who pulled the trigger, but he was convicted of second-degree murder and sentenced to 15 to 25 years in the Colorado State Penitentiary. He nearly died on an operating table there after being stabbed by another inmate, but survived after 36 blood transfusions. In solitary confinement for 90 days afterward, he began doing push-ups, sit-ups, squats, and other exercises, and he trained regularly from then on.

While in prison, Lyle, then age 26 and known as Ronnie, enlisted the African-American self-help group Black Cultural Development Society (BCDS) and coached the prison's football team, The Wildcats, leading them to a championship among the inter-prison teams. He also played baseball and basketball on the prison's teams, the Cañon City Rockbusters.

He first attended a prison boxing event on July 4, 1962, as a spectator, where he decided he could compete as well. His prison boxing debut came in 1964. Lyle credited Lt. Cliff Mattax, the prison's athletic director for developing his interest in boxing. When Mattax first approached Lyle and tried to befriend him, he wasn't welcomed, "Man, you're a screw and I'm a convict. I came here by myself and I'll leave the same way." After recovering from the stab wound, he changed his mind. "It was the turning point of my life. Mattax was white, and he wore a badge, but he really cared. He believed in me and my ability. Right then I decided to be a success," Lyle said later. Mattax in turn said, "I don't like to take any credit for what happened, but Ron turned into a real gentleman."

He watched boxing on TV and said, "I can do better than that," and soon the prison was bringing in boxers for him to fight. "They had fight cards in prison. I sat around watching them for a while and finally said to myself, 'I can do that,'" Lyle said. In his first match for the prison boxing team, Lyle was said to have been defeated by Texas Johnson. He never lost a prison boxing match again. According to Colorado State's Warden Wayne K. Patterson, Lyle was a "natural born athlete."

== Amateur career ==
During the remainder of his sentence, he had around twenty-five unaccounted amateur fights, losing only once, and winning six heavyweight titles for inmates. By 1969 Lyle was eligible for parole, but twice he was turned down. He was told that a professional boxing career was not a suitable parole plan. Fortunately, his fame had spread to Denver, where the Denver Rocks boxing team had just joined the short-lived International Boxing League. Bill Daniels, a cable television executive, president of American Basketball Association and owner of the Denver Rocks boxing team and the Utah Stars basketball team, offered Lyle an official job as a welder with a firm he owned, and on November 9, 1969, Lyle was released from prison on parole. He was released on parole on November 22, 1969, after serving 7½ years. The next morning, he arrived at the Rocks' Gym in Denver (later known as Elks Gym) to try out with the Rocks. He made the team, and in the succeeding fifteen months, before turning pro, he won a number of tournaments. He was later given a full pardon by the Governor John Arthur Love.

"I asked around about the Rocks. They told me they already had a heavyweight (Richard Archuletta and Dan Hermosillo). I figured I could whip him so I stuck around." They were trained by the well-known boxing veteran Bobby Lewis. Less than a month later, Lyle made his amateur debut with the team, avenged an earlier Rocks' heavyweight loss and became the team's heavyweight at 215 pounds. Lyle's first amateur victory was a third-round knockout over Fred Houpe (who would later be Leon Spinks's final opponent). He was the 1970 National AAU Heavyweight Champion (outpointed previously unbeaten Mike Montgomery of Philadelphia), the 1970 North American Amateur Heavyweight Champion, and the 1970 International Boxing League Heavyweight Champion. After capturing the NAA title, Lyle became a member of the United States National Boxing Team, as he was still on parole he was given permission to leave the US, and dispatched on a boxing journey across Europe, visiting Italy, Yugoslavia, and Romania and meeting top local heavyweights in the process. He lost by decision to Romanian Ion Alexe, but pounded Soviet Armenian heavyweight Kamo Saroyan (89–9) against the ropes (referee stopped the contest and saved Saroyan from further pounding) in a match broadcast by ABC television's Wide World of Sports, preparing for which he quit his regular job and dispatched of Duane Bobick, which took the latter's corner five minutes to bring him back into consciousness. No American before Lyle knocked out a Soviet heavyweight on the US soil. Fighting Bobick to make it to the national team, Lyle was behind on judges' scorecards, and when he fought Saroyan, he again was behind on points, which nonetheless didn't stop him from knocking out both. On January 25, 1971, Lyle fought his last fight as an amateur, knocking out the Pacific Northwest Golden Gloves heavyweight champion Jim Wahlberg. Meanwhile, two world's top-ranked heavyweights, Muhammad Ali and Joe Frazier, were preparing themselves for the Fight of the Century. In February, Lyle visited both rival camps. First he went to Miami Beach, Florida, where the Ali's training camp was based, to spar several rounds with Ali. Then he went to Catskill, New York, to the Frazier's camp, but Yancey Durham, Frazier's manager, did not approve Lyle as a sparring partner, instead he went against one of Frazier's previously selected sparring partners, a professional boxer from Chicago (Frazier reportedly has invited Lyle for a two-round exhibition at Kiamesha Lake, New York, on January 19, but Lyle was busy qualifying to fight the Soviet.)

=== Highlights ===
IBL Denver–Chicago match-up (Denver Rocks vs. Chicago Clippers), Auditorium Arena, Denver, Colorado, December 1969:

- Defeated Fred Houpe KO 3

IBL Eastern–Western Division match-up (Kentucky Pacers vs. Denver Rocks), Memorial Auditorium, Louisville, Kentucky, January 1970:

- Lost to Tommy Garrett by split decision 1–2

IBL Denver–Milwaukee match-up (Denver Rocks vs. Milwaukee Bombers), Auditorium Arena, Denver, Colorado, January 1970:

- Defeated James Sherard KO 2 (Lyle was voted Outstanding Fighter of the match)

(gold) Denver Golden Gloves, 1970:

- (no data available)

(gold) Colorado State Golden Gloves, February 1970:

- (no data available)

(gold) Regional Golden Gloves, Salt Palace, Salt Lake City, Utah, February 1970:

- 1/2: Defeated Charles Schoolmeyer KO 1
- Finals: Defeated Charles Banks KO 1

National Golden Gloves, Convention Center, Las Vegas, Nevada, March 1970:

- 1/16: Defeated Lerdy Sargent KO 1
- 1/8: Defeated Alan Kit Boursse TKO 3 (0:59)
- 1/4: Defeated Nick Wells by decision
- 1/2: Lost to William Thompson by decision

IBL Detroit–Denver (Detroit Dukes vs. Denver Rocks), Community Arts Building, State Fairgrounds, Detroit, Michigan, April 1970:

- Lost to Bill Hurt by decision

IBL Denver–Miami match-up (Denver Rocks vs. Miami Barracudas), Auditorium Arena, Denver, Colorado, April 1970:

- Defeated ?

(gold) National Championships, Trenton, New Jersey, April–May 1970:

- 1/2: Defeated Duane Bobick KO 2
- Finals: Defeated Mike Montgomery by decision (Montgomery knocked down in the 2nd rd)

IBL Denver–Milwaukee match-up (Denver Rocks vs. Milwaukee Bombers), 1970:

- Defeated Larry Penigar by split decision 2–1

(gold) North American Championships, Vancouver, Canada, June 1970:

- Finals: Defeated Jack Meda (Canada) by decision

IBL Denver–Louisville match-up (Denver Rocks vs. Kentucky Pacers), Auditorium Arena, Denver, Colorado, June 1970:

- Defeated Tommy Garrett

(gold) IBL Championships (Denver Rocks vs. Kentucky Pacers), Auditorium Arena, Denver, Colorado, June 1970:

- Defeated Billy Freeman by split decision 3–2

Italy–USA Duals (Rocky Marciano Trophy), Palazzo dello Sport, Rome, Italy, June 1970:

- Defeated Amedeo Laureti (Italy) KO 1 (2:21)

Yugoslavia–USA Duals, Belgrade, Yugoslavia, July 1970:

- Defeated Anton Vukušić (Yugoslavia)

Romania–USA Duals, Bucharest, Romania, July 1970:

- Lost to Ion Alexe (Romania) by decision

(gold) Rocky Mountain Golden Gloves, Derks Field, Salt Lake City, Utah, July 1970:

- (no data available)

IBL Denver–Mexico Exhibition (Denver Rocks vs. all-star Mexican team), State Fair Grounds, Pueblo, Colorado, August 1970:

- Defeated Pete Chiano (San Antonio, Texas) TKO 1 (1:49)
- Defeated Pedro Vega (Mexico)

National Team Selection Eliminator, Fort Carson, Colorado, January 1971:

- Finals: Defeated Duane Bobick KO 2 (0:30)

USA–USSR Duals, Caesars Palace, Las Vegas, Nevada, January 1971:

- Defeated Kamo Saroyan (Soviet Union) TKO 2 (0:30)

IBL Denver–Seattle match-up (Denver Rocks vs. the Pacific Northwest team), Auditorium Arena, Denver, Colorado, January 1971:

- Defeated Jim Wahlberg KO

His amateur career outside of prison lasted only 14 months, during which he compiled a record of 25–4 (no stoppages,) with 17 knockouts at national and international contests. (plus unaccounted record of 23–1, 15 KOs, and also without a stoppage, while serving seven-and-a-half-years prison term, bringing his overall amateur record to around 47–5.) During his amateur days he was never knocked down or cut. Lyle was an obvious choice for the 1971 Pan American Games and the 1972 Olympics, but as he stepped into the pro ranks, Duane Bobick, whom he knocked out twice, was set to represent the United States.

On February 24, 1971, Lyle, age 30, signed a professional boxing contract with Bill Daniels. "Daniels told me 'You fight this Russian in January and we'll turn you pro.' This was the door that had to be opened, whuppin' the Russian. So I quit my job and trained for six months. I wasn't going to get beat because I wasn't in shape," Lyle recalled. Daniels, in turn, said of Lyle that, "The reason Ron has adjusted is that he's got a talent, something he knows he's good at and can dedicate himself to."

After he turned pro, Lyle visited his fellow inmates in prison the day before or after each and every professional fight.

== Professional career ==
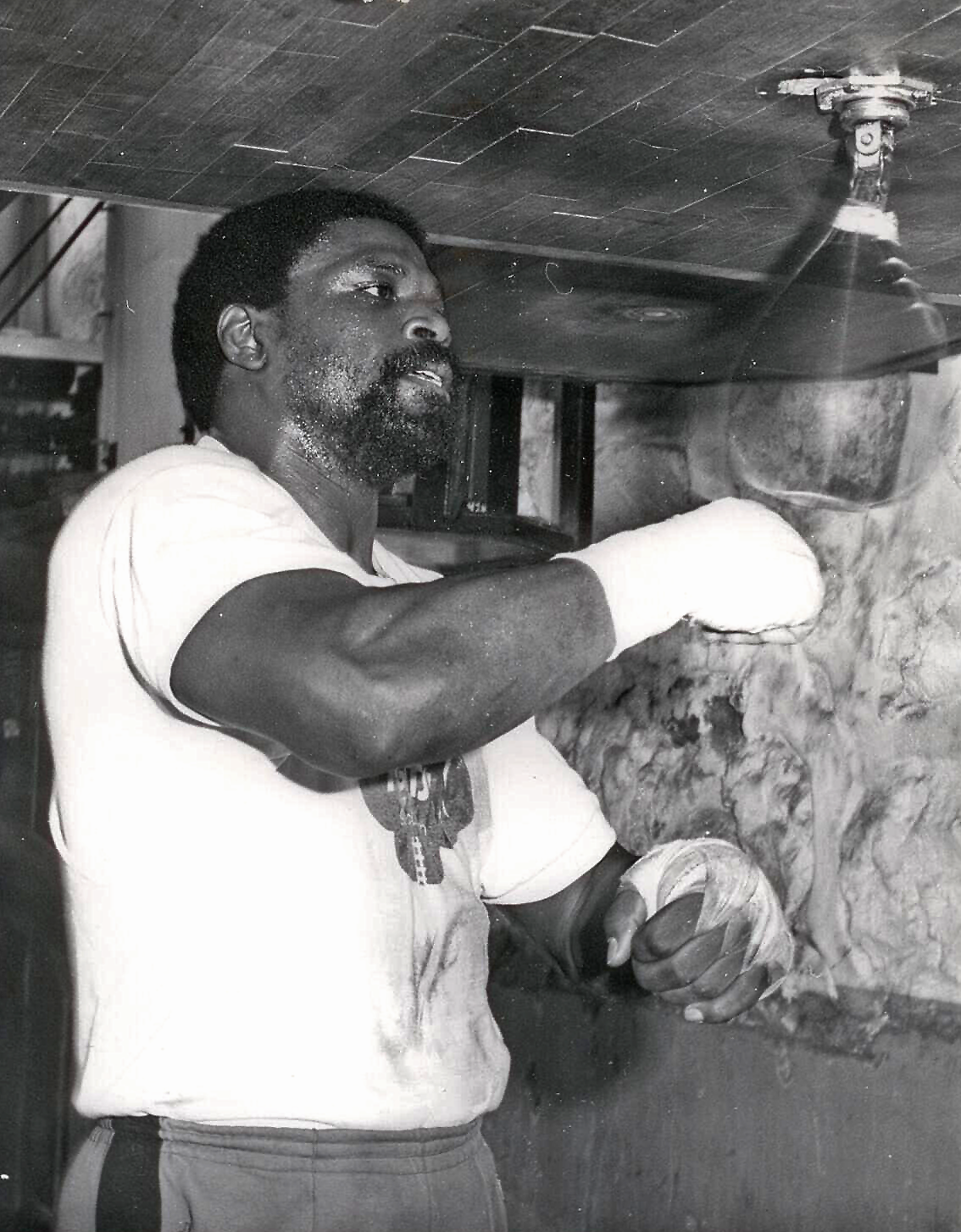
Lyle punching a speed bag

Lyle started professional boxing in age 30. He turned professional under Bill Daniels, with trainer Bobby Lewis. His first fight was at age 30 in Denver, Colorado, against A. J. Staples, which he won by knockout in the second round. Lyle went on to post a 19–0 record with 17 knockouts, and became the 5th rated heavyweight contender. He scored impressive knockouts over notables Vicente Rondon, a light heavyweight champion; hulking Buster Mathis; and won by unanimous decision over former WBA Heavyweight Champion, Jimmy Ellis. After dispatching Buster Mathis, Lyle stated that he was looking for a match-up versus current undisputed champion Joe Frazier, saying, "When I'm ready. I'm not taking any shortcuts." Yancey Durham, Frazier's manager and an interested observer, did compliment Lyle on his punching power. Lyle was ranked #4 heavyweight in the world by WBA and The Ring magazine. Lyle's undefeated streak ended on a one-sided decision to veteran Jerry Quarry: the latter gave one of his career best performances using a boxer/puncher style to create openings first, gaining the initiative using his greater experience. Lyle then lost to Jimmy Young in 1975. In a later rematch, Young again edged Lyle and went on to outpoint George Foreman in 1977.

=== Lyle vs. Ali ===
On May 16, 1975, he was given an opportunity to face heavyweight champion Muhammad Ali, during Ali's second title defense in his second reign as champion. Lyle had Bobby Lewis and Chico Ferrara in his corner. Lyle was the more aggressive fighter in the early rounds, with Ali conserving his energy and covering up in the center of the ring allowing Lyle to score. Lyle also showed restraint and did not respond to Ali's attempts at the rope-a-dope ploy. Though in danger of falling too far behind on points, Ali appeared to be in control of the pace of the fight, and picked his moments to score. The fight was close going into the 11th round, with Lyle winning on all three of the judges' score cards. Ali then hit Lyle with a strong right hand and followed with several flurrying punches, scoring. The referee stopped the fight, seeing that Lyle was unable to defend himself and Ali was punching him in the head at will. Lyle's corner was not happy with the referee's decision.

=== Lyle vs. Foreman ===
No one, beyond Sonny Liston, ever stood up to me. Everybody would have to run, hide, cover-up . . . no one stood up to me. But Ron Lyle decided, "I ain't run." And he hit me so hard it didn't even hurt. There I was on the canvas thinking, "What excuse are you gonna have now?" I had to get up. But when I got up, he knocked me down again. He beat me so bad, after while he fainted . . . and I won the fight. That was most memorable fight, 'cause I kept thinking, "Why am I here?"

— George Foreman, on his fight versus Lyle

Lyle is perhaps best known for a brawling fight in 1976 with Hall of Famer George Foreman. Foreman was making a comeback after suffering his first loss to Muhammad Ali in the Rumble in the Jungle match.

The fight between Lyle and Foreman is considered one of the most exciting and brutal in heavyweight history. Lyle took the offensive against the former champion and won the opening round. At one point, he hit Foreman with a thunderous right hand followed by a staggering body punch. After nearly being knocked out in Round Two, Lyle was able to recover due to a timing error resulting in the round being only two minutes instead of the scheduled three. Later in the fight, Lyle amazed the crowd by flooring Foreman twice in the fourth round while being knocked down once himself. (Lyle, Muhammad Ali and Jimmy Young are the only boxers to have ever knocked down Foreman during a professional boxing match.) Foreman later said that Lyle was the toughest man and the hardest hitter he ever fought. Foreman recovered and scored a knockout in the fifth round. He later said he won due to Lyle's exhaustion.

Lyle scored impressive victories over rated José Luis García, and big names Oscar Bonavena and Earnie Shavers during his career. He also won a split decision over Joe Bugner, boring in with a thudding body attack in a fine contest.

According to George Foreman, Ron Lyle was one of the three hardest punchers he had faced in his career along with Gerry Cooney and Cleveland Williams.

Nobody ever hit me that hard. No question about it. I'll remember that punch on my deathbed.

Ron Lyle was a tremendous puncher.... Great guy, good guy, good-hearted guy. We became very good friends over the years.... Maybe once or twice a month we'd call each other, talk on the phone.

— Earnie Shavers

=== Later years ===
The year 1979 marked a decline in Lyle's abilities. Draws with fringe contenders Stan Ward and Scott LeDoux were followed by a stunning one-punch loss to unheard-of Lynn Ball. Ball went on to match other names but never achieved similar success. The Ring magazine quoted Lyle as saying afterwards, "No one does that to me."

Ron Lyle briefly returned to the boxing ring, but he retired again after a first-round knockout loss to then-rising star and undefeated power-hitting Gerry Cooney, who has stated he broke some of Lyle's ribs during the match. Lyle was 39 years old.

In 1995, after George Foreman made his comeback into the ring to capture the world heavyweight title again, Lyle, at the age of 54, also decided on a brief comeback. After scoring four quick knockouts over second-rate opponents, Lyle tried to get a rematch with Foreman. The match was never made, however, and Lyle retired from boxing.

=== Retirement ===
Lyle ran the boxing gym Denver Red Shield in Denver. He was the former trainer of light welterweight contender Victor Ortíz, who fought out of Denver during some of his amateur career.

In 1992, Lyle trained a young promising talent from Las Vegas, Arash Hashemi, and under his mentorship Hashemi won two Golden Gloves championships.

Lyle was working as a security guard in Las Vegas in 2002.

== In the media and popular culture ==
A biography, Off the Ropes: the Ron Lyle Story, was written by Candace Toft and released in the UK by Scratching Shed Publishing in May 2010. It was republished in the United States by Hamilcar Publications in October 2018.

Ron Lyle appeared in the film Facing Ali, a 2009 documentary, where he discusses his life and career. About his fight against Ali, when referee Fredy Nunez stopped the fight, he said "I couldn't believe it, you know. I'm ahead on all scorecards. [...] Am I bitter? Forget about it. I never took it personal. If there don't be no Ali, you think you'd be sitting here talking to Ron Lyle? About what?"

During this documentary he claimed that during his stint in prison, where he received one meal a day consisting of a bowl of spinach, he performed up to 1,000 push-ups in an hour each day.

== Personal life ==
Lyle was charged with first-degree homicide at the age of 36, after he had shot and killed a man on New Year's Eve 1977 in his home in Lakewood, Colorado near Denver. The victim was an acquaintance with who had spent time with Lyle at the Colorado State Penitentiary. On December 16, 1978, Lyle was acquitted. His attorney Walter Gerash said Lyle shot Clark in self-defense.

== Death ==
Lyle died at age 70 on November 26, 2011, from complications from a sudden stomach ailment.

== Professional boxing record ==
51 fights	43 wins	7 losses
By knockout	31	4
By decision	12	3
Draws	1	

No.	Result	Record	Opponent	Type	Round, time	Date	Location	Notes
51	Win	43–7–1	Dave Slaughter	TKO	2 (10)	Aug 18, 1995	Regency Hotel, Denver, Colorado, US	
50	Win	42–7–1	Ed Strickland	KO	2	Jun 9, 1995	Erlanger, Kentucky, US	
49	Win	41–7–1	Tim Pollard	TKO	2	May 12, 1995	Peel's Palace, Erlanger, Kentucky, US	
48	Win	40–7–1	Bruce Johnson	KO	4 (10)	Apr 7, 1995	Peels Palace, Erlanger, Kentucky, US	
47	Loss	39–7–1	Gerry Cooney	KO	1 (10), 2:49	Oct 24, 1980	Nassau Veterans Memorial Coliseum, Hempstead, New York, US	
46	Win	39–6–1	George O'Mara	KO	10 (10), 0:37	Aug 23, 1980	Forum, Inglewood, California, US	
45	Win	38–6–1	Al Neumann	TKO	10 (10)	Jun 19, 1980	University of Puget Sound Fieldhouse, Tacoma, Washington, US	
44	Loss	37–6–1	Lynn Ball	TKO	2 (10), 2:55	Dec 12, 1979	Celebrity Theatre, Phoenix, Arizona, US	
43	Win	37–5–1	Scott LeDoux	SD	10	May 12, 1979	Caesars Palace, Las Vegas, Nevada, US	
42	Win	36–5–1	Fili Moala	TKO	8 (10), 1:51	Apr 6, 1979	San Diego Stadium, San Diego, California, US	
41	Win	35–5–1	Horace Robinson	RTD	8 (10), 0:01	Jun 3, 1978	Auditorium Arena, Denver, Colorado, US	
40	Win	34–5–1	Stan Ward	MD	10	Sep 14, 1977	Caesars Palace, Paradise, Nevada, US	
39	Win	33–5–1	Joe Bugner	SD	12	Mar 20, 1977	Caesars Palace, Paradise, Nevada, US	
38	Loss	32–5–1	Jimmy Young	UD	12	Nov 6, 1976	Civic Auditorium, San Francisco, California, US	
37	Win	32–4–1	Kevin Isaac	TKO	7 (10), 1:14	Sep 11, 1976	Memorial Auditorium, Utica, New York, US	
36	Loss	31–4–1	George Foreman	KO	5 (12), 2:28	Jan 24, 1976	Caesars Palace, Paradise, Nevada, US	For vacant NABF heavyweight title
35	Win	31–3–1	Earnie Shavers	TKO	6 (12), 0:47	Sep 13, 1975	Coliseum, Denver, Colorado, US	
34	Loss	30–3–1	Muhammad Ali	TKO	11 (15), 1:08	May 16, 1975	Las Vegas Convention Center, Winchester, Nevada, US	For WBA, WBC, The Ring, and lineal heavyweight titles
33	Loss	30–2–1	Jimmy Young	UD	10	Feb 11, 1975	International Center Arena, Honolulu, Hawaii, US	
32	Win	30–1–1	Al Jones	TKO	5 (10), 1:43	Dec 13, 1974	Municipal Auditorium, New Orleans, Louisiana, US	
31	Win	29–1–1	Boone Kirkman	TKO	8 (10), 2:02	Sep 17, 1974	Center Coliseum, Seattle, Washington, US	
30	Win	28–1–1	Jimmy Ellis	UD	12	Jul 16, 1974	Denver, Colorado, US	
29	Win	27–1–1	Oscar Bonavena	UD	12	Mar 19, 1974	Coliseum, Denver, Colorado, US	
28	Draw	26–1–1	Gregorio Peralta	PTS	10	Nov 17, 1973	Frankfurt, West Germany	
27	Win	26–1	Larry Middleton	UD	10	Oct 31, 1973	Civic Center, Baltimore, Maryland, US	
26	Win	25–1	Jürgen Blin	TKO	2 (10), 1:01	Oct 4, 1973	Denver, Colorado, US	
25	Win	24–1	José Luis García	KO	3 (10), 1:01	Aug 15, 1973	Denver, Colorado, US	
24	Win	23–1	Lou Bailey	UD	10	Jul 3, 1973	State Fairgrounds International Building, Oklahoma City, Oklahoma, US	
23	Win	22–1	Wendell Newton	SD	10	Jun 11, 1973	Spectrum, Philadelphia, Pennsylvania, US	
22	Win	21–1	Gregorio Peralta	UD	10	May 12, 1973	Coliseum, Denver, Colorado, US	
21	Win	20–1	Bob Stallings	UD	10	Apr 14, 1973	Harry Adams Field House, Missoula, Montana, US	
20	Loss	19–1	Jerry Quarry	UD	12	Feb 9, 1973	Madison Square Garden, New York, New York, US	
19	Win	19–0	Larry Middleton	KO	3 (10), 2:34	Dec 9, 1972	Coliseum, Denver, Colorado, US	
18	Win	18–0	Luis Faustino Pires	KO	3 (10), 2:55	Oct 28, 1972	Coliseum, Denver, Colorado, US	
17	Win	17–0	Buster Mathis	KO	2 (10), 2:58	Sep 29, 1972	Coliseum, Denver, Colorado, US	
16	Win	16–0	Vicente Rondón	TKO	2 (10), 1:41	Jul 11, 1972	Mile High Stadium, Denver, Colorado, US	
15	Win	15–0	Mike Boswell	TKO	7 (10)	May 25, 1972	Civic Auditorium, Omaha, Nebraska, US	
14	Win	14–0	Mel Turnbow	TKO	4 (10), 2:59	May 10, 1972	Las Vegas, Nevada, US	
13	Win	13–0	George Johnson	KO	3 (10), 0:31	Mar 25, 1972	Coliseum, Denver, Colorado, US	
12	Win	12–0	Chuck Leslie	TKO	2 (10), 1:47	Jan 22, 1972	Auditorium Arena, Denver, Colorado, US	
11	Win	11–0	Bill Drover	KO	2 (10), 0:45	Dec 18, 1971	Auditorium Arena, Denver, Colorado, US	
10	Win	10–0	Jack O'Halloran	KO	4 (10), 2:15	Nov 26, 1971	Auditorium Arena, Denver, Colorado, US	
9	Win	9–0	Joe E Lewis	KO	3 (10)	Nov 10, 1971	Silver Slipper, Paradise, Nevada, US	
8	Win	8–0	Manuel Ramos	UD	10	Oct 9, 1971	Auditorium Arena, Denver, Colorado, US	
7	Win	7–0	Eddie Land	TKO	7 (10)	Sep 1, 1971	Silver Slipper, Paradise, Nevada, US	
6	Win	6–0	Frank Niblett	KO	9 (10)	Aug 11, 1971	Silver Slipper, Paradise, Nevada, US	
5	Win	5–0	Leroy Caldwell	UD	5	Jul 24, 1971	Playboy Club, Lake Geneva, Wisconsin, US	
4	Win	4–0	Edmund Stewart	TKO	2 (6)	Jul 16, 1971	Sunnyside Garden Arena, New York, New York, US	
3	Win	3–0	Gary Bates	KO	3 (4), 2:20	Jun 19, 1971	Sahara Tahoe, Stateline, Nevada, US	
2	Win	2–0	Art Miller	KO	5 (6)	May 22, 1971	Matthews Arena, Boston, Massachusetts, US	
1	Win	1–0	A J Staples	TKO	2 (6)	Apr 23, 1971	Auditorium Arena, Denver, Colorado, US	

Sporting positions
Amateur boxing titles
Previous: Earnie Shavers	U.S. heavyweight champion 1970	Next: Duane Bobick
Awards
Previous: Muhammad Ali vs. Joe Frazier III	The Ring Fight of the Year vs. George Foreman; 1976	Next: George Foreman vs. Jimmy Young
Previous: Muhammad Ali vs. Joe Frazier III; Round 12	The Ring Round of the Year; Rounds 4, 5 vs. George Foreman; 1976	Next: Muhammad Ali vs. Leon Spinks; Round 15
