= George Chaplin (boxer) =

American boxer (born 1951)

Personal information
- Born: 1951 (age 74–75) Baltimore, Maryland, U.S.
- Height: 6 ft (183 cm)
- Weight: 215 lb (98 kg)

Boxing career
- Weight class: Heavyweight

Boxing record
- Total fights: 34
- Wins: 23
- Win by KO: 10
- Losses: 9
- Draws: 2

George Chaplin (born 1951) is a retired American heavyweight boxer from Baltimore, Maryland.

== Early life ==
Chaplin is a 1968 graduate of Dunbar High School and earned a degree in physical education from Morgan State University. He served four years in the Air Force before focusing on boxing while working as a repairman of air conditioners and refrigerators in Thailand.

He was a regular at Mack Lewis' Broadway gym on Eager Street in Baltimore. During his boxing career, Chaplin worked part time at Lutheran Hospital as an orthopedic technician. Dr. Sussman, chief of orthopedics and member of trainer Mack Lewis' gym, offered the job at the hospital and teamed up with Vince Cala to promote fights to assist with advancing Chaplin's career.

== Amateur career ==
Chaplin was one of ten Maryland boxers to compete in an international match against Canadian boxers in a 1975 tune up to the Olympics. He defeated George Powell to lift the Americans to a victory of 7-3. Proceeds from the fight went to the U.S. Olympic Fund. Later that year, in November, Chaplin and nine other U.S. boxers defeated a Russian team 6-4 at Madison Square Garden. He defeated Leningrad's Serge Plisov by decision despite being knocked down for the first time.

The South Atlantic Association honored Chaplin with the outstanding boxer award February 8, 1976 after two victories in international competition against the Russians. In March, Chaplin headlined a 14-bout amateur boxing card for Olympic hopefuls.

== Professional career ==
Known as an undersized clever, cagey, elusive, slipper and slider, defensive-minded counterpuncher, Chaplin debuted as a professional on July 29, 1976. The fight took place at the Civic Center in his hometown. He knocked out Johnny Blaine in the second round with a right hook to the jaw. Six consecutive victories followed.

Chaplin faced Joe Frazier's protege, Mike Koranicki, on September 17, 1977 for a split decision loss followed by a rematch on May 25, 1979 for a win by unanimous decision.

Duane Bobick's career ended in the sixth round of a July 3, 1979 fight on the Steel Pier in Atlantic City, NJ, when Chaplin opened two deep cuts over Bobick's right eye forcing Dr. Stanley Rogers to stop the match. His next two fights were wins by unanimous decision against Larry Alexander and Wendell Bailey for the USA Maryland State Heavyweight Title.

Sports Illustrated ranked Chaplin sixth in its 1980 unofficial ranking of promising heavyweights when he was 29. His ambition was to be known as "the master boxer" of all time.

Chaplin lost a 10-round decision to Gerrie Coetzee at the first boxing card held at the Aloha Stadium in the "Duel in the Sun" billed fight in 1981. It was televised as a CBS Sports Spectacular and had 2,400 fans in attendance.

Greg Page defeated Chaplin twice. First in 1980 by majority decision. It was the first time an opponent had gone the distance with Page. The second time was a split decision loss, in 1981, for the USBA Heavyweight Title broadcast on ABC's Wide World of Sports. Although most fans felt Chaplin was winning the fight, the judges scored it much closer receiving a round of boos when the decision was announced. Chaplin followed this fight taking on Michael Dokes, ranked second by the WBC, for a unanimous loss with scorecards 49-44, 47-43 and 48-43 for Dokes.

In a March 1, 1983 bout, Chaplin scored a seventh-round disqualification win over Earnie Shavers, due to low blows. The following year, Chaplin fought Tom Ruffhouse Fischer for Baltimore trainer Mack Lewis's Mark Mitchell Boxing Benefit, which raised $5000 towards Mitchell's liver transplant.

Chaplin recognized towards the end of his career that many viewed him as a tune up fighter, a non-threatening, non-puncher with a soft touch. Many opponents took for granted his soft-spoken natural timidity. His style lacked an intimidation factor or an instinctual pursuit of finishing blows. At the age of 32, for a $75,000 guarantee, Chaplin challenged Gerry Cooney in a 10-round fight at the Arizona Veterans Memorial Coliseum, televised live on cable syndication across thirty states. At 215 pounds, Chaplin gave up a seventeen pound and nine-inch reach advantage to his 6-foot-7 opponent. In the second round, Cooney landed a solid left to the midsection, then a left to the chin followed by a flurry of uncontested punches for a technical knockout with 10 seconds left in the round. Wilford Scypion and Murray Sutherland fought on the undercard for the super middleweight title.

His final fight, for a $5000 purse, was a knockout loss to Jesse Ferguson on August 1, 1987 at the Las Vegas Hilton Center.
