= Nick Wells =

American boxer (born 1951)

Personal information
- Height: 5 ft 10 in (178 cm)

Boxing career
- Stance: southpaw
Medal record
Men's amateur boxing
Representing the United States
World Military Championships
| Gold medal – first place | 1972 Treviso | Heavyweight |

Nick Wells (born February 11, 1951) is a retired heavyweight boxer. He was selected a member of the All-American AAU boxing team for 1973, and was named the top heavyweight amateur boxer in the nation in 1973 by the National AAU Boxing Committee.

== Amateur career ==
Wells was a member of the U.S. Air Force, serving at Hamilton AFB in California, and already the four-time All-Air Force boxing champion when he won the 1972 U.S. Amateur heavyweight championship. In that year, he knocked out future WBC and IBF heavyweight champion Larry Holmes twice. The first time was in the 3rd round of a National Amateur Athletic Union tournament; later that year, in the US Olympic Trials, he knocked Holmes out in the first round. He went on to face 1971 US Amateur heavyweight champion Duane Bobick in the finals of the Olympic Trials, where he broke Bobick's nose early in the fight and appeared to be on his way to representing the United States in the Olympics. But Wells had suffered a head wound before the fight at his hotel, and the fight was stopped by the referee when it began to bleed profusely. Bobick went on to lose to Cuban heavyweight and eventual gold medal winner Teofilo Stevenson in the Olympic quarterfinals.

One of the most popular amateur boxers in Texas during the 1970s, Wells was a five-time Fort Worth Golden Gloves champion and a two-time Star-telegram Texas State Golden Gloves champion. Three-time Texas state champion, in 1969, 1970, 1971. Five time all air force champion, in 1972, 1973, 1974, 1975, 1976. Two-time interservice champion in 1973, 1975. Three-time interservice runner up in 1972, 1974, 1976. Two-time Nevada state golden gloves champion in 1972, 1973. He was the 1972 National AAU Champion, as well as the Western Hemisphere Champion in 1972 or 1973. He also held the titles of World Military Champion (CISM games in 1973) and Texas state champion, in 1971.

Duane Bobick said Wells was the biggest challenge on his way to winning the Pan American gold medal.

=== Highlights ===
Texas State Golden Gloves, Fort Worth, Texas, March 1969:

- Finals: Defeated James Helwig KO 2

National Golden Gloves, Municipal Auditorium, Kansas City, Missouri, March 1969:

- 1/8: Defeated Patrick Stewart KO 1 (0:48)
- 1/4: Lost to Ernie Shaver by decision

National Golden Gloves, Convention Hall, Las Vegas, Nevada, March 1970:

- 1/16: Defeated Mike Duenas KO 1
- 1/8: Defeated n/a KO
- 1/4: Lost to Ronald Lyle by decision

Pan Am Trials, Fort Bragg, North Carolina, June 1971:

- Finals: Lost to Duane Bobick by split decision, 2–3

National Golden Gloves, Minneapolis, Minnesota, March 1972:

- 1/2: Lost to Duane Bobick TKO 3 (Wells was given a standing eight count in the 1st rd)

Interservice Championships, April 1972:

- Finals: Lost to Duane Bobick by decision

(gold) National Championships, Las Vegas, Nevada, April 1972:

- Finals: Defeated LeRoy Jones TKO 3

(gold) World Military Championships, Treviso, Italy, June 1972:

- Finals: Defeated Guglielmo Spinello (Italy) KO 1

Olympic Trials, Fort Worth, Texas, July 1972:

- 1/4: Defeated John Hudson KO 1
- 1/2: Defeated Larry Holmes TKO 1
- Finals: Lost to Duane Bobick RSCI 3

USA–England Duals, Felt Forum, New York City, January 1973:

- Defeated Les McGowan (England) KO 1 (0:24)

USA–USSR Duals, Caesars Palace, Las Vegas, Nevada, January 1973:

- Defeated Yuri Nesterov (Soviet Union) KO 1

National Golden Gloves, Memorial Auditorium, Lowell, Massachusetts, March 1973:

- 1/16: Defeated Joe Jones by decision
- 1/8: Defeated Lammar Robinson KO 1
- 1/4: Defeated LeRoy Jones by unanimous decision, 5–0
- 1/2: Lost to John Hudson KO 1

USA–Poland Duals, West Patterson, New York, April 1973:

- Defeated Lucjan Trela (Poland) TKO 3

USA–FRG Duals, Hempstead, New York, August 1973:

- Lost to Peter Hussing (West Germany) KO 1

National Championships, Knoxville, Tennessee, June 1974:

- 1/2: Lost to Dwayne Bonds by decision

Wells compiled an amateur record of 189–18 with 110 knockouts, 72 of them in the first round.

== Professional career ==
Wells declined an opportunity to be trained by legendary trainer and manager Lou Duva in New Jersey, opting instead to train and fight out of his hometown of Fort Worth, Texas. He compiled a professional record of 10 - 3 before taking a job with the Fort Worth Fire Department in 1978, in order to support his son Nickolas. He continued his professional boxing career, but lost the Texas State Heavyweight Title match to Roy Wallace in his first bout after becoming a firefighter. He went 3 - 4 from that point, his last two fights ending in knockout losses to heavyweight contenders Eddie "The Animal" Lopez and Tony "The Tongan Torpedo" Fulilangi. He retired from boxing in 1983 with a professional record of 13–8, although some accounts list his record at 15–8.

== Professional boxing record ==
| 23 fights | 16 wins | 7 losses |
|---|---|---|
| By knockout | 15 | 5 |
| By decision | 1 | 2 |

| Preceded by Duane Bobick | United States Amateur Heavyweight Champion; 1972 | Succeeded by James Chapman |
