= Oliver Wright (boxer) =

Jamaican boxer (1947–2018)

Personal information
- Born: 12 June 1947 Mandeville, Colony of Jamaica, British Empire
- Died: 28 December 2018 (aged 71) Atlanta, Georgia, United States

Sport
- Sport: Boxing
Medal record
Men's amateur boxing
Representing Jamaica
British Commonwealth Games
Silver medal – second place	1970 Edinburgh	Light-heavyweight
Central American and Caribbean Games
Bronze medal – third place	1970 Panama City	Light-heavyweight

Oliver Dinsdale Wright (12 June 1947 – 28 December 2018) was a Jamaican boxer. He competed at the 1968 Summer Olympics in the middleweight category and the 1972 Summer Olympics in the light-heavyweight category. As a light-heavyweight, Wright won a silver medal at the 1970 British Commonwealth Games and a bronze medal at the 1970 Central American and Caribbean Games.

During Wright's professional career, which lasted from 1973 to 1981, he fought the likes of Larry Holmes, Tim Witherspoon, Earnie Shavers and Oscar Bonavena in the heavyweight class. Wright had a professional record of 16-16-1.
