= Earnie Shavers =

American boxer (1944–2022)

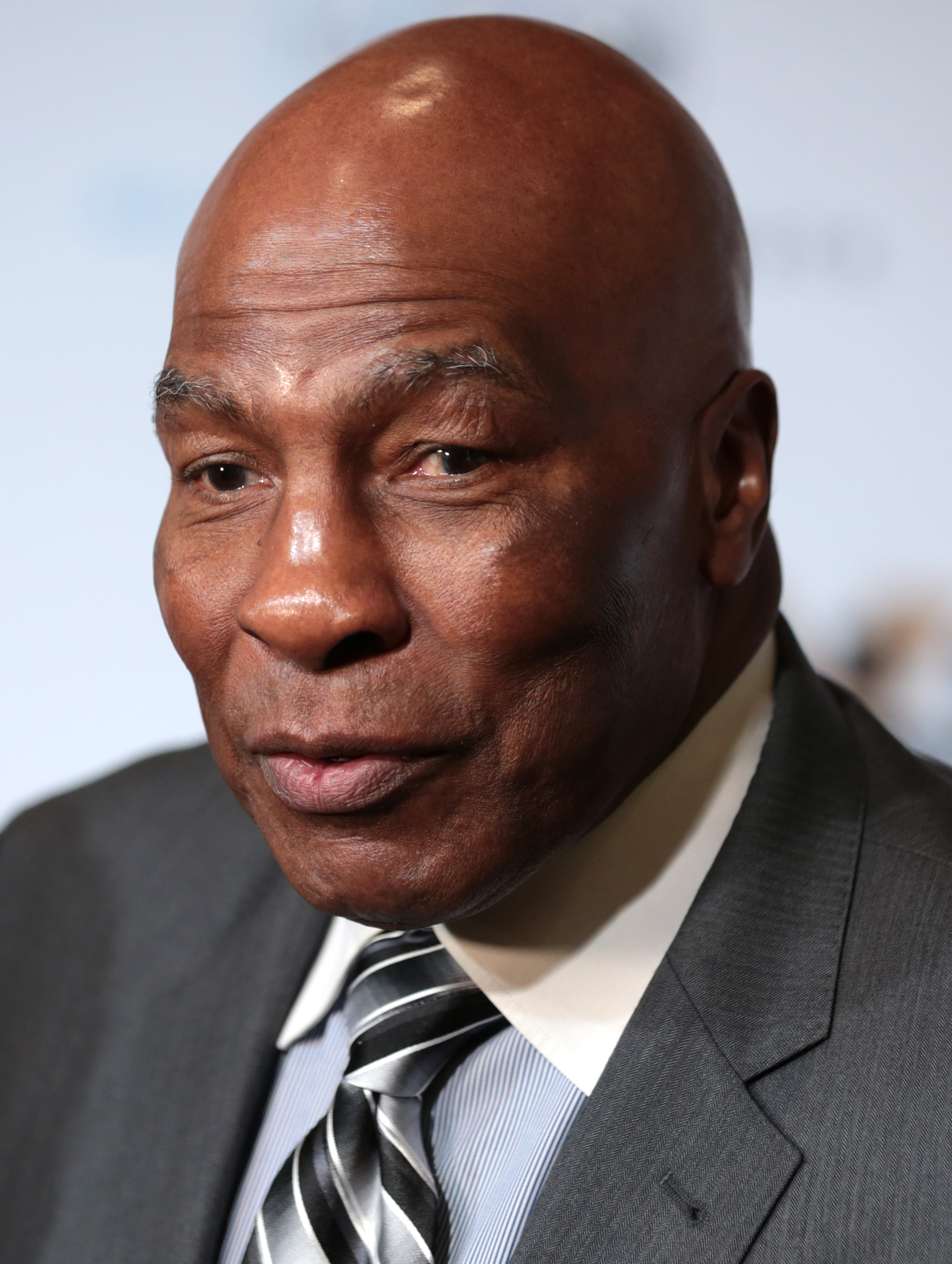
- Shavers in 2017

Personal information
- Nicknames: The Black Destroyer; The Acorn
- Born: Earnie Dee Shaver; August 31, 1944 Garland, Alabama, U.S.
- Died: September 1, 2022 (aged 78) Virginia, U.S.
- Height: 6 ft (183 cm)
- Weight: Heavyweight

Boxing career
- Reach: 79 in (201 cm)
- Stance: Orthodox

Boxing record
- Total fights: 91
- Wins: 76
- Win by KO: 70
- Losses: 14
- Draws: 1

Earnie Dee Shaver (August 31, 1944 – September 1, 2022), best known as Earnie Shavers, was an American professional boxer who competed between 1969 and 1995. A two-time world heavyweight championship challenger, he is most famous as one of the hardest punchers in heavyweight boxing history. He scored 70 knockout wins, including 23 in the first round, for a 76.9% overall knockout rate.

Shavers twice unsuccessfully challenged for the heavyweight championship, losing to Muhammad Ali in 1977 by a 15-round unanimous decision and to Larry Holmes in 1979 by TKO in round 11. He hurt Ali in the second round and knocked down Holmes in the seventh round. Shavers defeated former world champions Vicente Rondón, Jimmy Ellis, and Ken Norton, as well as three-time European heavyweight champion Joe Bugner and top heavyweight contender Jimmy Young.

In 2001, Shavers released an autobiography, Welcome to the Big Time. After retiring from boxing, he continued to attend boxing events as a special guest, autograph signer, and motivational speaker.

== Early life ==
Earnie Dee Shaver was born on August 31, 1944, in Garland, Alabama. He was one of nine children born to Curtis and Willie Belle Shaver, and worked on a cotton farm with his family. Shavers credited the strenuous labor on the farm for helping to build his muscular physique and formidable strength. While he was still a boy, his family was forced to flee their home after his father was threatened by the Ku Klux Klan, over money owed for a mule.

The family moved to Youngstown, Ohio. Shavers attended Newton Falls High School, where he excelled in track and football. He worked at the nearby General Motors assembly plant in Lordstown.

== Amateur career ==
Shavers started boxing at the age of 22. Before turning professional, he had a short but notable amateur career, winning the 1969 National AAU heavyweight title.

In March 1969, National Golden Gloves director Tony Mange said Shavers "carries a hefty punch". He had nine straight knockout wins before he was himself knocked out by the 230-pound (104 kg) West German Horst Koschemann.

=== Highlights ===
(gold) Cleveland Golden Gloves, Cleveland, Ohio, 1968:

- Finals: Defeated Mike Boswell

National Golden Gloves, Salt Lake City, Utah, March 1968:

- 1/8: Defeated Dave Foley
- 1/4: Defeated Tommy Garrett by decision
- 1/2: Lost to Frank Steele TKO 3

United States National Championships, Toledo, Ohio, April 1968:

- 1/8: Lost to Chuck Haynes TKO

National Golden Gloves, Municipal Auditorium, Kansas City, Missouri, March 1969:

- 1/8: Defeated Bernard Roberts KO 1 (1:05)
- 1/4: Defeated Nick Wells by decision
- 1/2: Lost to Ron Draper by decision

(gold) United States National Championships, San Diego, California, April 1969:

- 1/8: Defeated Wayne McGee KO
- 1/4: Defeated Mose Hill Jr. KO 2
- 1/2: Defeated Otis Evans KO
- Finals: Defeated Charles Elder TKO 1 (2:15)

USA–FRG Duals, Cincinnati Gardens, Cincinnati, Ohio, June 1969:

- Lost to Horst Koschemann (West Germany) TKO 2 (1:30)

Ohio State Fair Amateur Boxing Tournament, State Fairgrounds, Columbus, Ohio, August 1969:

National Team Selection Eliminator, Fort Campbell, Kentucky, October 1969:

- Lost to Charles Elder by decision

Shavers posted a 20–6 amateur record as a heavyweight and recorded 14 knockouts (with half of those losses also by knockout.)

== Professional career ==
=== Early bouts ===
Known as the "Black Destroyer", Shavers won 44 of his first 47 fights by knockout; mostly against unremarkable opposition. This included 27 consecutive knockouts, of which 20 were in the first round. He suffered setbacks with a unanimous decision loss in his 3rd bout to Stan Johnson, who was a replacement opponent for Wayne West, and a 5th-round KO loss to then undefeated Ron Stander.

He began to rise to the upper ranks of the heavyweight division after he hired Cleveland-based promoter Don King to be his manager. His wins included one over a novice Jimmy Young who later became a world championship contender. Stepping up the class of his opposition, he came to public prominence with a first-round KO of one time WBA heavyweight champion Jimmy Ellis. His progress was halted when he was KO'd in the first round by Jerry Quarry, which was followed by another loss to a journeyman Bob Stallings. Shavers then had a thunderous match with hard hitting Ron Lyle but was stopped after 6 brutal rounds. He then knocked out hard hitter Howard Smith and beat powerful prospect Roy Williams in a brutal back and forward battle in which Shavers was nearly knocked out, a match Shavers maintained was one of the toughest of his career.

=== Fighting champions ===
==== Shavers vs Ali ====
Shavers fought Muhammad Ali at Madison Square Garden on September 29, 1977. Coming into the bout, Shavers had a record of 54–5–1, with 52 knockouts. Ali nicknamed Shavers "The Acorn" because of his shaved bald head. The fight was shown in prime time broadcast television by NBC, which rarely did prime time fights (ABC tended to get the Ali fights) and had the judges' scoring announced after each round to help avoid any controversial decision. Ali's cornerman Angelo Dundee asked Baltimore matchmaker Eddie Hrica to watch the broadcast in the dressing room and signal on the scoring. In the second round, Shavers hurt Ali with an overhand right. Ali play-acted that he was seriously hurt, and Shavers hesitated. On the scorecard they exchanged rounds. Ali won the fifth decisively. By the 12th round, the almost 36 year old Ali, just had to survive the last three rounds to win. Shavers, whose stamina was suspect before the fight, came alive in the 13th round. In the 14th, he battered Ali about the ring. Before the 15th, according to Sports Illustrated boxing writer Pat Putnam, "Ali was on very wobbly legs." Realizing Ali needed to last three more minutes, Dundee told him, "You don't look so good. You better go out and take this round." In a furious final round, the two men tagged each other, but Ali closed strongly, nearly dropping Shavers in the last 20 seconds. He won a unanimous decision. The next day, Garden matchmaker Teddy Brenner encouraged Ali to retire by stating the Garden would never make another offer to host an Ali fight. Brenner also thought that Shavers deserved the nod against Ali. The fight made the cover of Sports Illustrated, with "ALI'S DESPERATE HOUR" featuring a photograph of Shavers scoring with an overhand right. Ali's fight doctor Ferdie Pacheco also urged Ali to retire after noting the punishment Ali had absorbed against Shavers. Ali later said Shavers was the hardest puncher he ever faced, comparing him favorably to Joe Frazier and George Foreman. Ali also stated that "Earnie hit me so hard, it shook my kinfolk back in Africa" - a quip Ali had previously used to describe other hard-hitting opponents.

==== Shavers vs Holmes ====
Shavers, being the No.3 WBC contender, then fought No. 4 WBC contender Larry Holmes at Caesars Palace for an elimination bout for the WBC world heavyweight title, the winner to face WBC heavyweight champion Ken Norton. The fight happened at Paradise, Nevada on March 25, 1978. Holmes won by a 12-round unanimous decision.

==== Shavers vs Norton ====
In a mandatory title challenge eliminator Earnie Shavers knocked out former champion Ken Norton in the first round. The victory is widely regarded as the best win of his career and earned him a bout with WBC champion Larry Holmes.

==== Shavers vs Holmes II ====
Shavers and Holmes fought once again on September 29, 1979, again at Caesars Palace, this time for the WBC title. Shavers knocked Holmes down in round seven and apparently in round nine (the referee ruled it a slip). After Shavers took a series of punches in the eleventh round and seemed defenseless, the referee stopped the fight, awarding a TKO win for Larry Holmes. Holmes, known for his ability to take a punch, later said that Shavers's knockdown blow in the seventh round was the hardest he had ever taken in his career.

=== Later career ===
The Holmes rematch was the last big fight for Shavers. In 1980, in a wild slugfest he was stopped in the eighth round by durable prospect Randall "Tex" Cobb. Prior to the Cobb fight, Shavers had undergone eye surgery for a detached retina. (Since eye surgery was not nearly as refined then as it is today, the majority of boxers retired for good after that kind of injury. In the words of Duane Ford of the Nevada Athletic Commission, a detached retina for a boxer was like an AIDS diagnosis). Shavers had not fully recovered from the surgery when he came back for the Cobb fight. He never again fought for the world title. In 1982 he fought Joe Bugner, also on the comeback trail. Bugner was knocked down in the first, and was stopped by cuts in the second round.

Shavers continued to fight professionally for several years, retiring in 1995 after losing to Brian Yates. Many thought he should have retired after his upset loss to lower contender Bernardo Mercado. Shavers had a similar retinal eye injury as Sugar Ray Leonard.

=== Comeback ===
Shavers attempted two abbreviated comebacks - a fight in 1987, and two in 1995, in the second of which he was KO'd by Brian Yates in round 2. After this loss, Shavers retired for good.

Shavers has been named among the top-10 punchers in boxing history by The Ring and others.

Shavers finished his career in 1995 with a record of 76 wins (70 by knockout, 23 inside the first round, with 52 in the first 3 rounds), 14 losses (7 by knockout), and 1 draw.

== Fighting style ==
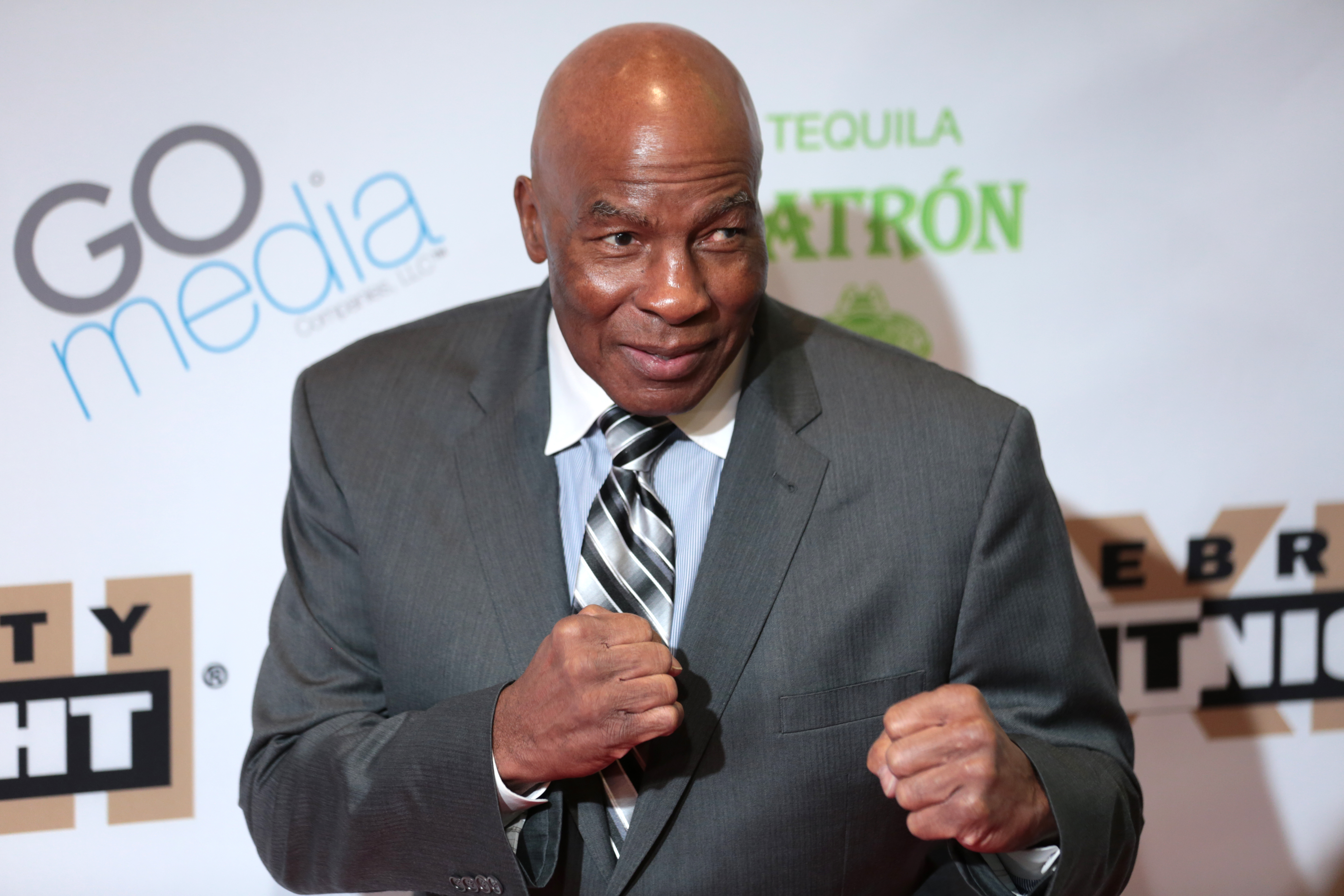
Shavers at Celebrity Fight Night in Phoenix, 2017

Shavers was an exceptionally heavy puncher who stalked his opponents, setting them up for his thunderous right, which was responsible for many of his knockouts, although Angelo Dundee in a Sports Illustrated mid-1970s article said "He can get you out of there with any kind of shot", referring to Shavers's ability to inflict damage with a left hook, right cross or right uppercut. Several boxers famous for their tough chins had fallen to Shavers's punches, including Bugner and Ellis who were felled by his uppercut.

Shavers would throw punches against any legal area he could reach, exposed or covered, relying on his tremendous power to wear down his opponents and exploiting any opening. His fighting stance produced a short and powerful image. His chin was his weakness. He could however "box" as well as slug. Notably, he injured his right hand early in a 10-round match against rated craftsman Henry Clark and responded with a strong jabbing performance to beat Clark, himself noted for his jabbing ability, on points.

=== Video and book ===
Shavers published a video of highlights of his career in 1992 titled Earnie D. Shavers, The hardest one-punch hitter, and later an autobiography.

== Life after boxing ==
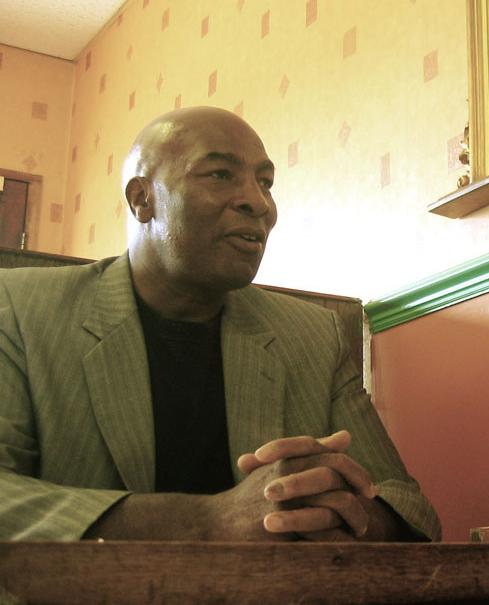
Shavers in 2005

Shavers retired in 1983 after retinal problems were discovered. After retirement, he became an ordained Christian minister and moved to Phoenix, where he preached for many years. He moved to England to pastor a church there in the early 2000s. He was on the Benny Hinn TV show several times.

During the early 1980s while preparing for the feature film Rocky III, Sylvester Stallone explored the possibility of using a real heavyweight boxer in the role of James "Clubber" Lang by inviting Earnie Shavers to spar with him. Shavers initially refused to hit Stallone with anything other than a soft jab. This frustrated Stallone, who asked Shavers, "C'mon Earnie, show me something real." Earnie responded by punching him once near the liver, forcing an immediate retirement; Stallone later said: "that nearly killed me. I went straight to the men's room and threw up". However, according to Rhonda Young, the film's casting director, the reason why he was eventually not chosen for the part is that his voice was too high-pitched and not menacing enough (Joe Frazier was also considered).

Shavers visited Ali several times and he said that he, Ali, and George Foreman became very good friends over the years. Foreman, when asked about toughest and hardest punching opponent he ever met in the ring, said:

Foreman: You only meet three genuine punchers throughout your career: Gerry Cooney, Ron Lyle and Cleveland Williams, and they hit so hard that it vibrates your body even if you block, it just goes right through you.

Letterman: What about Earnie Shavers?

Foreman: I never fought Earnie Shavers. Thank goodness.

Shavers accepted the invitation of the Full Gospel Business Men's Fellowship International to preach at the 2002 Commonwealth Games in Manchester.

He also worked in Liverpool in the UK, as head of security at Hannah's bar, where he was very much respected. Until 2009, he worked at Yates' Wine Lodge in Liverpool "meeting and greeting". On occasion Shavers was a troubleshooting referee in professional wrestling after his retirement.

He was also a Patron of The Shannon Bradshaw Trust, a children's charity based in Warrington, Cheshire, helping children with life-threatening conditions, and their families.

Shavers spoke to pupils at Barr Beacon Language College in Walsall. He also gave a speech on 26 February 2008 at The Streetly School in Walsall, which was based upon helping kids make the right decisions in life.

== Personal life ==
Shavers was married to his high school sweetheart, Laverne Payne. They had five daughters, Tamara Shavers, Cynthia Shavers, Catherine Shavers-Long, Carla Shavers, and Amy Shavers-Perkins. He also has four daughters and one son from other relationships. He had 24 grandchildren and four great-grandchildren.

Shavers made a guest appearance on the Irish TV program The Late Late Show hosted by Ron Lyle where the two fighters discussed their previous bout that had happened a month earlier. Shavers was a frequent visitor to the pub Roddy Bolands in Dublin. There is a signed picture of Shavers drinking a pint of Guinness on the wall there.

== Death ==
Shavers died at the age of 78 on September 1, 2022, from a short illness at his daughter's home in Virginia.

== Professional boxing record ==
91 fights	76 wins	14 losses
By knockout	70	7
By decision	6	6
By disqualification	0	1
Draws	1	

No.	Result	Record	Opponent	Type	Round, time	Date	Location	Notes
91	Loss	76–14–1	Brian Yates	KO	2 (10), 2:49	Nov 24, 1995	Ho-Chunk Casino, Wisconsin Dells, Wisconsin, U.S.	
90	Win	76–13–1	Brian Morgan	MD	8	Sep 19, 1995	Georgetowne Club, Omaha, Nebraska, U.S.	
89	Win	75–13–1	Larry Sims	KO	2 (10), 1:30	May 16, 1987	Technical College Gymnasium, Cincinnati, Ohio, U.S.	
88	Loss	74–13–1	George Chaplin	DQ	9 (10), 2:41	Mar 1, 1983	Civic Center, Baltimore, Maryland, U.S.	Shavers disqualified for low blows
87	Win	74–12–1	Phil Clinard	TKO	5 (10)	Feb 18, 1983	Municipal Auditorium, Pensacola, U.S.	
86	Win	73–12–1	Rahim Muhammad	PTS	10	Jan 29, 1983	El Paso, Texas, U.S.	
85	Win	72–12–1	Tony Perea	RTD	6 (10), 3:00	Nov 5, 1982	El Paso, Texas, U.S.	
84	Win	71–12–1	Al Jones	KO	3 (8)	Dec 13, 1982	Assembly Center, Tulsa, Oklahoma, U.S.	
83	Win	70–12–1	Phil Clinard	TKO	2 (8)	Oct 14, 1982	Duke's Country, Tulsa, Oklahoma, U.S.	
82	Win	69–12–1	Chuck Gardner	KO	2 (10), 2:07	Sep 5, 1982	Wales, Wisconsin, U.S.	
81	Loss	68–12–1	Walter Santemore	UD	10	Aug 17, 1982	Blackham Coliseum, Lafayette, Louisiana, U.S.	
80	Win	68–11–1	Billy Joe Thomas	KO	5 (10)	Jun 22, 1982	Astroarena, Houston, Texas, U.S.	
79	Loss	67–11–1	James Tillis	UD	10	Jun 11, 1982	Caesars Palace, Paradise, Nevada, U.S.	
78	Win	67–10–1	Danny Sutton	TKO	7 (10)	May 15, 1982	USS Yorktown (CV-10), Charleston, South Carolina, U.S.	
77	Win	66–10–1	Joe Bugner	TKO	2 (10), 2:14	May 8, 1982	Reunion Arena, Dallas, Texas, U.S.	
76	Win	65–10–1	Ali Haakim	PTS	10	Apr 22, 1982	Grand Traverse Hilton, Traverse City, Michigan, U.S.	
75	Win	64–10–1	Jeff Sims	KO	5 (10), 1:34	Dec 11, 1981	Queen Elizabeth Sports Centre, Nassau, Bahamas	
74	Win	63–10–1	Mike Rodgers	KO	2 (10), 1:38	Sep 9, 1981	Civic Center, Lansing, Michigan, U.S.	
73	Win	62–10–1	Terry Mims	KO	2 (10), 1:35	Jul 29, 1981	Civic Center, Saginaw, Michigan, U.S.	
72	Win	61–10–1	Ted Wadkins	TKO	2 (10), 1:30	Oct 17, 1980	Auditorium, West Palm Beach, Florida, U.S.	
71	Loss	60–10–1	Randall Cobb	TKO	8 (10), 2:19	Aug 2, 1980	Joe Louis Arena, Detroit, Michigan, U.S.	
70	Win	60–9–1	Leroy Boone	UD	10	Jun 14, 1980	Riverfront Coliseum, Cincinnati, Ohio, U.S.	
69	Loss	59–9–1	Bernardo Mercado	TKO	7 (10), 0:41	Mar 8, 1980	The Great Gorge Playboy Club Hotel, Vernon Township, New Jersey, U.S.	
68	Loss	59–8–1	Larry Holmes	TKO	11 (15), 2:00	Sep 28, 1979	Caesars Palace, Paradise, Nevada, U.S.	For WBC heavyweight title
67	Win	59–7–1	Eddie Parotte	TKO	3 (10)	May 25, 1979	Coliseum, Richfield, Ohio, U.S.	
66	Win	58–7–1	Ken Norton	KO	1 (12), 1:58	Mar 23, 1979	Las Vegas Hilton, Winchester, Nevada, U.S.	
65	Win	57–7–1	Harold Carter	KO	3 (10)	Dec 4, 1978	Civic Center, Saginaw, Michigan, U.S.	
64	Win	56–7–1	John Girowski	KO	4 (10), 1:48	Oct 9, 1978	Coliseum, Hampton, Virginia, U.S.	
63	Win	55–7–1	Harry Terrell	RTD	1 (10), 3:00	Jul 20, 1978	The Dome Civic Center, Virginia Beach, Virginia, U.S.	
62	Loss	54–7–1	Larry Holmes	UD	12	Mar 25, 1978	Caesars Palace, Paradise, Nevada, U.S.	
61	Loss	54–6–1	Muhammad Ali	UD	15	Sep 29, 1977	Madison Square Garden, New York City, New York, U.S.	For WBA, WBC, and The Ring heavyweight titles
60	Win	54–5–1	Howard Smith	KO	2 (10), 2:18	Apr 16, 1977	The Aladdin, Paradise, Nevada, U.S.	
59	Win	53–5–1	Roy Williams	KO	10 (10), 2:46	Dec 11, 1976	The Aladdin, Paradise, Nevada, U.S.	
58	Win	52–5–1	Henry Clark	TKO	2 (10), 2:19	Sep 28, 1976	Yankee Stadium, New York City, New York, U.S.	
57	Win	51–5–1	Henry Clark	PTS	10	Mar 28, 1976	Pavillon de Paris, Paris, France	
56	Win	50–5–1	Tommy Howard	KO	3 (10), 2:00	Nov 13, 1975	Howard Johnson's, Monroeville, Pennsylvania, U.S.	
55	Loss	49–5–1	Ron Lyle	KO	6 (12), 0:47	Sep 13, 1975	Coliseum, Denver, Colorado, U.S.	
54	Win	49–4–1	Oliver Wright	TKO	3 (10), 1:55	May 8, 1975	Steelworkers Hall, Baltimore, Maryland, U.S.	
53	Win	48–4–1	Rochell Norris	TKO	10 (10), 0:31	Apr 9, 1975	Broome County Veterans Memorial Arena, Binghamton, New York, U.S.	
52	Win	47–4–1	Leon Shaw	KO	1 (10), 2:55	Feb 11, 1975	Sports Stadium, Orlando, Florida, U.S.	
51	Draw	46–4–1	Jimmy Young	SD	10	Nov 26, 1974	Capital Centre, Landover, Maryland, U.S.	
50	Loss	46–4	Bob Stallings	UD	10	Nov 4, 1974	Felt Forum, New York City, New York, U.S.	
49	Win	46–3	Roy Wallace	KO	1 (10), 2:11	May 16, 1974	Civic Auditorium, San Jose, California, U.S.	
48	Loss	45–3	Jerry Quarry	TKO	1 (10), 2:21	Dec 14, 1973	Madison Square Garden, New York City, New York, U.S.	
47	Win	45–2	Jimmy Ellis	KO	1 (10), 2:39	Jun 18, 1973	Madison Square Garden, New York City, New York, U.S.	
46	Win	44–2	Harold Carter	KO	1 (10), 2:10	May 12, 1973	Windsor Arena, Windsor, Ontario, Canada	
45	Win	43–2	Jimmy Young	TKO	3 (10), 2:59	Feb 19, 1973	Spectrum, Philadelphia, Pennsylvania, U.S.	
44	Win	42–2	Leroy Caldwell	KO	2 (10), 2:00	Oct 25, 1972	High School Gym, Newton Falls, Ohio, U.S.	
43	Win	41–2	A J Staples	TKO	1 (10), 2:12	Sep 19, 1972	Moonlight Gardens Ballroom, Canton, Ohio, U.S.	
42	Win	40–2	Vicente Rondón	UD	10	Aug 26, 1972	Memorial Auditorium, Canton, Ohio, U.S.	
41	Win	39–2	Lou Bailey	KO	2 (10), 1:07	May 5, 1972	Armory, Akron, Ohio, U.S.	
40	Win	38–2	Bob Felstein	TKO	5 (10), 2:38	Apr 22, 1972	Fieldhouse, Struthers, Ohio, U.S.	
39	Win	37–2	Charley Polite	KO	3 (10), 0:50	Apr 6, 1972	Packard Music Hall, Warren, Ohio, U.S.	
38	Win	36–2	Elgie Walters	KO	2 (10), 0:20	Feb 15, 1972	Beaumont, Texas, U.S.	
37	Win	35–2	Ted Gullick	KO	6 (10)	Feb 1, 1972	Packard Music Hall, Warren, Ohio, U.S.	
36	Win	34–2	Del Morris	KO	3 (10), 2:40	Nov 28, 1971	Bryant, South Dakota, U.S.	
35	Win	33–2	Cleo Daniels	KO	2 (10)	Nov 23, 1971	Packard Music Hall, Warren, Ohio, U.S.	
34	Win	32–2	Elmo Henderson	KO	4 (10), 2:35	Oct 28, 1971	Sahara Tahoe, Stateline, Nevada, U.S.	
33	Win	31–2	Charlie Boston	KO	2 (10), 1:55	Oct 16, 1971	Dean Chance Gymnasium, Akron, Ohio, U.S.	
32	Win	30–2	Pat Duncan	KO	5 (10)	Sep 28, 1971	Primadonna, Reno, Nevada, U.S.	Won vacant Nevada State heavyweight title
31	Win	29–2	Richard Pittman	KO	1 (10)	Aug 11, 1971	Silver Slipper, Paradise, Nevada, U.S.	
30	Win	28–2	Bill McMurray	KO	1 (10), 2:56	Jul 13, 1971	Sahara Tahoe, Stateline, Nevada, U.S.	
29	Win	27–2	Bill Hardney	KO	1 (10), 1:52	Jun 29, 1971	Western Reserve Field, Warren, Ohio, U.S.	
28	Win	26–2	Chuck Leslie	KO	10 (10), 1:15	Jun 10, 1971	Sahara Tahoe, Stateline, Nevada, U.S.	
27	Win	25–2	Willie Johnson	TKO	4 (10), 0:33	Apr 24, 1971	Curtis Hixon Hall, Tampa, Florida, U.S.	
26	Win	24–2	Mac Harrison	KO	2 (10), 1:16	Apr 21, 1971	Dean Chance Gymnasium, Akron, Ohio, U.S.	
25	Win	23–2	Young Agabab	KO	1 (10)	Mar 24, 1971	Silver Slipper, Paradise, Nevada, U.S.	
24	Win	22–2	Steve Carter	TKO	1 (10)	Mar 3, 1971	Silver Slipper, Paradise, Nevada, U.S.	
23	Win	21–2	Dick Gosha	TKO	5 (10), 2:38	Feb 17, 1971	Armory, Akron, Ohio, U.S.	
22	Win	20–2	Johnny Mac	KO	3 (10)	Feb 3, 1971	Silver Slipper, Paradise, Nevada, U.S.	
21	Win	19–2	Nat Shaver	KO	1 (6)	Jan 15, 1971	Convention Center, Miami Beach, Florida, U.S.	
20	Win	18–2	Lee Estes	KO	2 (8)	Jan 6, 1971	Silver Slipper, Paradise, Nevada, U.S.	
19	Win	17–2	Bunky Akins	KO	1 (6), 0:59	Dec 7, 1970	Madison Square Garden, New York City, New York, U.S.	
18	Win	16–2	Johnny Mac	TKO	4 (8)	Nov 18, 1970	Fitch High School Gym, Austintown, Ohio, U.S.	
17	Win	15–2	Johnny Hudgins	KO	1 (6), 0:55	Oct 14, 1970	Moonlight Gardens Ballroom, Canton, Ohio, U.S.	
16	Win	14–2	Don Branch	KO	1 (6)	Sep 12, 1970	Cooper Stadium, Columbus, Ohio, U.S.	
15	Win	13–2	Jim Daniels	KO	1 (10)	Aug 29, 1970	Fitch High School Gym, Austintown, Ohio, U.S.	
14	Loss	12–2	Ron Stander	KO	5 (8), 0:52	May 11, 1970	Civic Auditorium, Omaha, Nebraska, U.S.	
13	Win	12–1	Frank Smith	TKO	4 (6)	Apr 14, 1970	Moonlight Gardens Ballroom, Canton, Ohio, U.S.	
12	Win	11–1	Ron Asher	KO	1 (8), 0:58	Mar 23, 1970	Fitch High School Gym, Austintown, Ohio, U.S.	
11	Win	10–1	Art Miller	TKO	1 (6), 2:41	Mar 10, 1970	Moonlight Gardens Ballroom, Canton, Ohio, U.S.	
10	Win	9–1	Abe Brown	TKO	5 (6), 1:35	Jan 27, 1970	Sports Stadium, Orlando, Florida, U.S.	
9	Win	8–1	Joe Byrd	TKO	3 (6), 1:35	Jan 24, 1970	Memorial Auditorium, Canton, Ohio, U.S.	
8	Win	7–1	Abe Brown	TKO	1 (6), 1:44	Jan 7, 1970	Armory, Akron, Ohio, U.S.	
7	Win	6–1	Gene Idelette	TKO	2 (6)	Dec 23, 1969	Sports Stadium, Orlando, Florida, U.S.	
6	Win	5–1	Chico Froncano	KO	1 (4), 2:05	Dec 18, 1969	Memorial Auditorium, Canton, Ohio, U.S.	
5	Win	4–1	J. D. McCauley	KO	2 (4), 2:18	Dec 4, 1969	Armory, Akron, Ohio, U.S.	
4	Win	3–1	Lee Roy	KO	3 (6), 2:30	Nov 21, 1969	Municipal Auditorium, Rapid City, South Dakota, U.S.	
3	Loss	2–1	Stan Johnson	UD	4	Nov 13, 1969	Ice Arena, Seattle, Washington, U.S.	
2	Win	2–0	George Holden	KO	1 (6), 1:01	Nov 11, 1969	Sports Stadium, Orlando, Florida, U.S.	
1	Win	1–0	Silas Howell	TKO	1 (4), 2:05	Nov 6, 1969	Armory, Akron, Ohio, U.S.	

Sporting positions
Amateur boxing titles
Previous: George Foreman	U.S. heavyweight champion 1969	Next: Ron Lyle
Regional boxing titles
Inaugural champion	Nevada heavyweight champion September 28, 1971 – October 1978; Vacated	Vacant Title next held by Mike Weaver
