= Avenamar Peralta =

Argentine boxer (1943–2014)

Personal information
- Nationality: Argentinian
- Born: Ramón Avenamar Peralta; January 3, 1943 San Juan, San Juan Province, Argentina
- Died: October 13, 2014 (aged 71)
- Weight: Heavyweight; Light heavyweight

Boxing career
- Stance: Orthodox

Boxing record
- Total fights: 150
- Wins: 103
- Win by KO: 64
- Losses: 32
- Draws: 15

Ramón Avenamar Peralta (January 3, 1943 – October 13, 2014) was an Argentine professional boxer who fought 150 times and challenged for the European Boxing Union (EBU) light heavyweight title.

== Biography ==
Ramón Avenamar Peralta, mostly just known as Avenamar Peralta was born on January 3, 1943, in San Juan, Argentina. He resided in Quilmes, Argentina and is the younger brother of fellow Argentinian boxer and Heavyweight division contender Gregorio "Goyo" Peralta. After boxing, he has devoted his life to his wife Mercedes and father to Avenamar Jr., Marta and Patricia Pérez. Avenamar also earned Spanish citizenship.

== Amateur career ==
Peralta had an impressive background for his Amateur boxing career, having set a record of 61 wins with only 4 losses and 5 draws, he was defeated by: Luis Servioli in the Argentina Boxing Federation, Pedro Ruppel in Olavarría, Salvador Manganelli in Azul, Buenos Aires and "Quito" Torres in Loma Negra. In addition, Peralta was the national amateur middleweight champion in Mar del Plata back in 1961.

== Professional career ==
At the age of 21 on June 12, 1965, Avenamar Peralta made his debut against fellow debutant compatriot Raul Diaz in Azul, Buenos Aires, Argentina, who he beat via third-round TKO out of their eight-round scheduled bout. He would fight opponents with low competition and low profiles making him comprise a record of 36–0 with 3 draws with his most impressive win being a ninth-round knockout against compatriot Argentine Middleweight title-challenger Ignacio Magallanes. His first loss was to debut-loser Santos Gimenez who beat Peralta via Disqualification after Peralta hit Gimenez low, Peralta would avenge his loss on September 14, 1968, via DQ.

=== Argentine and South American light heavyweight champion ===
On November 23, 1968, Peralta challenged Argentinian and South American light heavyweight champion Miguel Angel Paez for the Argentinian light heavyweight title in Estadio Luna Park, Peralta became the national champion prevailing via Unanimous decision.

Peralta successfully defended the title against long-time rival Jose Menno on May 14, 1969, and was named the South American light heavyweight champion in October 1969 after Paez vacated title. His second successful defense was against future world champion Víctor Galíndez on November 29, 1970, however he would lose hold of the title via Points against Juan Aguilar on June 11, 1971, in Mendoza, Argentina.

On April 29, 1972, Peralta defeated his conqueror Juan Aguilar in a rematch where Peralta would make the first defense of his South American title and regained the Argentine National title in Estadio Luna Park, Buenos Aires. On September 2 the same year however, Peralta lost his Argentine title against Víctor Galíndez and next month, would lose his South American title to the same foe.

=== Move to Europe ===
==== West Germany ====
After losing to Raul Arturo Loyola via PTS, Peralta settled in Spain on February 1, however he more often fought in West Germany and made his Europe debut on March 2, 1973, in Berlin formerly surrounded by the Communist-counterpart East Germany against American "The Devil" Charley Green, Peralta won via PTS. Peralta would fight once at Spain on January 11, 1974, in Madrid where he beat Zairian Billy Suze, afterwards, Peralta went back to West Germany having three more bouts.

==== Austria ====
Peralta fought only twice in Austria, first was a second-round KO victory against Zairian journeyman Jean Tshikuna, the latter bout was a third-round TKO win against Englishman Maxie Smith.

==== Return to West Germany ====
On October 14, 1974, Peralta lost to Dutch Rudi Lubbers via disqualification, marking his first loss after 12 consecutive victories. Peralta returned to fight in West Germany on December 10, 1974, until January 16, 1976, in between those times, Peralta seldom fought in Austria, only fighting in Vienna Stadthalle.

From May 22, 1976, Peralta began fighting more Internationally, he lost to South African Pierre Fourie via PTS in Rand Stadium, Johannesburg, South Africa. On October 21, 1976, Peralta prevailed against Norwegian Harald Skog via eight-rounder PTS in Messehallen in Oslo, Norway, He won via DQ against Billy Aird in Caesar's Palace in Luton, England, drew with Ugandan Mustafa Wasajja in the Hall of Randers, Denmark and won via PTS against Hennie Thoonen in Sportpaleis Ahoy, Rotterdam, Netherlands.

==== Spain ====
Since February 17, 1978, Peralta became a Spain-based boxer after tying with Brit Tony Moore in Madrid. Soon afterwards, Peralta defeated two more opponents.

=== European light heavyweight title challenger ===
After 13 years of professional boxing, Peralta has composed an imposing record of 94–14–12 and challenged the reigning European light heavyweight champion Italian Aldo Traversaro on September 5, 1978, in Bibione, Veneto, Italy, the bout ending in a draw.

After failing to win the major title, Peralta started to fatigue, he mostly fought in Spain, but he fought in Italy on March 4 and April 27, 1979, where he lost both the bouts against former Italian National and subsequent European heavyweight champion Lorenzo Zanon and former Italian National and Leon Spinks-challenger Alfio Righetti. After a two-bouts losing streak, Peralta challenged the reigning Spanish heavyweight strap-holder Felipe Rodriguez in Pabellón Municipal de Deportes de Pontevedra, Peralta would be once more unfortunate losing via PTS.

==== Spanish light heavyweight champion ====
On August 8, 1980, Peralta won the vacant Spanish light heavyweight belt against Alejandro Cardoso via PTS in Campo del Gas, Madrid. Peralta defended the title on his next bout in a rematch against Cardoso where he again triumphed via PTS.

On July 4, 1981, Peralta once again tried to be the Spanish National heavyweight champion rematching Felipe Rodriguez, however, Rodriguez once again proved superior. Peralta defended his light heavyweight crown on his next match against Emilio Garcia, however, the newcomer Garcia scored an upset against Peralta and stopped Peralta in the last round of their scheduled match. Peralta tried to capture the belt in the next year against Emilio Garcia, unfortunately, Garcia retained his title drawing with Peralta.

=== Retirement ===
After drawing with Emilio Garcia previously, on October 14, 1982, Peralta battled his last match against future Italian world-title challenger Angelo Rottoli in Marano Vicentino, Veneto, Italy. Peralta was stopped in the second round due to an injury, next year he officially retired.

== Professional boxing record ==
150 fights	103 wins	32 losses
By knockout	64	7
By decision	35	23
By disqualification	4	2
Draws	15	

No.	Result	Record	Opponent	Type	Round, time	Date	Location	Notes
150	Loss	103–32–15	Angelo Rottoli	TKO	2 (8)	14 Oct 1982	Marano Vicentino, Veneto, Italy	
149	Draw	103–31–15	Emilio García	PTS	10	3 Sep 1982	Madrid, Community of Madrid, Spain	For Spanish light-heavyweight title
148	Loss	103–31–14	Walter Cevoli	PTS	8	6 Jul 1982	Rimini, Emilia-Romagna, Italy	
147	Loss	103–30–14	Felipe Rodríguez	PTS	8	6 May 1982	Bilbao, Basque Community, Spain	
146	Loss	103–29–14	Richard Caramanolis	KO	9 (10)	11 Dec 1981	Marseille, Bouches-du-Rhône, France	
145	Loss	103–28–14	Pierre Babo Kabassu	PTS	10	31 Oct 1981	Kinshasa, Kinshasa Province, Zaire	
144	Loss	103–27–14	John Odhiambho	PTS	8	9 Oct 1981	K.B. Hallen, Copenhagen, Denmark	
143	Loss	103–26–14	Emilio García	TKO	10 (10	29 Aug 1981	Melilla, Málaga, Spain	Lost Spanish light-heavyweight title
142	Loss	103–25–14	Felipe Rodríguez	PTS	10	4 Jul 1981	Pabellón de los Deportes, Pontevedra, Spain	For Spanish heavyweight title
141	Win	103–24–14	Easy Boy Michael	PTS	8	18 May 1981	Schiehal, Rotterdam, Netherlands	
140	Loss	102–24–14	Sylvain Watbled	TKO	3 (10)	19 Mar 1981	Paris, France	
139	Loss	102–23–14	Fred Serres	PTS	10	27 Feb 1981	Differdange, Esch-sur-Alzette, Luxembourg	
138	Win	102–22–14	Alejandro Cardoso	PTS	8	21 Nov 1980	Palacio Municipal de Deportes San Moix, Palma de Mallorca, Spain	
137	Win	101–22–14	Pierre Babo Kabassu	PTS	10	31 Oct 1980	Izegem, West Flanders, Belgium	
136	Win	100–22–14	Alejandro Cardoso	PTS	10	28 Aug 1980	Melilla, Málaga, Spain	Retained Spanish light-heavyweight title
135	Win	99–22–14	Alejandro Cardoso	PTS	10	8 Aug 1980	Campo del Gas, Madrid, Spain	Won vacant Spanish light-heavyweight title
134	Loss	98–22–14	Hocine Tafer	PTS	10	27 Jun 1980	Saint-Denis, Seine-Saint-Denis, France	
133	Loss	98–21–14	Felipe Rodríguez	PTS	10	7 Jun 1980	Pabellón de los Deportes, Pontevedra, Spain	For Spanish heavyweight title
132	Loss	98–20–14	Neil Malpass	PTS	8	28 Apr 1980	Berlin, West Germany	
131	Loss	98–19–14	Mustafa Wasajja	PTS	8	29 Feb 1980	Idrætshal, Odense, Denmark	
130	Win	98–18–14	Jean-Pierre Coopman	PTS	10	25 Dec 1979	Izegem, West Flanders, Belgium	
129	Draw	97–18–14	Faustino Quinales	PTS	8	13 Oct 1979	Polideportivo de Anoeta, San Sebastián, Spain	
128	Win	97–18–13	José Antonio Gálvez	PTS	8	6 Oct 1979	Pabellón de La Casilla, Bilbao, Spain	
127	Loss	96–18–13	Tony Moore	PTS	10	25 Aug 1979	Palacio de los Deported de Riazor, A Coruña, Spain	
126	Win	96–17–13	José Antonio Gálvez	PTS	8	21 Jul 1979	Benidorm, Valencian Community, Spain	
125	Loss	95–17–13	Alfio Righetti	PTS	10	27 Apr 1979	Rimini, Emilia-Romagna, Italy	
124	Loss	95–16–13	Lorenzo Zanon	PTS	8	4 Mar 1979	Teatro Ariston, Sanremo, Italy	
123	Loss	95–15–13	Felipe Rodríguez	TKO	3 (8)	2 Dec 1978	Pabellón de los Deportes, Pontevedra, Spain	
122	Win	95–14–13	Alejandro Cardoso	TKO	7 (8)	3 Nov 1978	Palacio de los Deportes de Riazor, A Coruña, Spain	
121	Draw	94–14–13	Aldo Traversaro	PTS	15	5 Sep 1978	Bibione, Veneto, Italy	For European light-heavyweight title
120	Win	94–14–12	Sugar Silex	PTS	8	20 May 1978	Palacio de los Deportes de Riazor, A Coruña, Spain	
119	Win	93–14–12	José Lozano	KO	4 (8)	6 May 1978	Palacios de los Deportes, Madrid, Spain	
118	Draw	92–14–12	Tony Moore	PTS	8	17 Feb 1978	Palacios de los Deportes, Madrid, Spain	
117	Win	92–14–11	Hennie Thoonen	PTS	10	31 Oct 1977	Sportpaleis Ahoy', Rotterdam, Netherlands	
116	Draw	91–14–11	Mustafa Wasajja	PTS	6	2 Jun 1977	Hallen, Randers, Denmark	
115	Draw	91–14–10	Leo Kakolewicz	PTS	10	20 May 1977	Hanover, Lower Saxony, West Germany	
114	Draw	91–14–9	Ennio Cometti	PTS	8	28 Apr 1977	Munich, Bavaria, West Germany	
113	Win	91–14–8	Gregory Downes	TKO	7 (10)	1 Apr 1977	Cologne, North Rhine-Westphalia, West Germany	
112	Win	90–14–8	Billy Aird	DQ	5 (10), 2:00	28 Feb 1977	Caesar's Palace, Luton, England	Aird was disqualified for illegal use of head
111	Win	89–14–8	Horst Lang	KO	2 (10)	29 Oct 1976	Cologne, North Rhine-Westphalia, West Germany	
110	Win	88–14–8	Harald Skog	PTS	8	21 Oct 1976	Messehallen, Oslo, Norway	
109	Draw	87–14–8	Tony Greene	PTS	8	18 Jun 1976	Deutschlandhalle, Berlin, West Germany	
108	Loss	87–14–7	Pierre Fourie	PTS	10	22 May 1976	Rand Stadium, Johannesburg, South Africa	
107	Draw	87–13–7	Tom Bethea	PTS	10	16 Jan 1976	Deutschlandhalle, Berlin, West Germany	
106	Draw	87–13–6	Sugar Ray Anderson	PTS	10	12 Sep 1975	Offenbach, Hesse, West Germany	
105	Win	87–13–5	Bernd August	TKO	3 (10)	6 Sep 1975	Berlin, West Germany	
104	Loss	86–13–5	Tom Bethea	KO	3 (10)	30 May 1975	Hamburg, Hamburg State, West Germany	
103	Win	86–12–5	Eddie Duncan	KO	7 (10)	4 Apr 1975	Hamburg, Hamburg State, West Germany	
102	Win	85–12–5	Hal Caroll	UD	10	18 Mar 1975	Stadthalle, Vienna, Austria	
101	Win	84–12–5	Conny Velensek	TKO	8 (10)	1 Mar 1975	Cologne, North Rhine-Westphalia, West Germany	
100	Win	83–12–5	Rüdiger Schmidtke	TKO	4 (10)	31 Jan 1975	Hamburg, Hamburg State, West Germany	
99	Win	82–12–5	Sugar Ray Anderson	TKO	8 (10)	18 Jan 1975	Hamburg, Hamburg State, West Germany	
98	Win	81–12–5	Kilani Ramdani	TKO	5 (8)	7 Jan 1975	Stadthalle, Vienna, Austria	
97	Win	80–12–5	Kilani Ramdani	KO	3 (8)	10 Dec 1974	Offenbach, Hesse, West Germany	
96	Loss	79–12–5	Rudi Lubbers	DQ	5 (10)	14 Oct 1974	Sportpaleis Ahoy', Rotterdam, Netherlands	
95	Win	79–11–5	Maxie Smith	TKO	3 (10)	7 Jun 1974	Vienna, Vienna Federal State, Austria	
94	Win	78–11–5	Jean Tshikuna	KO	2 (8)	14 May 1974	Graz, Styria, Austria	
93	Win	77–11–5	Ngozika Ekwelum	PTS	10	20 Feb 1974	Deutschlandhalle, Berlin, West Germany	
92	Win	76–11–5	Carlo Clementi	TKO	2 (10)	15 Feb 1974	Lübeck, Schleswig-Holstein, West Germany	
91	Win	75–11–5	Ba Sounkalo	KO	3 (10)	8 Feb 1974	Frankfurt, Hesse, West Germany	
90	Win	74–11–5	Billy Suze	PTS	8	11 Jan 1974	Palacios de los Deportes, Madrid, Spain	
89	Win	73–11–5	Hartmut Sasse	PTS	8	9 Nov 1973	Berlin, West Germany	
88	Win	72–11–5	Miguel Ángel Páez	TKO	6 (10)	26 Oct 1973	Cologne, North Rhine-Westphalia, West Germany	
87	Win	71–11–5	Ba Sounkalo	PTS	10	21 Sep 1973	Ernst-Merck-Halle, Hamburg, West Germany	
86	Win	70–11–5	Christian Poncelet	TKO	5 (10)	13 May 1973	Kiel, Schleswig-Holstein, West Germany	
85	Win	69–11–5	Eddie Patterson	TKO	3 (10)	6 Apr 1973	Hamburg, Hamburg State, West Germany	
84	Win	68–11–5	Charley Green	PTS	10	2 Mar 1973	Berlin, West Germany	
83	Loss	67–11–5	Raúl Arturo Loyola	PTS	10	30 Jan 1973	Estadio Luna Park, Buenos Aires, Argentina	
82	Loss	67–10–5	Jorge Ahumada	TKO	5 (10)	11 Oct 1972	Medina, Tucumán Province, Argentina	
81	Loss	67–9–5	Víctor Galíndez	PTS	12	7 Oct 1972	Estadio Luna Park, Buenos Aires, Argentina	Lost South American light-heavyweight title
80	Loss	67–8–5	Víctor Galíndez	PTS	12	2 Sep 1972	Estadio Luna Park, Buenos Aires, Argentine	Lost Argentine light-heavyweight title
79	Win	67–7–5	Rubén González	RTD	6 (10)	8 Jul 1972	Rosario, Santa Fe Province, Argentina	
78	Win	66–7–5	Jorge Ahumada	PTS	10	24 Jun 1972	Estadio Luna Park, Buenos Aires, Argentina	
77	Win	65–7–5	Juan Aguilar	PTS	12	29 Apr 1972	Estadio Luna Park, Buenos Aires, Argentina	Retained South American light-heavyweight titles; Won Argentine light-heavyweight title
76	Win	64–7–5	Eddie Jones	PTS	10	15 Apr 1972	Mar del Plata, Buenos Aires Provinec, Argentina	
75	Win	63–7–5	Roberto Aguilar	TKO	6 (10)	1 Apr 1972	Mar del Plata, Buenos Aires Province, Argentina	
74	Win	62–7–5	Carlos C Pouyannes	DQ	8 (10)	15 Jan 1972	Tandil, Buenos Aires Province, Argentina	
73	Win	61–7–5	Víctor Galíndez	PTS	10	18 Dec 1971	Estadio Luna Park, Buenos Aires, Argentina	
72	Win	60–7–5	Juan Aguilar	PTS	10	20 Oct 1971	Estadio Luna Park, Buenos Aires, Argentina	
71	Win	59–7–5	Víctor Galíndez	TKO	9 (10)	11 Sep 1971	Estadio Luna Park, Buenos Aires, Argentina	
70	Win	58–7–5	Pedro Rimovsky	TKO	9 (10)	25 Aug 1971	Buenos Aires, Distrito Federal, Argentina	
69	Loss	57–7–5	Juan Aguilar	PTS	12	11 Jun 1971	Ciudad Mendoza, Mendoza Province, Argentina	Lost Argentine light-heavyweight title
68	Loss	57–6–5	Jorge Ahumada	PTS	10	20 Mar 1971	Estadio Luna Park, Buenos Aires, Argentina	
67	Loss	57–5–5	Víctor Galíndez	PTS	10	9 Jan 1971	Estadio Luna Park, Buenos Aires, Argentina	
66	Win	57–4–5	Víctor Galíndez	PTS	12	28 Nov 1970	Estadio Luna Park, Buenos Aires, Argentina	Retained Argentine light-heavyweight title
65	Win	56–4–5	Carlos Santagada	RTD	6 (10)	9 Oct 1970	Cipolletti, Río Negro Province, Argentina	
64	Win	55–4–5	Gabino Bay	KO	6 (10)	22 Aug 1970	Olvarría, Buenos Aires Province, Argentina	
63	Loss	54–4–5	Eddie Jones	UD	10	11 Jul 1970	Estadio Luna Park, Buenos Aires, Argentina	
62	Win	54–3–5	Juan Aguilar	TKO	7 (10)	8 May 1970	Ciudad Mendoza, Mendoza Province, Argentina	
61	Win	53–3–5	Ángel Alberto Coria	TKO	5 (10)	28 Mar 1970	Estadio Bristol, Mar del Plata, Argentina	
60	Win	52–3–5	Ángel Alberto Coria	PTS	10	9 Jan 1970	Mar del Plata, Buenos Aires Province, Argentina	
59	Loss	51–3–5	Vicente Rondón	PTS	10	6 Dec 1969	Estadio Luna Park, Buenos Aires, Argentina	
58	Win	51–2–5	Carlos Santagada	TKO	4 (10)	8 Oct 1969	Olavarría, Buenos Aires Provine, Argentina	
57	Win	50–2–5	Ramón Rocha	PTS	10	4 Oct 1969	Rivadavia, Mendoza Province, Argentina	
56	Win	49–2–5	Óscar Wondryk	KO	3 (10)	12 Sep 1969	Córdoba, Córdoba Province, Argentina	
55	Win	48–2–5	Luiz Rosendo	KO	7 (10)	23 Aug 1969	Estadio Luna Park, Buenos Aires, Argentina	
54	Draw	47–2–5	Ramón Rocha	MD	10	1 Aug 1969	Estadio Felipe Milia, Rosario, Argentina	
53	Win	47–2–4	Mario Loayza	KO	4 (10)	17 Aug 1969	Santa Rosa, Salta Province, Argentina	
52	Win	46–2–4	José Menno	UD	12	14 May 1969	Estadio Luna Park, Buenos Aires, Argentina	Retained Argentine light-heavyweight title
51	Loss	45–2–4	José Menno	UD	10	13 Mar 1969	Club Atenas, La Plata, Argentina	
50	Win	45–1–4	Kurt Lüdecke	TKO	3 (10)	1 Feb 1969	Mar del Plata, Buenos Aires Province, Argentina	
49	Win	44–1–4	Enrique Mayo	TKO	1 (10)	27 Dec 1978	La Plata, Buenos Aires Province, Argentina	
48	Win	43–1–4	Óscar Wondryk	KO	5 (10)	14 Dec 1968	Azul, Distrito Federal, Argentina	
47	Win	42–1–4	Miguel Ángel Páez	UD	12	23 Nov 1968	Estadio Luna Park, Buenos Aires, Argentina	Won Argentine light-heavyweight title
46	Win	41–1–4	Ángel Márquez	TKO	8 (10)	30 Oct 1968	Estadio Luna Park, Buenos Aires, Argentina	
45	Win	40–1–4	José Ferreyra	TKO	2 (10)	4 Oct 1968	Trelew, Chubut Province, Argentina	
44	Win	39–1–4	Santos Giménez	DQ	3 (10)	14 Sep 1968	Estadio Luna Park, Buenos Aires, Argentina	
43	Win	38–1–4	Renato de Moraes	KO	6 (10)	10 Aug 1968	Estadio Luna Park, Buenos Aires, Province	
42	Win	37–1–4	Ángel Márquez	KO	10 (10)	19 Jul 1968	Ciudad Mendoza, Mendoza Province, Argentina	
41	Draw	36–1–4	Miguel Ángel Páez	PTS	10	15 Jun 1968	Mar del Plata, Buenos Aires Province, Argentina	
40	Loss	36–1–3	Santos Giménez	DQ	4 (10)	22 May 1968	Estadio Luna Park, Buenos Aires, Argentina	Peralta was disqualified for hitting low
39	Win	36–0–3	Ignacio Magallanes	KO	9 (10)	11 May 1968	Azul, Distrito Federal, Argentina	
38	Win	35–0–3	Mario Tarsetti	TKO	4 (10)	3 Apr 1968	Buenos Aires, Distrito Federal, Argentina	
37	Win	34–0–3	Roberto Veliz	KO	3 (10)	17 Feb 1968	Azul, Distrito Federal, Argentina	
36	Draw	33–0–3	José Menno	PTS	10	3 Feb 1968	Estadio Bristol, Mar del Plata, Argentina	
35	Draw	33–0–2	José Menno	PTS	10	6 Jan 1968	Estadio Bristol, Mar del Plata, Argentina	
34	Win	33–0–1	Óscar Coria	KO	6 (10)	4 Nov 1967	Mar del Plata, Buenos Aires Province, Argentina	
33	Win	32–0–1	Luiz Rosendo	KO	7 (10)	21 Oct 1967	Azul, Distrito Federal, Argentina	
32	Win	31–0–1	Bruno Segura	KO	2 (10)	6 Oct 1967	Paso de los Libres, Corrientes Province, Argentina	
31	Win	30–0–1	Marcelo Garnica	TKO	4 (10)	20 Sep 1967	Estadio Luna Park, Buenos Aires, Argentina	
30	Win	29–0–1	Bruno Segura	KO	3 (10)	5 Aug 1967	Alumni Azuleno FBC, Azul, Argentina	
29	Win	28–0–1	Luis Rafael Gargiulo	TKO	8 (10)	12 Jul 1967	Estadio Luna Park, Buenos Aires, Argentina	
28	Win	27–0–1	Marcelo Garnica	PTS	10	20 May 1967	Tandil, Buenos Aires Province, Argentina	
27	Win	26–0–1	Hugo Daniele	PTS	10	6 May 1967	Azul, Distrito Federal, Argentina	
26	Win	25–0–1	Antonio Magaldi	DQ	8 (10)	17 Mar 1967	Club Lavalle, San Nicolás, Argentina	
25	Win	24–0–1	Alberto Massi	KO	2 (10)	4 Mar 1967	Azul, Distrito Federal, Argentina	
24	Win	23–0–1	Aníbal Córdoba	TKO	7 (10)	16 Dec 1966	San Juan, San Juan Province, Argentina	
23	Win	22–0–1	Gregorio Gómez	TKO	5 (10)	18 Nov 1966	San Juan, San Juan Province, Argentina	
22	Win	21–0–1	René Sosa	KO	5 (10)	5 Nov 1966	Azul, Distrito Federal, Argentina	
21	Win	20–0–1	Luis Antonio Pereyra	RTD	4 (10)	8 Oct 1966	Azul, Distrito Federal, Argentina	
20	Win	19–0–1	Nelson Valdez	TKO	4 (10)	17 Sep 1966	Dolores, Buenos Aires Province, Argentina	
19	Win	18–0–1	Gregorio Gómez	PTS	10	3 Sep 1966	Azul, Distrito Federal, Argentina	
18	Win	17–0–1	Aníbal Córdoba	PTS	10	20 Aug 1966	Tandil, Buenos Aires Province, Argentina	
17	Win	16–0–1	Marcelo Garnica	PTS	10	6 Aug 1966	Azul, Distrito Federal, Argentina	
16	Win	15–0–1	Ricardo Medina	KO	3 (10)	9 Jul 1966	Azul, Distrito Federal, Argentina	
15	Win	14–0–1	Natividad Orona	TKO	10 (10)	18 Jun 1966	Azul, Distrito Federal, Argentina	
14	Win	13–0–1	Jorge Omar Tissera	KO	8 (10)	4 Jun 1966	Azul, Distrito Federal, Argentina	
13	Win	12–0–1	Gregorio Gómez	PTS	10	21 May 1966	Azul, Distrito Federal, Argentina	
12	Win	11–0–1	Natividad Orona	PTS	10	7 May 1966	Azul, Distrito Federal, Argentina	
11	Win	10–0–1	Roberto Eduardo Carabajal	KO	8 (10)	23 Apr 1966	Olavarría, Buenos Aires Province, Argentina	
10	Draw	9–0–1	Marcelo Garnica	PTS	10	2 Apr 1966	Azul, Distrito Federal, Argentina	
9	Win	9–0	Aníbal Córdoba	PTS	10	4 Feb 1966	Azul, Distrito Federal, Argentina	
8	Win	8–0	Federal Magariños	KO	6 (8)	10 Dec 1965	Azul, Distrito Federal, Argentina	
7	Win	7–0	Omar Peppi	KO	4 (8)	20 Nov 1965	Estadio Luna Park, Buenos Aires, Argentina	
6	Win	6–0	Ubaldo Marcos Bustos	KO	6 (8)	6 Nov 1965	Azul, Distrito Federal, Argentina	
5	Win	5–0	Miguel González	KO	6 (8)	9 Oct 1965	Azul, Distrito Federal, Argentina	
4	Win	4–0	Nelson Valdez	KO	7 (8)	11 Sep 1965	Azul, Distrito Federal, Argentina	
3	Win	3–0	Rito Leiva	KO	3 (8)	2 Jul 1965	Azul, Distrito Federal, Argentina	
2	Win	2–0	Ángel Alberto Coria	KO	6 (8)	19 Jun 1965	Azul, Distrito Federal, Argentina	
1	Win	1–0	Raúl Díaz	TKO	3 (8)	12 Jun 1965	Azul, Distrito Federal, Argentina	

== Death ==
Avenamar Peralta died at the age of 71 on October 13, 2014, at 10:30 p.m. The rigor of 150 professional bouts took its toll on his health in the last years of his life. Avenamar asked for his remains to be cremated and then his ashes be scattered in places close to the affection of the Peralta family. First at the Station Site, linked to Avenamar's adolescence then in the Domingo Faustino Sarmiento Municipal Park, where he would go running as a boxer and the procedure ended at Almirante Brown Municipal Spa, where he went in the summers. His family and close companions paid a heartfelt tribute.
