= Ray Anderson (boxer) =

American boxer

Ray Anderson (born August 31, 1944, in Anniston, Alabama) was a boxer in the light heavyweight division who fought from 1965 to 1977. Anderson became the first challenger to last fifteen rounds against Bob Foster for the world Light Heavyweight title, but he lost what was his only world title try by decision. Anderson currently lives in Anniston.

== Professional career ==
Anderson began his rise to prominence in 1966. As a light heavyweight he took on and beat a formidable heavyweight journeyman named Amos Johnson in a ten-rounder at The Akron Armory in Akron, Ohio. As an amateur, Anderson was one of the few men to beat the young Cassius Clay (known later as Muhammad Ali) who went on to become the Heavyweight Champion of the world. Ray's career continued as he fought Joe Byrd of Flint, Michigan, in 1969, knocking Joe out in round 1. Ray also knocked out Canton's Marion Conner in Round 2, sealing his stature as Ohio's best light heavyweight. He fought John Griffin of Syracuse, New York twice, losing both in close decisions.

Ray Anderson was credited by Joe Frazier, who long used him as a sparring partner because of his tall rangy Ali-like style as assisting him in his preparation to unify the heavyweight title in 1970, with his win over WBA heavyweight titleholder Jimmy Ellis at Madison Square Garden. Later in 1970, Anderson was to bite off more than he could chew when he decided to fight a young prospect at the Cleveland Arena in Cleveland, Ohio named Ted Gullick, after providing Gullick with a boxing lesson in rounds 1 through 4, toward the end of the fourth Gullick scored a knockdown with a sharp left hook. Anderson rose and was in part saved by the bell. Later Gullick dominated the fight and finished Anderson in the 9th round by knocking him out. Anderson beat Gregorio Peralta by a ten-round decision in Spain in 1972.

The pinnacle of Ray's career was his challenge to the former Light Heavyweight Champion of the World Bob Foster. Anderson was a tall light-heavyweight of his era, standing 6 feet 1 inch. However, Foster was 6 feet 3 1/2 inches and could punch very hard. Anderson was not used to giving away height; he prided himself in being both handsome and fast. He was not willing to risk being hit by Foster, thus he chose to dance and defend for most of the fight, thus losing a fifteen-round decision. To Anderson's credit he was one of the few men that would last all 15 rounds with Foster. The late Yank Durham, Joe Frazier's trainer, worked Anderson's corner during the Foster fight felt that Anderson should have eliminated the Ali style tactics and take it to Foster and was upset by the outcome. Anderson had proven to be a very respected fighter early on and once joining promoter Don King, seemed to start an altered course in his career which can't be explained. It is thought that King wanted to use Anderson to promote other upcoming boxers in order to propel himself into the limelight instead of using Anderson's talent to help him reach the top of the rankings. Anderson's children Deric and Eric (twins), and Brigitte Anderson were last known to reside in Ohio. In the early 90's one (or both) of Anderson's twin sons; were known for his athletic abilities and had shown glimpses of skills that would advance him into professional football. However, details of his efforts are not recorded.

== Professional boxing record ==
36 Wins (21 knockouts, 15 decisions), 19 Losses (11 knockouts, 8 decision), 5 Draws
Result	Record	Opponent	Type	Round	Date	Location	Notes
Loss	28-3-3	(United States) Mike Rossman	TKO	4	1977-03-02	(New York (state)) Madison Square Garden, New York City, United States	
Draw	18-8-1	(Mali) Ba Sounkalo	PTS	10	1976-12-04	Hamburg, Germany	
Loss	9-0	(United States) Marvin Johnson	TKO	6	1976-04-03	Indianapolis, Indiana, United States	
Loss	16-0	(Argentina) Miguel Angel Cuello	KO	6	1976-02-20	Alsterdorfer Sporthalle, Alsterdorf, Germany	
Win	42-7-2	(Argentina) Jorge Ahumada	PTS	10	1975-11-28	Hamburg, Germany	
Draw	86-13-4	(Argentina) Avenamar Peralta	PTS	10	1975-09-12	Offenbach, Germany	
Loss	7-2-4	(Nigeria) Ngozika Ekwelum	KO	5	1975-06-24	Berlin, Germany	
Loss	42-6	(Jamaica) Bunny Johnson	PTS	8	1975-06-19	Jordal Amfi, Oslo, Norway	
Draw	7-2-3	(Nigeria) Ngozika Ekwelum	PTS	8	1975-05-16	Ludwigshafen, Germany	
Loss	10-0-1	(Norway) Harald Skog	PTS	10	1975-03-13	Oslo, Norway	
Loss	80-12-4	(Argentina) Avenamar Peralta	TKO	8	1975-01-18	Hamburg, Germany	
Loss	5-0	(United States) James "Great" Scott	UD	10	1974-04-23	Miami Beach, Florida, United States	
Loss	26-6-4	(Argentina) Victor Galindez	KO	2	1974-02-16	Balcarce, Buenos Aires Province, Argentina	Anderson knocked out at 1:23 of the second round.
Draw	39-9-3	(United States) Jimmy "The Cat" Dupree	PTS	10	1973-11-28	Cleveland, Ohio, United States	
Loss	32-5-1	(Argentina) Jorge Ahumada	TKO	8	1973-08-13	(New York (state)) Felt Forum, New York City, United States	
Win	50-16-14	(Argentina) Miguel Angel Paez	PTS	8	1973-03-12	Palais des Sports (Paris), Paris, France	
Loss	13-15-2	(United States) Roy "Cookie" Wallace	SD	10	1973-02-14	Cleveland, Ohio, United States	
Win	90-7-8	(Argentina) Gregorio Peralta	PTS	10	1972-06-09	Madrid, Spain	
Loss	9-1-1	(Mali) Ba Sounkalo	PTS	10	1972-03-27	Paris, France	
Loss	23-6-1	(United States) Joe "Cigarette" Burns	KO	9	1972-01-15	New Orleans, Louisiana, United States	
Win	3-10	(United States) JD McCauley	KO	7	1971-11-10	Akron, Ohio, United States	
Loss	42-5	(United States) Bob Foster	UD	15	1971-04-24	Curtis Hixon Hall, Tampa, Florida, United States	WBC World Light Heavyweight Title. 140-145, 139-148, 138-149.
Win	25-2	(United States) Hal Carroll	PTS	10	1970-11-18	Ashland, Ohio, United States	
Loss	13-3	(United States) Johnny "70s" Griffin	UD	10	1970-09-14	Akron, Ohio, United States	
Loss	12-3	(United States) Johnny "70s" Griffin	PTS	10	1970-08-03	Norton, Ohio, United States	
Loss	12-6	(United States) Charley "Devil" Green	TKO	1	1970-04-28	(New York (state)) Felt Forum, New York City, United States	Referee stopped the bout at 1:36 of the first round.
Draw	27-7-2	(United States) Allen "Bibliophile" Thomas	PTS	10	1970-03-30	Chicago, Illinois, United States	
Win	2-3-1	(United States) Hydra Lacy	KO	4	1970-01-27	Orlando, Florida, United States	
Loss	5-0	(United States) Ted Gullick	KO	9	1969-12-10	Cleveland, Ohio, United States	
Win	14-9-2	(United States) Joe Hopkins	KO	1	1969-11-21	Rapid City, South Dakota, United States	
Win	9-5	(Canada) Ed Ostapovich	KO	1	1969-11-13	(Washington (state)) Seattle Center Arena, Seattle, Washington, United States	
Win	10-6	(United States) Joe "Nice Guy" Byrd	TKO	1	1969-11-06	Akron, Ohio, United States	
Win	27-6	(United States) Karl Zurheide	UD	10	1969-10-06	Minneapolis, Minnesota, United States	
Win	46-15-1	(United States) Pete Riccitelli	KO	5	1969-08-11	Saint Paul, Minnesota, United States	
Win	49-50-12	(United States) Billy "Boggy" Marsh	KO	3	1969-07-23	Orlando, Florida, United States	
Win	7-10-1	(United States) Roy "Cookie" Wallace	PTS	10	1969-06-03	(Georgia (U.S. state)) Atlanta, Georgia, United States	
Win	15-34-11	(United States) Frank "Snakebite" Niblett	UD	10	1969-05-27	Oakland, California, United States	8-1, 7-2, 8-1.
Win	9-7-5	(United States) Willie McIntyre	KO	2	1969-04-01	Orlando, Florida, United States	
Win	26-17-1	(United States) Marion "Thunderbolt" Connor	TKO	2	1969-03-23	Canton, Ohio, United States	
Win	15-13-2	(United States) Willie Tiger	TKO	1	1969-03-05	Akron, Ohio, United States	
Win	26-16-1	(United States) Marion "Thunderbolt" Connor	UD	10	1969-01-26	Canton, Ohio, United States	Ohio Heavyweight Title.
Win	17-8-2	(United States) Hubert "Happy Wanderer" Hilton	TKO	3	1969-01-10	(New York (state)) Felt Forum, New York City, United States	Referee stopped the bout at 2:54 of the third round.
Win	22-8-2	(United States) Amos Johnson	PTS	10	1968-11-06	Akron, Ohio, United States	
Win	11-4	(United States) Eddie Dembry	TKO	1	1968-09-18	Mansfield, Ohio, United States	
Win	--	Jimmy "The Poll" Harris	TKO	1	1968-02-14	Akron, Ohio, United States	
Loss	8-1	(United States) Willie "Monster" McMillan	TKO	6	1967-07-19	(New York (state)) Madison Square Garden, New York City, United States	Referee stopped the bout at 2:21 of the sixth round.
Win	0-3	(United States) Bobby Lawson	KO	2	1967-05-27	Columbus, Ohio, United States	Lawson knocked out at 1:42 of the second round.
Win	4-2-1	(Spain) Francisco San Jose	PTS	8	1967-04-28	Stockholm, Sweden	
Win	8-7	(United States) Vic Brown	UD	6	1967-03-15	Akron, Ohio, United States	
Win	0-5	(United States) James Goree	KO	2	1967-02-21	Winterland Arena, San Francisco, California, United States	Goree knocked out at 1:51 of the second round.
Win	2-1	(United States) Tom "Liberty" Bell	KO	1	1967-01-15	Akron, Ohio, United States	
Win	7-11-2	(United States) Bob Slaughter	PTS	6	1966-12-05	Philadelphia, Pennsylvania, United States	
Win	10-2-1	(Canada) Bob "Pretty Boy" Felstein	KO	5	1966-10-26	Akron, Ohio, United States	
Win	7-0	(United States) Jimmy McClain	PTS	6	1966-06-14	Pittsburgh, Pennsylvania, United States	
Win	0-1	(United States) Al "Hank" Williams	KO	1	1966-05-25	Akron, Ohio, United States	Williams knocked out at 1:28 of the first round.
Win	--	(United States) Al "Hank" Williams	KO	1	1966-03-11	Cincinnati, Ohio, United States	
Win	0-2	(United States) Gene "Ashes to Ashes" Hunt	KO	2	1966-03-02	Akron, Ohio, United States	
Win	--	James "The Boss" Ross	PTS	4	1966-02-02	Akron, Ohio, United States	
Win	1-0	(United States) Larry Tatum	PTS	4	1965-12-16	Akron, Ohio, United States	
Win	0-1	(United States) Gene "Ashes to Ashes" Hunt	TKO	3	1965-07-14	Akron, Ohio, United States	Referee stopped the bout at 1:37 of the third round.

== Exhibition boxing record ==
2 fights	0 wins	0 losses
Non-scored	2	

No.	Result	Record	Opponent	Type	Round, time	Date	Location	Notes
2	—N/a	0–0 (2)	(United States) Muhammad Ali	—N/a	2	Oct 11, 1972	(United States) Boston Garden, Boston, Massachusetts U.S.	Non-scored bout
1	—N/a	0–0 (1)	(United States) Muhammad Ali	—N/a	2	Aug 24, 1972	(United States) Baltimore Civic Center, Baltimore, Maryland U.S.	Non-scored bout
