= Víctor Galíndez =

Argentine boxer (1948–1980)

Personal information
- Nickname: El Leopardo de Morón
- Nationality: Argentina
- Born: Víctor Emilio Galíndez Torre; 2 November 1948 Vedia, Buenos Aires
- Died: 25 October 1980 (aged 31) 25 de Mayo, Buenos Aires Province
- Height: 1.75 m (5 ft 9 in)
- Weight: Light heavyweight

Boxing career

Boxing record
- Total fights: 70
- Wins: 55
- Win by KO: 34
- Losses: 9
- Draws: 4
- No contests: 2
Medal record
Men's boxing
Representing Argentina
Pan American Games
Silver medal – second place	1967 Winnipeg	Light middleweight

Víctor Emilio Galíndez Torre (Note: In this name that follows Hispanic American naming customs, the first or paternal surname is Galíndez and the second or maternal family name is Torre.) (2 November 1948 – 25 October 1980) was an Argentine boxer who was the third Latin American to win the world Light Heavyweight championship, after Puerto Rico's José Torres and Venezuela's Vicente Rondon.

Galíndez was born in Vedia in the Leandro N. Alem Partido of the Buenos Aires Province in Argentina in 1948. He aspired to become both a boxer and a stock car pilot since an early age, but he was more interested in boxing. As an amateur, he compiled a winning record and participated in the 1968 Summer Olympics in Mexico City, where he lost in a preliminary round bout to Aldo Bentini of Italy. A year earlier he claimed the silver medal at the 1967 Pan American Games.

Galíndez then turned professional, and on 10 May 1969, he debuted as a paid fighter with a win over Ramon Ruiz by a knockout in four at Buenos Aires. After one more win, he faced Adolfo Cejas in Azul, Argentina, in a fight which resulted in a ten-round draw.

In 1970, Galíndez had 10 fights, a span during which he went 5–3–1, with one no contest. He suffered his first loss, at the hands of Juan Aguilar, by a decision in ten, and had a second and third fight with Aguilar, of which the second ended in a first round no contest, and the second in another Aguilar decision win. He began his five fight rivalry with Jorge Ahumada knocking Ahumada out in five rounds, and lost the Argentine Light Heavyweight title with a twelve-round decision defeat against Avenamar Peralta.

He and Peralta had an immediate, non-title rematch in 1971, and Galíndez won by a ten-round decision. 1971 was a year of rematches for Galíndez, the only new boxer he met that year being Pedro Rimovsky, and he too, had a rematch with Galíndez before that year was over. He lost to Ahumada in the second of the five fights between them, by a decision in Mendoza, Argentina, then beat him in fight three by a knockout in nine, and in fight four by a knockout in six, both the third and fourth fight being held in Buenos Aires. He and Rimovsky had a first round no contest in their first bout, and drew over the ten round distance in the rematch, and then Galíndez had two more fights with Peralta, losing by a knockout in nine and a decision in 10.

In 1973, Galíndez had eight fights, winning seven and drawing one. He was finally able to obtain Argentina's Light Heavyweight title, by beating Aguilar by a decision in twelve. He beat Aguilar once again, by a knockout in six, and he also beat Eddie Owens, Eddie Duncan and Raul Loyola, the latter being beaten twice, one time defending his Argentine title.

He began 1974 with a step up in class, meeting former world title challenger Ray Anderson, beating him by a knockout in two. After six more consecutive wins, he was given his first shot at a world title, facing Len Hutchins for the WBA's vacant world Light Heavyweight championship. Galíndez then joined Torres and Rondon as the only Hispanic Light Heavyweight world champions in history, and Carlos Monzón as the only Argentine world champions of that era, with a TKO of Hutchins in the thirteenth round to become the WBA's world Light Heavyweight champion.

Galíndez, who never fought outside Argentina before becoming a world champion, became a traveling fighter after that. After he beat Johnny Griffin in Buenos Aires by knockout in six in a non-title bout, it was off to South Africa, for his first international fight, which was, at the same time, his first world title defense. He beat Pierre Fourie there by a decision. Next was Las Vegas, for his first fight in the United States, another non title affair. He knocked out Ray Elson in eight there. Next stop was the Madison Square Garden in New York, where he and arch-rival Ahumada met for a fifth time, this time with the world title on the line. After beating Ahumada by a decision in 15, Galíndez returned to South Africa, where he once again beat Fourie by decision in 15.

1976 saw a trip to Norway, where he beat Harald Skog by a knockout in three to retain the title, and to Denmark, where he beat Jesse Burnett by a decision in ten in a non tite affair. Then came a third trip to South Africa, where he knocked out challenger Richie Kates in the 15th and last round, and, after a fight with Billy Douglas in Buenos Aires, (a win by decision in ten) he found himself in South Africa once again, where he beat Kosie Smith by a decision in fifteen to once again, retain the title.

After beginning 1977 by beating Guillermo Aquirrezabala by a knockout in four in Mendoza, he and Kates had a rematch in Rome, Italy, where Galíndez once again beat Kates by decision over 15. Next, the Argentine champion and challenger Yaqui López faced-off in a 15-round title bout, once again in Italy, and Galíndez retained the title by a decision in Rome. Galíndez' last fight of '77 took him to Italy for a third time, and he beat future world champion Eddie Mustafa Muhammad (then Eddie Gregory) by a decision in fifteen.

In 1978, Galíndez went to Italy again, retaining the title with a fifteen-round decision in a rematch with Lopez, and then he made a series of non-title bouts in Argentina before he went on the road again, this time losing his title to Mike Rossman by a knockout in 13, in the same undercard where Muhammad Ali recovered the world Heavyweight title for the third time by beating Leon Spinks at the Louisiana Superdome in New Orleans.

After his first fight in 1979, beating Roberto Aguilar by a knockout in six back home, he and Rossman were supposed to have a rematch in February of that year, but Galíndez refused to fight, arguing that the judges selected for the rematch would probably favor Rossman. However, the rematch did come off later that year, and Galíndez recovered the world championship, once again in New Orleans, knocking Rossman out in 10 rounds. This time, however, he wouldn't last long as king of the Light Heavyweights, and he lost the title in his first defense, by a knockout in 11 to Marvin Johnson, a boxer who would later join Muhammad Ali, Sugar Ray Robinson and Carlos De León among others as one of the few boxers to be world champions three times in the same category. The fight with Johnson also took place in New Orleans.

He had a boxing record of 52 wins, 9 losses and 4 draws with 2 no contests, and 34 wins by knockout. He successfully defended the WBA world light heavyweight title ten times against seven boxers.

In 2002, Galíndez was inducted into the International Boxing Hall of Fame.

== Death ==
After losing a rematch with Burnett in 1980 by a decision in twelve in Anaheim, California, Galíndez was forced to retire because of two operations to repair his detached retinas, and then he tried to pursue his other dream of becoming a stock-car race driver. On 25 October of that year, he participated in what would be his first and last Turismo Carretera race, as a co-driver. After a mechanical failure shortly after the start of the race, Galíndez and his driver Antonio Lizeviche headed towards the pits, walking alongside the road. A car of another competitor lost control and hit Galíndez and Lizeviche, killing them on the spot.

== Professional boxing record ==
68 fights	55 wins	9 losses
By knockout	34	3
By decision	21	6
Draws	4	

No.	Result	Record	Opponent	Type	Round, time	Date	Location	Notes
70	Loss	55–9–4 (2)	Jesse Burnett	UD	12	Jun 14, 1980	Disneyland Hotel, Anaheim, California, US	
69	Loss	55–8–4 (2)	Marvin Johnson	KO	11 (15), 0:20	Nov 30, 1979	Superdome, New Orleans, Louisiana, US	Lost WBA light heavyweight title
68	Win	55–7–4 (2)	Mike Rossman	RTD	9 (15), 3:00	Apr 14, 1979	Superdome, New Orleans, Louisiana, US	Won WBA light heavyweight title
67	Win	54–7–4 (2)	Roberto Aguilar	RTD	8 (10)	Mar 9, 1979	San Miguel, Argentina	
66	Loss	53–7–4 (2)	Mike Rossman	TKO	13 (15), 0:55	Sep 15, 1978	Superdome, New Orleans, Louisiana, US	Lost WBA light heavyweight title
65	Win	53–6–4 (2)	Marcos Antonio Tosto	KO	6 (10)	Aug 19, 1978	General Pico, Argentina	
64	Win	52–6–4 (2)	Waldemar de Oliveira	KO	9 (10)	Jul 8, 1978	Estadio Luna Park, Buenos Aires, Argentina	
63	Win	51–6–4 (2)	Juan Antonio Musladino	KO	9 (10)	Jun 16, 1978	Ciudad Mendoza, Argentina	
62	Win	50–6–4 (2)	Yaqui López	UD	15	May 6, 1978	Lido di Camaiore, Italy	Retained WBA light heavyweight title
61	Win	49–6–4 (2)	Ramon Reinaldo Cerrezuela	PTS	10	Apr 8, 1978	Estadio Luna Park, Buenos Aires, Argentina	
60	Win	48–6–4 (2)	Eddie Mustafa Muhammad	UD	15	Nov 19, 1977	PalaRuffini, Torino, Italy	Retained WBA light heavyweight title
59	Win	47–6–4 (2)	Yaqui López	UD	15	Sep 17, 1977	Palazzetto dello Sport, Roma, Italy	Retained WBA light heavyweight title
58	Win	46–6–4 (2)	Ritchie Kates	UD	15	Jun 18, 1977	Palazzetto dello Sport, Roma, Italy	Retained WBA light heavyweight title
57	Win	45–6–4 (2)	Guillermo Aguirrezabala	KO	4 (10)	Apr 6, 1977	Ciudad Mendoza, Argentina	
56	Win	44–6–4 (2)	Kosie Smith	UD	15	Oct 5, 1976	Rand Stadium, Johannesburg, South Africa	Retained WBA light heavyweight title
55	Win	43–6–4 (2)	Billy Douglas	UD	10	Aug 21, 1976	Estadio Luna Park, Buenos Aires, Argentina	
54	Win	42–6–4 (2)	Richie Kates	KO	15 (15), 2:59	May 22, 1976	Rand Stadium, Johannesburg, South Africa	Retained WBA light heavyweight title
53	Win	41–6–4 (2)	Jesse Burnett	MD	10	Apr 8, 1976	Forum, Copenhagen, Denmark	
52	Win	40–6–4 (2)	Harald Skog	KO	3 (15), 1:45	Mar 28, 1976	Ekeberg Hall, Oslo, Norway	Retained WBA light heavyweight title
51	Win	39–6–4 (2)	Pierre Fourie	SD	15	Sep 13, 1975	Rand Stadium, Johannesburg, South Africa	Retained WBA light heavyweight title
50	Win	38–6–4 (2)	Jorge Ahumada	UD	15	Jun 30, 1975	Madison Square Garden, New York City, New York, US	Retained WBA light heavyweight title
49	Win	37–6–4 (2)	Ray Elson	TKO	8 (10), 1:34	May 16, 1975	Convention Center, Las Vegas, Nevada, US	
48	Win	36–6–4 (2)	Pierre Fourie	UD	15	Apr 7, 1975	Ellis Park Rugby Stadium, Johannesburg, South Africa	Retained WBA light heavyweight title
47	Win	35–6–4 (2)	Johnny Griffin	KO	6 (10)	Feb 15, 1975	Balcarce, Argentina	
46	Win	34–6–4 (2)	Len Hutchins	RTD	12 (15), 3:00	Dec 7, 1974	Estadio Luna Park, Buenos Aires, Argentina	Won vacant WBA light heavyweight title
45	Win	33–6–4 (2)	Domingo Silveira	KO	4 (10)	Oct 5, 1974	Parana, Argentina	
44	Win	32–6–4 (2)	Angel Oquendo	PTS	10	Sep 14, 1974	Estadio Luna Park, Buenos Aires, Argentina	
43	Win	31–6–4 (2)	Domingo Silveira	KO	5 (10)	Sep 1, 1974	San Juan, Argentina	
42	Win	30–6–4 (2)	Domingo Silveira	KO	4 (10)	Jul 12, 1974	San Salvador de Jujuy, Argentina	
41	Win	29–6–4 (2)	Jose Gonzalez	UD	10	Jun 8, 1974	Estadio Luna Park, Buenos Aires, Argentina	
40	Win	28–6–4 (2)	Ruben Macario Gonzalez	KO	3 (10)	Apr 5, 1974	Rio Cuarto, Argentina	
39	Win	27–6–4 (2)	Ray Anderson	KO	2 (10), 1:23	Feb 16, 1974	Balcarce, Argentina	
38	Win	26–6–4 (2)	Eddie Duncan	KO	2 (10)	Dec 8, 1973	San Miguel, Argentina	
37	Win	25–6–4 (2)	Raul Arturo Loyola	TKO	8 (10)	Nov 10, 1973	San Miguel, Argentina	
36	Win	24–6–4 (2)	Raul Arturo Loyola	PTS	12	Sep 7, 1973	San Miguel, Argentina	Retained Argentine light heavyweight title
35	Win	23–6–4 (2)	Juan Aguilar	KO	6 (10)	Aug 10, 1973	San Miguel, Argentina	
34	Win	22–6–4 (2)	Karl Zurheide	KO	2 (10)	Jul 14, 1973	Estadio Luna Park, Buenos Aires, Argentina	
33	Win	21–6–4 (2)	Eddie Owens	KO	3 (10)	May 12, 1973	Estadio Luna Park, Buenos Aires, Argentina	
32	Win	20–6–4 (2)	Juan Aguilar	PTS	12	Apr 14, 1973	Estadio Luna Park, Buenos Aires, Argentina	Retained Argentine light heavyweight title
31	Win	19–6–4 (2)	Ruben Macario Gonzalez	KO	3 (10)	Jan 29, 1973	Salta, Argentina	
30	Draw	18–6–4 (2)	Juan Aguilar	PTS	10	Dec 15, 1972	Ciudad Mendoza, Argentina	
29	Win	18–6–3 (2)	Oscar Wondryk	KO	7 (10)	Nov 10, 1972	Venado Tuerto, Argentina	
28	Win	17–6–3 (2)	Avenamar Peralta	PTS	12	Oct 7, 1972	Estadio Luna Park, Buenos Aires, Argentina	Won vacant South American light heavyweight title
27	Win	16–6–3 (2)	Avenamar Peralta	PTS	12	Sep 2, 1972	Estadio Luna Park, Buenos Aires, Argentina	Won Argentine light heavyweight title
26	Win	15–6–3 (2)	Adolfo Jorge Cardozo	RTD	4 (10)	Aug 19, 1972	Teatro Real, Rosario, Argentina	
25	Win	14–6–3 (2)	Juan Aguilar	PTS	12	Jul 22, 1972	Estadio Luna Park, Buenos Aires, Argentina	Won Argentine light heavyweight title
24	Win	13–6–3 (2)	Eddie Jones	PTS	10	May 6, 1972	Estadio Luna Park, Buenos Aires, Argentina	
23	Win	12–6–3 (2)	Carlos A. Santagada	RTD	8 (10)	Jan 22, 1972	Nueve de Julio, Argentina	
22	Loss	11–6–3 (2)	Avenamar Peralta	PTS	10	Dec 18, 1971	Estadio Luna Park, Buenos Aires, Argentina	
21	Win	11–5–3 (2)	Juan Aguilar	PTS	10	Nov 20, 1971	Estadio Luna Park, Buenos Aires, Argentina	
20	Win	10–5–3 (2)	Jorge Ahumada	KO	6 (10)	Oct 30, 1971	Estadio Luna Park, Buenos Aires, Argentina	
19	Loss	9–5–3 (2)	Avenamar Peralta	TKO	9 (10)	Sep 11, 1971	Estadio Luna Park, Buenos Aires, Argentina	
18	Win	9–4–3 (2)	Jorge Ahumada	KO	9 (10)	Jul 31, 1971	Estadio Luna Park, Buenos Aires, Argentina	
17	Draw	8–4–3 (2)	Pedro Rimovsky	PTS	10	Jun 12, 1971	Estadio Luna Park, Buenos Aires, Argentina	
16	Loss	8–4–2 (2)	Jorge Ahumada	PTS	10	May 24, 1971	Ciudad Mendoza, Argentina	
15	NC	8–3–2 (2)	Pedro Rimovsky	NC	1 (10)	Apr 7, 1971	Estadio Luna Park, Buenos Aires, Argentina	
14	Win	8–3–2 (1)	Avenamar Peralta	PTS	10	Jan 9, 1971	Estadio Luna Park, Buenos Aires, Argentina	
13	Loss	7–3–2 (1)	Avenamar Peralta	PTS	12	Nov 28, 1970	Estadio Luna Park, Buenos Aires, Argentina	For Argentine light heavyweight title
12	Loss	7–2–2 (1)	Juan Aguilar	PTS	10	Sep 18, 1970	Ciudad Mendoza, Argentina	
11	NC	7–1–2 (1)	Juan Aguilar	NC	1 (10)	Aug 14, 1970	Ciudad Mendoza, Argentina	
10	Win	7–1–2	Jorge Ahumada	KO	5 (10)	Jul 22, 1970	Estadio Luna Park, Buenos Aires, Argentina	
9	Draw	6–1–2	Juan Aguilar	PTS	10	Jun 24, 1970	Estadio Luna Park, Buenos Aires, Argentina	
8	Win	6–1–1	Alfredo Segura	KO	3 (10)	May 20, 1970	Estadio Luna Park, Buenos Aires, Argentina	
7	Win	5–1–1	Ramon Reinaldo Cerrezuela	TKO	9 (10)	May 9, 1970	Lujan, Argentina	
6	Loss	4–1–1	Juan Aguilar	PTS	10	Apr 8, 1970	Estadio Luna Park, Buenos Aires, Argentina	
5	Win	4–0–1	Ramon Rocha	KO	9 (10)	Mar 13, 1970	Rosario, Argentina	
4	Win	3–0–1	Adolfo Jorge Cardozo	KO	5 (6)	Jan 17, 1970	Estadio Luna Park, Buenos Aires, Argentina	
3	Draw	2–0–1	Adolfo Cejas	PTS	10	Aug 16, 1969	Azul, Argentina	
2	Win	2–0	Ruperto Robledo	KO	3 (6)	Jun 28, 1969	Estadio Luna Park, Buenos Aires, Argentina	
1	Win	1–0	Ramon Ruiz	KO	4 (6)	May 10, 1969	Estadio Luna Park, Buenos Aires, Argentina	

== Notes ==
Achievements
Preceded by Bob Foster; Retired	WBA Light Heavyweight Champion; 7 Dec 1974 – 15 Sep 1978	Succeeded by Mike Rossman
Preceded by Mike Rossman	WBA Light Heavyweight Champion; 14 April – 30 November 1979	Succeeded by Marvin Johnson
Light heavyweight status
Preceded by Dick Tiger	Latest born world champion to die October 26, 1980 – July 29, 2008	Succeeded by Mate Parlov
