= Murad Muhammad =

American boxing promoter

Murad Muhammad is an American boxing promoter, the owner of the company M & M Sports.

Murad's introduction to boxing was through traveling the world with Muhammad Ali. He was only 16 then and for 10 years, he was Ali's personal security man.

He became the first African American to receive a promoter's license in the State of New Jersey in the mid-1970s. Muhammad was the first promoter to have a professional boxing show held and televised behind prison walls when HBO televised a fight out of Rahway State Prison between prisoner and ranked fighter, James Scott, against contender, Eddie ”The Flame” Gregory later known as Eddie Mustafa Muhammad. He is also credited with bringing the first Heavyweight Championship bout featuring Larry Holmes vs. Scott Frank, to New Jersey in 50 years. He had the highest audience share for a network boxing event on NBC with Larry Holmes vs. Marvis Frazier (49% show prime time)

His remaining name fighter was a 43-year-old Evander Holyfield who he promoted in his comeback attempt but took a bath in his fight against Fres Oquendo. Holyfield was paid $2 million for the Oquendo fight which the live gate in the range of $400,000 and meager PPV sales couldn't refinance.
