= Jesse Burnett =

American boxer

Personal information
- Born: 8 February 1946 (age 80) Los Angeles, California, US
- Height: 1.82 m (6 ft 0 in)
- Weight: Light heavyweight

Boxing career
- Stance: Orthodox

Boxing record
- Total fights: 44
- Wins: 25
- Win by KO: 13
- Losses: 17
- Draws: 2

Jesse Burnett (born February 8, 1946) is an American former professional boxer. His professional record was 23-18-2 with 11 knockouts. He is best remembered as the spoiler who won a twelve-round decision in a WBC cruiserweight elimination bout over former world light-heavyweight champion Victor Galindez of Argentina in 1980, sending Galindez into retirement. In Burnett's two tries at a world title, he was stopped in the ninth round of a 1977 vacant WBC light-heavyweight title bout by Miguel Angel Cuello, and stopped in the eighth round of a 1983 WBC cruiserweight title bout against S.T. Gordon. Burnett also fought such other fighters as former heavyweight champion Leon Spinks, former light-heavyweight champion John Conteh (Burnett earned a ten-round draw), former light-heavyweight champion Eddie Mustafa Muhammad, and other contenders such as Yaqui Lopez, James Scott, Jerry Martin, Tony Mundine, Bash Ali, Willie Edwards, Mustafa Wassaja, Willie Edwards, Lotte Mwale, and many others.

== Professional boxing record ==
23 Wins (11 knockouts, 12 decisions), 18 Losses (4 knockouts, 14 decisions), 2 Draws
Result	Record	Opponent	Type	Round	Date	Location	Notes
Loss	15-2	Anthony Davis	UD	12	16/05/1984	Las Vegas, Nevada, U.S.	NABF Cruiserweight Title.
Loss	22-5	S.T. Gordon	TKO	8	16/02/1983	East Rutherford, New Jersey, U.S.	WBC Cruiserweight Title. Referee stopped the bout at 3:07 of the eighth round.
Loss	11-3-2	Leon Spinks	UD	12	31/10/1982	McAfee, New Jersey, U.S.	NABF Cruiserweight Title.
Win	29-5-1	Steve Aczel	TKO	8	19/02/1982	Brisbane, Queensland, Australia	
Loss	10-0	Willie Edwards	PTS	10	16/01/1982	Detroit, Michigan, U.S.	
Loss	16-14-1	James Williams	SD	10	13/10/1981	Stateline, Nevada, U.S.	
Win	75-10-1	Tony Mundine	PTS	12	04/03/1981	Auckland, New Zealand	
Loss	11-5	Bash Ali	SD	12	03/12/1980	Anaheim, California, U.S.	IBF USBA Cruiserweight Title.
Win	0-3-1	T.C. Bowman	TKO	6	15/07/1980	Anaheim, California, U.S.	
Win	55-8-4	Victor Galindez	UD	12	14/06/1980	Anaheim, California, U.S.	
Loss	20-7-1	Dale Grant	KO	7	19/04/1980	Billings, Montana, U.S.	
Loss	19-0	Lottie Mwale	PTS	12	04/03/1980	London, England	
Win	13-8-2	Clarence Geigger	PTS	10	14/12/1979	Costa Mesa, California, U.S.	
Loss	17-0	Eddie Taylor	PTS	10	24/11/1979	Bloomington, Minnesota, U.S.	
Loss	16-1	Jerry Martin	UD	12	14/11/1979	Philadelphia, Pennsylvania, U.S.	NABF/IBF USBA Light Heavyweight Titles.
Draw	32-2	John Conteh	PTS	10	19/04/1979	London, England	
Win	3-9-1	Juan de la Garza	TKO	6	28/11/1978	Billings, Montana, U.S.	
Loss	7-9-1	Pete McIntyre	SD	10	08/11/1978	Stockton, California, U.S.	
Loss	42-7	Yaqui Lopez	MD	15	02/07/1978	Stockton, California, U.S.	
Loss	12-0-1	Mustafa Wasajja	PTS	10	25/05/1978	Copenhagen, Denmark	
Loss	22-3-1	Eddie Mustafa Muhammad	TKO	10	15/02/1978	Las Vegas, Nevada, U.S.	Referee stopped the bout at 1:59 of the tenth round.
Win	29-3	Lonnie Bennett	TKO	6	18/11/1977	Las Vegas, Nevada, U.S.	
Loss	20-0	Miguel Angel Cuello	TKO	9	21/05/1977	Monte Carlo, Monaco	WBC Light Heavyweight Title.
Win	16-11-1	Al Bolden	KO	10	20/03/1977	Tokyo, Japan	
Win	44-33-1	Bobby Rascon	TKO	4	19/12/1976	Tokyo, Japan	Referee stopped the bout at 2:18 of the fourth round.
Win	29-14-3	Eddie Jones	UD	10	10/07/1976	San Diego, California, U.S.	
Win	11-4-3	Willie Taylor	PTS	10	03/06/1976	Copenhagen, Denmark	
Win	52-6-1	Tony Mundine	KO	6	14/05/1976	Brisbane, Australia	Mundine knocked out at 1:06 of the sixth round.
Win	10-7-1	Danny Brewer	KO	7	03/05/1976	Stockton, California, U.S.	
Loss	40-6-4	Victor Galindez	SD	10	08/04/1976	Copenhagen, Denmark	
Win	8-5	Danny Brewer	KO	3	28/11/1975	Edmonton, Alberta, Canada	Brewer knocked out at 0:45 of the third round.
Loss	26-3	Yaqui Lopez	SD	12	24/09/1975	Stockton, California, U.S.	California Light Heavyweight Title.
Win	26-2	Yaqui Lopez	SD	12	31/07/1975	Stockton, California, U.S.	California Light Heavyweight Title.
Loss	9-0-1	James Scott	UD	10	25/02/1975	Miami Beach, Florida, U.S.	
Win	39-13-5	Ray White	KO	8	15/03/1974	San Diego, California, U.S.	
Win	6-5-4	Felton Marshall	TD	9	09/08/1973	Los Angeles, California, U.S.	
Win	41-18-3	Jimmy Lester	PTS	10	08/02/1973	Los Angeles, California, U.S.	
Win	57-17-6	Ron Wilson	PTS	10	19/10/1972	Los Angeles, California, U.S.	
Win	15-1-1	Hildo Silva	PTS	6	24/07/1972	Inglewood, California, U.S.	
Win	3-0	Yaqui Lopez	PTS	8	01/07/1972	Stockton, California, U.S.	
Win	0-1	Steve Stark	KO	4	05/06/1972	San Diego, California, U.S.	
Win	3-0	Angel Baggini	PTS	6	24/04/1972	Inglewood, California, U.S.	
Draw	4-1	Cisco Solorio	TD	1	13/04/1972	Los Angeles, California, U.S.	
