= Mike Morgan (boxer) =

American boxer

Mike Morgan is a retired professional middleweight boxer from Minneapolis, Minnesota.

== Professional career ==
Morgan made his professional boxing debut on October 10, 1970 with a four-round points win against 6-2 Chuck Hernandez. Morgan remained unbeaten through five matches, losing for the first time to Frank Foramero in May 1971. Later Morgan would box his way to a draw against 12-5-3 Frank Jiminez, then a win against Jiminez, then 13-7-5. Morgan had run his record to 12-1-2 when he was given the opportunity to fight Rudy Rodriguez for the vacant Minnesota state middleweight championship in August 1973. Morgan would defeat Rodriguez by split decision to gain the title, and then rematched Rodriguez two months later, again winning by split decision. In May 1974 Morgan put his 14-1 record on the line against Rodriguez's younger brother, Rafael Rodriguez, this time fighting for the Minnesota light middleweight title. This fight would headline a fight card that included future stars Scott LeDoux, Doug Demmings, and Gary Holmgren on the undercard, but it would end badly for Morgan when Rodriguez knocked him out in the first round. In his next bout Morgan faced unbeaten prospect Mike Rossman at Madison Square Garden in New York City, losing by unanimous decision in eight rounds. Thereafter Morgan would lose more often than he won, finally retiring from boxing after putting together a three-fight winning streak in 1978. At the time of his retirement Morgan had compiled a professional record of 20-11 with 5 wins by knockout.
