= Pierre Fourie =

South African boxer

Personal information
- Nationality: South African
- Born: Pierre Jacy Fourie; June 26, 1943 Malvern Johannesburg
- Died: June 21, 1980 (aged 36) Johannesburg, Gauteng, South Africa
- Height: 6 ft 1 1/2 in (1.87 m)
- Weight: Light heavyweight

Boxing career

Boxing record
- Total fights: 60
- Wins: 52
- Win by KO: 10
- Losses: 7
- Draws: 1

Pierre Jacy Fourie was a South African boxer. He was the undefeated middle and light heavyweight South African champion and held both titles at the same time. He retired from the ring in 1977. He died on 21 June 1980, at age 36 in a motor vehicle accident at Cecil Payne Park in Roodepoort South Africa. He was the first white boxer in Apartheid South Africa to fight against a non-white opponent, American Bob Foster on 21 August 1973 in South Africa.

== Career ==
Trained by Alan Toweel, Pierre joined the professional boxing ranks on 2 May 1966. He won his very first fight with a knockout in the first round. The partnership between Fourie and Toweel, one of the most successful in the history of South African boxing, continued throughout the eleven years of Fourie's career as a boxer. In his 60 professional fights, Fourie distinguished himself as a hard but clean and scientific boxer rather than a rough fighter.

He beat Johnny Wood twice and Willie Ludick to retain his South African middleweight title and was undefeated. He moved into the light heavyweight division. He fought Sarel Aucamp twice to retain his South African light heavyweight title and was undefeated. He fought Bob Foster for the WBC light heavyweight title and WBA World light heavyweight title twice and Victor Galíndez for the WBA World light heavyweight title twice. He lost these on points. His last fight was contentious and many believed he had won. Ironically, Galindez also died in a motor vehicle crash, only 4 months after Fourie.

He gained 52 victories, Fourie was beaten on points: by Foster on 21 August 1973 in Albuquerque (USA) and on 1 December 1973 in the Rand Stadium; by Galíndez on 5 April 1975 at Ellis Park (Johannesburg) and on 13 September 1975 in the Rand Stadium. The second fight between Fourie and Foster on 1 December 1973 was the first between a white and black boxer in South Africa and constituted a breakthrough for the removal of racial discrimination in professional boxing and other sports. At the time the attendance figure of 37,4704 spectators, the gate money of approximately R500,000, and the guaranteed purse of $200,000 to Foster, were world records for the light heavyweight division.

In his last fight in March 1977, he fought Gerrie Coetzee for the South African heavyweight title and lost.
