= Leon Spinks vs. Muhammad Ali II =

September 1978 boxing match

Battle of New Orleans
- Date: September 15, 1978
- Venue: Superdome, New Orleans, Louisiana, U.S.
- Titles on the line: WBA and The Ring heavyweight titles

Tale of the tape
| Boxer | Leon Spinks | Muhammad Ali |
| Nickname | Neon | The Greatest |
| Hometown | St. Louis, Missouri, U.S. | Louisville, Kentucky, U.S. |
| Purse | $3,750,000 | $3,250,000 |
| Pre-fight record | 7–0–1 (5 KO) | 55–3 (37 KO) |
| Age | 25 years, 2 months | 36 years, 7 months |
| Height | 6 ft 1 in (185 cm) | 6 ft 3 in (191 cm) |
| Weight | 201 lb (91 kg) | 221 lb (100 kg) |
| Style | Orthodox | Orthodox |
| Recognition | WBA and The Ring; Heavyweight Champion | WBA; No. 3 Ranked Heavyweight; Three-time undisputed heavyweight champion |

Result
- Ali wins via 15-round unanimous decision (10-4, 11-4, 10-4)

Leon Spinks vs. Muhammad Ali II, billed as Battle of New Orleans, was a professional boxing match contested on September 15, 1978, in New Orleans for the WBA and The Ring heavyweight championships.

== Background ==
After his shock win over Muhammad Ali to become Heavyweight champion, Leon Spinks was stripped of the WBC belt for not facing its number one ranked contender Ken Norton; instead he agreed to a rematch with Ali. Ali entered the rematch as a 2½ to 1 favorite. The fight was held at the Louisiana Superdome, with ringside seats costing $200 (equivalent to $987 in 2025). The card contained three other world title fights: WBA Bantamweight Champion Jorge Luján vs. future WBC champion Alberto Davila; WBC Featherweight Champion Danny Lopez vs. Juan Malvarez; and WBA Light Heavyweight Champion Víctor Galíndez vs. Mike Rossman.

ABC paid $5.3 million ($25.89 million in 2025 dollars) for the rights to televise the fight live in the United States. The broadcast was blacked out in the entire state of Louisiana (except Monroe; KTVE, northeast Louisiana's ABC affiliate at the time--now affiliated with NBC--is licensed in El Dorado, Arkansas, and was not subjected to the blackout) and markets within 200 miles of the Superdome, which included Jackson, Mississippi, Mobile, Alabama, and Pensacola, Florida.

== The fight ==
Pat Putnam of Sports Illustrated wrote:

The plan was simple. Ali would jab, jab, throw a right and grab. When Spinks came flailing in, Ali would hook his left hand around the back of Spinks' head and pull him into an embrace, effectively limiting Spinks to one or two punches or pulling him off balance. And Ali would dance, baby, dance. He would tie up Spinks and then dance away from him on the break, circling to the right, circling to the left. And the fight went as plotted.

Referee Lucien Joubert took the fifth round away from Ali for holding. The Associated Press scored the fight 12–3 for Ali, while the three judges had the bout 11–4, 10–4–1 and 10–4–1 all in favor of Ali giving him a unanimous decision win.

== Attendance and viewership ==
The Superdome attendance was 63,352, which, at the time, was the largest indoor attendance ever for a boxing match. Ticket sales of $4,806,675 ($20.168 million in 2021 dollars) was the highest live gate for a sporting event at the time. The average ticket price was $75.87 ($318.34 in 2021 dollars).

An estimated audience of 90 million viewers watched the main event in the United States, with 46.7% of TV sets in the nation tuned in—a record for the time. The fight was estimated to have been watched by a record 2 billion viewers worldwide.

== Aftermath ==
Ali regained the WBA heavyweight title and avenged his split decision loss to Spinks from seven months prior. He also became the first man to win the World Heavyweight Championship three times.

In June 1979, Ali sent an official letter of retirement to the WBA. Promoter Bob Arum said he paid Ali $300,000 to announce his retirement because Ali's reluctance had delayed the scheduling of a fight between John Tate and Gerrie Coetzee for the vacant WBA title. "We knew Muhammad Ali was going to retire", Arum said, "but as long as he delayed, I couldn't make definite plans." However, in October 1980 Ali returned to face WBC Champion Larry Holmes but was stopped by TKO in the 10th round. He then retired for good after a lackluster loss to Trevor Berbick in December 1981 (one month before Ali's 40th birthday), the final fight of Ali's career.

== Undercard ==
Confirmed bouts:

| Winner | Loser | Weight division/title belt(s) disputed | Result |
|---|---|---|---|
| (United States) Mike Rossman | (Argentina) Víctor Galíndez | WBA World Light Heavyweight Title | 13th-round TKO. |
| (United States) Danny Lopez | (Argentina) Juan Domingo Malvarez | WBC World Featherweight Title | 2nd-round KO. |
| (Panama) Jorge Lujan | (United States) Alberto Davila | WBA World Bantamweight Title | Unanimous decision. |
| (United States) Marvin Johnson | (United States) Jerry Celestine | Light Heavyweight (10 rounds) | Unanimous decision. |
| (Romania) Mircea Șimon | (United States) David Wynne | Heavyweight (4 rounds) | 1st-round KO. |

== Broadcasting ==
| Country | Broadcaster |
|---|---|
| Australia | Nine Network |
| Brazil | Band |
| Canada | CTV |
| France | TF1 |
| Germany | ARD |
| Japan | TBS |
| Mexico | Televisa |
| Philippines | RPN 9 |
| Spain | TVE |
| United Kingdom | ITV |
| United States | ABC |

| Preceded by First bout | Leon Spinks's bouts 15 September 1978 | Succeeded by vs. Gerrie Coetzee |
| Preceded by First bout | Muhammad Ali's bouts 15 September 1978 | Succeeded by vs. Larry Holmes |
