= Santa Rosa, Salta =

Coordinates: 24°16′S 62°44′W

Santa Rosa (Salta)
- Municipality and village
- Interactive map of Santa Rosa (Salta)
- Country: Argentina
- Province: Salta Province
- Time zone: UTC−3 (ART)

Santa Rosa (Salta) is a village and rural municipality in Salta Province in northwestern Argentina.
