= Angelo Rottoli =

Italian boxer (1958–2020)

Personal information
- Nickname: Ali
- Nationality: Italian
- Born: 14 December 1958 Presezzo, Lombardy, Italy
- Died: 29 March 2020 (aged 61) Ponte San Pietro, Lombardy, Italy
- Height: 6 ft 1 in (185 cm)
- Weight: Cruiserweight; Heavyweight

Boxing career
- Stance: Orthodox

Boxing record
- Total fights: 34
- Wins: 29
- Win by KO: 15
- Losses: 3
- Draws: 2

Angelo Rottoli (14 December 1958 – 29 March 2020) was an Italian professional boxer. He held the European cruiserweight title in 1989 and challenged once for the WBC cruiserweight title in 1987.

Rottoli died at the age of 61 after contracting COVID-19.
