= John Conteh =

British boxer (born 1951)

John Conteh MBE
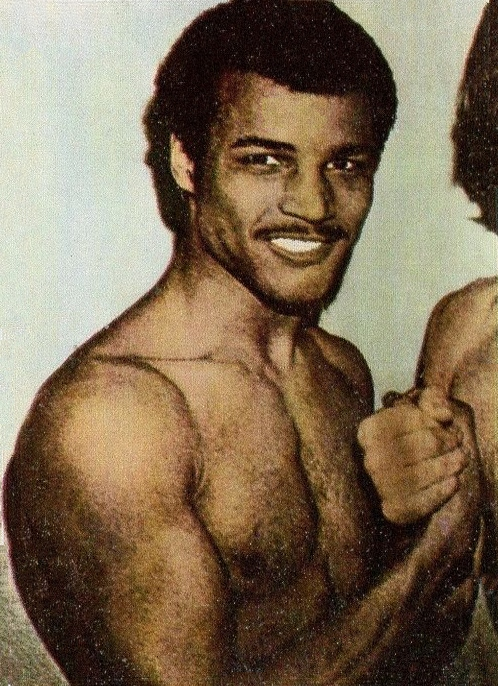
- Conteh c. 1973

Personal information
- Nationality: British
- Born: 27 May 1951 (age 75) Toxteth, Liverpool, Lancashire, England
- Height: 6 ft 0 in (183 cm)
- Weight: Light-heavyweight; Cruiserweight; Heavyweight

Boxing career
- Reach: 76 in (193 cm)
- Stance: Orthodox

Boxing record
- Total fights: 39
- Wins: 34
- Win by KO: 24
- Losses: 4
- Draws: 1
Medal record
Representing England
British Commonwealth Games
Gold medal – first place	1970 Edinburgh	Middleweight

John Anthony Conteh, MBE (born 27 May 1951) is a British former professional boxer who competed from 1971 to 1980. He held the WBC light-heavyweight title from 1974 to 1977, and regionally the European, British and Commonwealth titles between 1973 and 1974. As an amateur, he represented England and won a gold medal in the middleweight division at the 1970 British Commonwealth Games. In 2017, Conteh was awarded an MBE for services to boxing at the Queen's Birthday Honours.

== Professional career ==
Born in Liverpool, Lancashire (now Merseyside), to an Irish mother and Sierra Leonean father, Conteh began boxing at the age of 10 at a boxing club in Kirkby that was a training ground for fellow British amateurs Joey Singleton and Tucker Hetherington. At 19, he won the middleweight gold medal at the 1970 British Commonwealth Games. He won the WBC light-heavyweight title in October 1974 by defeating Jorge Ahumada. He held the title until 1977 when he was stripped for not going through with a mandatory defence.

Conteh lost a 15-round split decision to the Yugoslavian fighter Mate Parlov when he attempted to regain the title. He failed twice in further efforts to win back the crown, in 1979 and then again seven months later in 1980, on both occasions fighting the American Matthew Saad Muhammad. Muhammad won both bouts but the first victory was controversial.

== Appearances outside boxing ==
Conteh was one of the celebrities featured dressed in prison gear on the cover of the 1973 Wings album, Band on the Run. He was the subject of This Is Your Life in 1974.

Conteh was the British Superstars competition champion in 1974, the second year of the televised sporting event. Conteh is now an after-dinner speaker.

Conteh appeared on the BBC television programme Sporting Legends which was presented by Eamonn Holmes. There he spoke at length at how he started out in boxing and how Ali persuaded him to fight at light-heavyweight instead of heavyweight. Ali believed that Conteh was too small to be a heavyweight. Conteh also spoke of how his lifestyle led to alcoholism and a charge of assault; he stated that at the time he appeared on Sporting Legends he had been dry for nine years.

Conteh appeared in films Man at the Top (1973), The Stud (1978) and Tank Malling (1989), and made a starring appearance in the television show Boon in 1989, as a washed-up boxer. He appeared on a boxing special of The Weakest Link in 2009, where he finished in third place. His most recent TV acting appearance was in the crime drama Justice, in which he again played an ex-boxer.

Conteh was appointed Member of the Order of the British Empire (MBE) in the 2017 Birthday Honours for services to boxing.

Conteh appeared in a celebrity episode of The Chase in 2024.

== Professional boxing record ==
39 fights	34 wins	4 losses
By knockout	24	1
By decision	10	3
Draws	1	

No.	Result	Record	Opponent	Type	Round, time	Date	Location	Notes
39	Win	34–4–1	(United States) James Dixon	TKO	5 (10), 2:49	31 May 1980	(United Kingdom) Liverpool Stadium, Liverpool, England	
38	Loss	33–4–1	(United States) Matthew Saad Muhammad	TKO	4 (15), 2:27	29 Mar 1980	(United States) Steel Pier, Atlantic City, New Jersey, US	For WBC and The Ring light-heavyweight titles
37	Loss	33–3–1	(United States) Matthew Saad Muhammad	UD	15	18 Aug 1979	(United States) Steel Pier, Atlantic City, New Jersey, US	For WBC light-heavyweight title
36	Win	33–2–1	(United States) Ivy Brown	PTS	10	4 Jun 1979	(United Kingdom) Liverpool, England	
35	Draw	32–2–1	(United States) Jesse Burnett	PTS	10	19 Apr 1979	(United Kingdom) Hilton on Park Lane, London, England	
34	Win	32–2	(Dominican Republic) Leonardo Rodgers	KO	7 (10), 1:15	26 Sep 1978	(United Kingdom) Empire Pool, London, England	
33	Loss	31–2	(Socialist Federal Republic of Yugoslavia) Mate Parlov	SD	15	17 Jun 1978	(Socialist Federal Republic of Yugoslavia) Red Star Stadium, Belgrade, Yugoslavia	For WBC light-heavyweight title
32	Win	31–1	(United States) Joe Cokes	PTS	10	7 Feb 1978	(United Kingdom) Michael Sobell Sports Centre, London, England	
31	Win	30–1	(United States) Len Hutchins	TKO	3 (15), 1:05	5 Mar 1977	(United Kingdom) Liverpool Stadium, Liverpool, England	Retained WBC light-heavyweight title
30	Win	29–1	(Mexico) Yaqui López	UD	15	9 Oct 1976	Forum, Copenhagen, Denmark	Retained WBC light-heavyweight title
29	Win	28–1	(United States) Willie Taylor	UD	10	16 Aug 1975	(United States) Catholic Youth Center, Scranton, Pennsylvania, US	
28	Win	27–1	(United States) Lonnie Bennett	TKO	5 (15), 1:10	11 Mar 1975	(United Kingdom) Empire Pool, London, England	Retained WBC light-heavyweight title
27	Win	26–1	(Argentina) Jorge Ahumada	PTS	15	1 Oct 1974	(United Kingdom) Empire Pool, London, England	Won vacant WBC light-heavyweight title
26	Win	25–1	(United Kingdom) Chris Finnegan	TKO	6 (15)	21 May 1974	(United Kingdom) Empire Pool, London, England	Retained European, British, and Commonwealth light-heavyweight titles
25	Win	24–1	(Denmark) Tom Bogs	RTD	6 (15)	12 Mar 1974	(United Kingdom) Empire Pool, London, England	Retained European light-heavyweight title
24	Win	23–1	(United Kingdom) Les Stevens	PTS	10	12 Feb 1974	(United Kingdom) Royal Albert Hall, London, England	
23	Win	22–1	(United States) Fred Lewis	TKO	3 (10)	14 Dec 1973	(United Kingdom) Liverpool Stadium, Liverpool, England	
22	Win	21–1	(The Bahamas) Baby Boy Rolle	PTS	15	23 Oct 1973	(United Kingdom) National Ice Centre, Nottingham, England	Retained Commonwealth light-heavyweight title
21	Win	20–1	(Venezuela) Vicente Rondón	TKO	9 (10)	10 Sep 1973	(United Kingdom) Empire Pool, London, England	
20	Win	19–1	(United Kingdom) Chris Finnegan	PTS	15	22 May 1973	(United Kingdom) Empire Pool, London, England	Retained European light-heavyweight title; Won British and Commonwealth light-heavyweight titles
19	Win	18–1	(West Germany) Rüdiger Schmidtke	TKO	12 (15), 2:28	13 Mar 1973	(United Kingdom) Empire Pool, London, England	Won European light-heavyweight title
18	Win	17–1	(United States) Terry Daniels	TKO	7 (10)	14 Feb 1973	(United States) Las Vegas Convention Center, Winchester, Nevada, US	
17	Win	16–1	(United States) Dave Matthews	PTS	10	15 Jan 1973	(United Kingdom) Ice Stadium, Nottingham, England	
16	Win	15–1	(United States) Sam McGill	TKO	9 (10)	5 Dec 1972	(United Kingdom) Royal Albert Hall, London, England	
15	Win	14–1	(United States) John Hudgins	KO	3 (10), 1:30	14 Nov 1972	(United Kingdom) Empire Pool, London, England	
14	Win	13–1	(Canada) Bill Drover	KO	7 (10), 2:24	31 Oct 1972	(United Kingdom) Royal Albert Hall, London, England	
13	Win	12–1	(Hungary) Ferenc Kristofcsak	TKO	1 (8)	10 Oct 1972	(United Kingdom) Royal Albert Hall, London, England	
12	Loss	11–1	(United States) Eddie Duncan	PTS	10	26 Sep 1972	(United Kingdom) Empire Pool, London, England	
11	Win	11–0	(United States) Johnny Mac	TKO	2 (8)	19 Jul 1972	(Republic of Ireland) Croke Park, Dublin, Ireland	
10	Win	10–0	(United Kingdom) Billy Aird	TKO	8 (8)	6 Jun 1972	(United Kingdom) Royal Albert Hall, London, England	
9	Win	9–0	(United States) Joe Gholston	TKO	5 (8)	25 Apr 1972	(United Kingdom) Royal Albert Hall, London, England	
8	Win	8–0	(Puerto Rico) Ruben Figueroa	KO	2 (8)	28 Mar 1972	(United Kingdom) Empire Pool, London, England	
7	Win	7–0	(United States) Larry Sykes	KO	1 (8)	15 Feb 1972	(United Kingdom) Royal Albert Hall, London, England	
6	Win	6–0	(West Germany) Wilhelm Janco	TKO	1 (8)	25 Jan 1972	(United Kingdom) Royal Albert Hall, London, England	
5	Win	5–0	(France) Emilio Okee	TKO	5 (8)	7 Dec 1971	(United Kingdom) Royal Albert Hall, London, England	
4	Win	4–0	(United States) Tony Burwell	PTS	8	24 Nov 1971	(United Kingdom) National Ice Centre, Nottingham, England	
3	Win	3–0	(Canada) Frank Bullard	TKO	2 (10)	16 Nov 1971	(United Kingdom) Empire Pool, London, England	
2	Win	2–0	(France) Pierre Minier	TKO	5 (8)	8 Nov 1971	(United Kingdom) Grosvenor House Hotel, London, England	
1	Win	1–0	(France) Okacha Boubekeur	KO	1 (8)	18 Oct 1971	(United Kingdom) Hotel Café Royal, London, England	

Sporting positions
Amateur boxing titles
Previous: Dave Wallington	ABA middleweight champion 1970	Next: Alan Minter
Regional boxing titles
Preceded by Rüdiger Schmidtke	European light-heavyweight champion 13 March 1973 – October 1974; Vacated	Vacant Title next held by Domenico Adinolfi
Preceded by Chris Finnegan	British light-heavyweight champion 22 May 1973 – October 1974; Vacated	Vacant Title next held by Johnny Frankham
Preceded by Chris Finnegan	Commonwealth light-heavyweight champion 22 May 1973 – October 1974; Vacated	Vacant Title next held by Steve Aczel
World boxing titles
Vacant Title last held by Bob Foster	WBC light-heavyweight champion 1 October 1974 – 21 March 1977	Vacant Title next held by Miguel Ángel Cuello
Light heavyweight status
Preceded by Bob Foster	Oldest living world champion 21 November 2015 – present	Incumbent
