= Eddie Mustafa Muhammad =

American boxer, boxing trainer

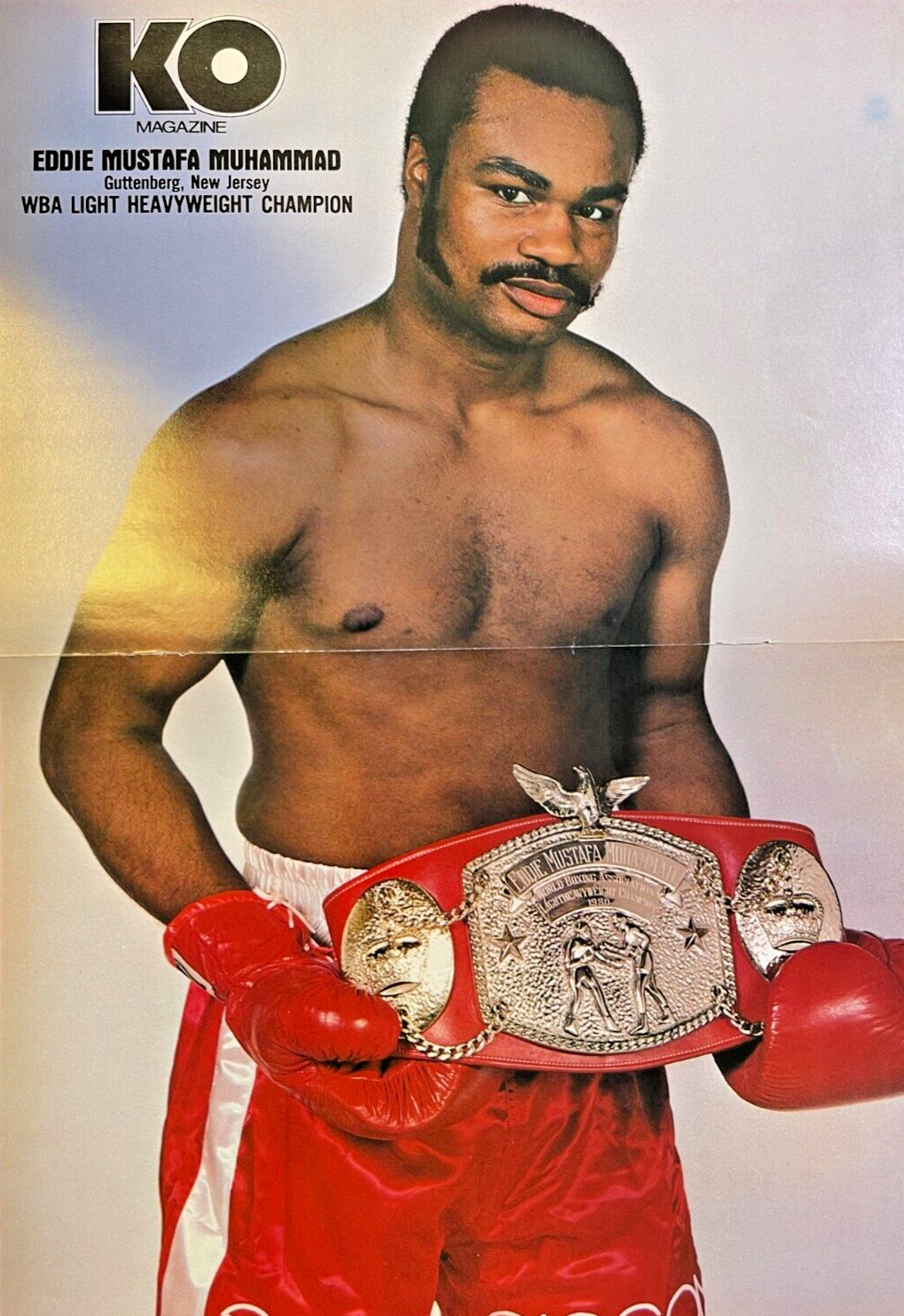
- c. 1981

Personal information
- Nickname: Flame
- Born: Eddie Mustafa Muhammad (born Edward Dean Gregory); April 30, 1952 (age 74) Brooklyn, New York City, New York, U.S.
- Height: 6 ft 0 in (183 cm)
- Weight: Light heavyweight Cruiserweight

Boxing career
- Reach: 73 in (185 cm)
- Stance: Orthodox

Boxing record
- Total fights: 59
- Wins: 50
- Win by KO: 39
- Losses: 8
- Draws: 1

Eddie Mustafa Muhammad (born Edward Dean Gregory; April 30, 1952) is an American former professional boxer who held the WBA (WBA) light heavyweight world title. He has since worked as a boxing trainer, and as an occasional actor.

== Amateur career ==
Boxing under his birth name, Eddie Gregory, Muhammad won two New York Golden Gloves Championships. Gregory won both the 1971 and the 1972 New York Golden Gloves 147 lb Open Championships. Gregory defeated future middleweight champion Vito Antuofermo in the 1971 finals and in 1972 defeated Patrick Maloney of the Leatherpushers Athletic Club to win the Championship. Gregory trained at the Police Athletic Leagues Howard Houses in Brooklyn, New York.

== Professional career ==
Known as "Flame", Muhammad turned pro in 1972 and in 1977 challenged WBA Light Heavyweight Title holder Víctor Galíndez but lost a unanimous decision. He got a second shot at the title against Marvin Johnson in 1980, and won via an 11th-round TKO to take the belt. He defended the belt twice in 1980 and lost a non-title bout against Renaldo Snipes in 1981. Later in 1981 he would lose his title as well in a defense against Michael Spinks via unanimous decision. After losing the belt, Muhammad fought mainly club level fighters before landing another shot at a title in 1985, the vacant IBF Light Heavyweight Title, pitted against Slobodan Kacar. Kacar won a narrow split decision and Muhammad retired after three more bouts.

Muhammad made a brief comeback in 1988, but hung up the gloves for good later that year after losing via TKO to journeyman Arthel Lawhorne.

He also appeared in two motion pictures: the 1980 film Raging Bull, playing the role of Billy Fox; and Leon Isaac Kennedy's 1981 version of Body and Soul, where he portrayed himself.

=== Film appearances ===
- Raging Bull (1980) - Billy Fox - Fox Fight
- Body and Soul (1981) - himself
- Hope for the Broken Contender (2008) - Himself

== Professional boxing record ==
50 Wins (39 knockouts, 11 decisions), 8 Losses (1 knockout, 7 decisions), 1 Draw Archived October 5, 2013, at the Wayback Machine
Result	Record	Opponent	Type	Round	Date	Location	Notes
Loss	50–8–1	(United States) Arthel Lawhorne	TKO	3	21/10/1988	Newark, New Jersey, U.S.	Referee stopped the bout at 1:43 of the third round.
Win	50–7–1	(United States) Melvin Epps	UD	10	24/03/1988	Newark, New Jersey, U.S.	
Win	49–7–1	"Rob" Roy Davidson	TKO	7	04/02/1988	Newark, New Jersey, U.S.	Referee stopped the bout at 0:57 of the seventh round.
Loss	48–7–1	(Socialist Federal Republic of Yugoslavia) Slobodan Kacar	SD	15	21/12/1985	Pesaro, Marche, Italy	IBF World Light Heavyweight Title. 141–144, 143–145, 145–143
Win	48–6–1	(United States) Elvis Parks	KO	1	22/08/1985	Detroit, Michigan, U.S.	
Win	47–6–1	(United States) Ricky Parkey	UD	10	18/06/1985	Atlantic City, New Jersey, U.S.	6–3, 6–3, 7–2
Win	46–6–1	(United States) Rick Myers	TKO	4	03/04/1985	Galveston, Texas, U.S.	
Win	45–6–1	(United States) Oscar Holman	TKO	7	21/03/1985	Detroit, Michigan, U.S.	
Win	44–6–1	(United States) Tyrone Booze	UD	10	08/02/1985	(New York (state)) New York City, U.S.	6–4, 6–4, 9–1
Win	43–6–1	(The Bahamas) Andy "Cap" Russell	KO	1	29/06/1984	Grayon, Cayman Islands	
Win	42–6–1	(United States) Jerry Celestine	UD	10	22/01/1983	Stateline, Nevada, U.S.	97–93, 98–92, 97–95
Win	41–6–1	(Zambia) Lottie Mwale	KO	4	02/10/1982	Las Vegas, Nevada, U.S.	Mwale knocked out at 1:47 of the fourth round.
Win	40–6–1	(United States) Pablo Paul Ramos	UD	10	07/08/1982	Philadelphia, Pennsylvania, U.S.	
Win	39–6–1	(United States) Michael Hardin	TKO	8	11/12/1981	(The Bahamas) Nassau, Bahamas	Referee stopped the bout at 2:35 of the eighth round.
Loss	38–6–1	(United States) Michael Spinks	UD	15	18/07/1981	Las Vegas, Nevada, U.S.	Lost WBA World Light Heavyweight Title
Loss	38–5–1	(United States) Renaldo Snipes	SD	10	17/05/1981	Atlantic City, New Jersey, U.S.	2–7, 1–9, 5–3
Win	38–4–1	(Netherlands) Rudy Koopmans	RTD	3	28/11/1980	Los Angeles, California, U.S.	Retained WBA World Light Heavyweight Title
Win	37–4–1	(United States) Jerry Martin	TKO	10	20/07/1980	McAfee, New Jersey, U.S.	Retained WBA World Light Heavyweight Title
Win	36–4–1	(United States) Marvin Johnson	TKO	11	31/03/1980	Knoxville, Tennessee, U.S.	Won WBA World Light Heavyweight Title
Win	35–4–1	(United States) Kid Samson	KO	4	28/11/1979	(New York (state)) Hauppauge, New York, U.S.	
Win	34–4–1	(United States) Johnny Wilburn	KO	1	31/08/1979	(New York (state)) Shirley, New York, U.S.	
Win	33–4–1	(United States) Fred "Flintstone" Brown	TKO	3	16/07/1979	(New York (state)) New York City, U.S.	
Win	32–4–1	(United States) Dave Lee Royster	KO	5	10/07/1979	Atlantic City, New Jersey, U.S.	Royster knocked out at 2:54 of the fifth round.
Win	31–4–1	(United States) Pat Cuillo	UD	10	26/02/1979	(New York (state)) New York City, U.S.	
Win	30–4–1	(United States) David Conteh	TKO	8	26/01/1979	(New York (state)) New York City, U.S.	Referee stopped the bout at 0:26 of the eighth round.
Loss	29–4–1	(United States) James "Great" Scott	UD	12	12/10/1978	Woodbridge, New Jersey, U.S.	
Win	29–3–1	(United States) James "Mason" Dixon	KO	1	06/09/1978	(New York (state)) White Plains, New York, U.S.	
Win	28–3–1	(United States) Chuck Warfield	KO	1	16/08/1978	Newark, New Jersey, U.S.	Warfield knocked out at 1:18 of the first round.
Win	27–3–1	(United States) Ed "Savage" Turner	KO	4	14/06/1978	(New York (state)) White Plains, New York, U.S.	
Win	26–3–1	(United States) Ray "Fast Eddy" Elson	TKO	2	02/06/1978	Jersey City, New Jersey, U.S.	
Win	25–3–1	(United States) Nat Gates	KO	7	14/04/1978	Fort Lauderdale, Florida, U.S.	
Win	24–3–1	(Mali) Ba Sounkalo	PTS	10	22/03/1978	Bamako, Mali	
Win	23–3–1	(United States) Jesse Burnett	TKO	10	15/02/1978	Las Vegas, Nevada, U.S.	Referee stopped the bout at 1:59 of the tenth round.
Loss	22–3–1	(Argentina) Victor Galindez	UD	15	20/11/1977	Turin, Piedmont, Italy	WBA World Light Heavyweight Title.
Win	22–2–1	(United States) "Fast" Eddie Phillips	TKO	4	16/09/1977	Wilmington, Delaware, U.S.	
Win	21–2–1	(United States) Matthew Saad Muhammad	SD	10	11/03/1977	Philadelphia, Pennsylvania, U.S.	
Win	20–2–1	(United States) Johnny Wilburn	KO	3	18/01/1977	(New York (state)) Sunnyside, Queens, New York, U.S.	
Win	19–2–1	(United States) Frank Davila	KO	2	29/10/1976	(New York (state)) Sunnyside, Queens, New York, U.S.	
Win	18–2–1	(United States) Jimmy "Sugar Demon" Owens	TKO	10	01/10/1976	(New York (state)) Sunnyside, Queens, New York, U.S.	
Win	17–2–1	(United States) Lee Barber	KO	4	14/07/1976	Philadelphia, Pennsylvania, U.S.	Barber knocked out at 1:00 of the fourth round.
Win	16–2–1	(United States) Otis Gordon	KO	4	28/06/1976	(New York (state)) Sunnyside, Queens, New York, U.S.	
Win	15–2–1	(United States) DC Walker	TKO	6	29/04/1976	(New York (state)) Kingston, New York, U.S.	
Win	14–2–1	(United States) Hildo Silva	KO	7	08/03/1976	(New York (state)) New York City, U.S.	Silva knocked out at 1:37 of the seventh round.
Loss	13–2–1	(United States) Bennie Briscoe	UD	10	18/08/1975	Philadelphia, Pennsylvania, U.S.	44–46, 42–49, 44–46
Win	13–1–1	(United States) Lenny Harden	TKO	10	16/06/1975	Philadelphia, Pennsylvania, U.S.	Referee stopped the bout at 1:12 of the tenth round.
Win	12–1–1	(United States) Don Cobbs	KO	6	28/04/1975	Philadelphia, Pennsylvania, U.S.	Cobbs knocked out at 1:58 of the sixth round.
Win	11–1–1	(United States) Steven "Flasher" Smith	KO	4	14/01/1975	Philadelphia, Pennsylvania, U.S.	Smith knocked out at 1:28 of the fourth round.
Win	10–1–1	(United States) Mario Rosa	KO	8	25/11/1974	(New York (state)) New York City, U.S.	Rosa knocked out at 2:58 of the eighth round.
Win	9–1–1	(United States) Eugene "Cyclone" Hart	KO	4	26/08/1974	(New York (state)) New York City, U.S.	Hart knocked out at 0:51 of the fourth round.
Draw	8–1–1	(France) Nessim Max Cohen	PTS	10	10/05/1974	Marseille, Bouches-du-Rhone, France	
Win	8–1	(United States) Willie "Macho" Classen	PTS	8	08/04/1974	(New York (state)) New York City, U.S.	
Loss	7–1	(United States) Radames Cabrera	UD	10	03/12/1973	(New York (state)) New York City, U.S.	
Win	7–0	(United States) Elwood Townsend	KO	1	24/09/1973	Philadelphia, Pennsylvania, U.S.	
Win	6–0	(Dominican Republic) Jose Anglada	PTS	8	09/07/1973	(New York (state)) New York City, U.S.	
Win	5–0	(United States) Willie "The Flail" Wilson	PTS	6	17/05/1973	North Bergen, New Jersey, U.S.	
Win	4–0	(United States) Percy Halsey	KO	1	01/02/1973	North Bergen, New Jersey, U.S.	
Win	3–0	(United States) Pete Pagan	KO	3	29/09/1972	(New York (state)) Sunnyside, Queens, New York, U.S.	
Win	2–0	(United States) Jose Pagan Rivera	KO	1	16/09/1972	Boston, Massachusetts, U.S.	
Win	1–0	(United States) Dave "Sugar" Wyatt	KO	4	15/09/1972	(New York (state)) New York City, U.S.	

Preceded by Marvin Johnson	WBA Light Heavyweight Champion; 31 March 1980–18 July 1981	Succeeded by Michael Spinks
