= Mike Rossman =

American boxer (born 1955)

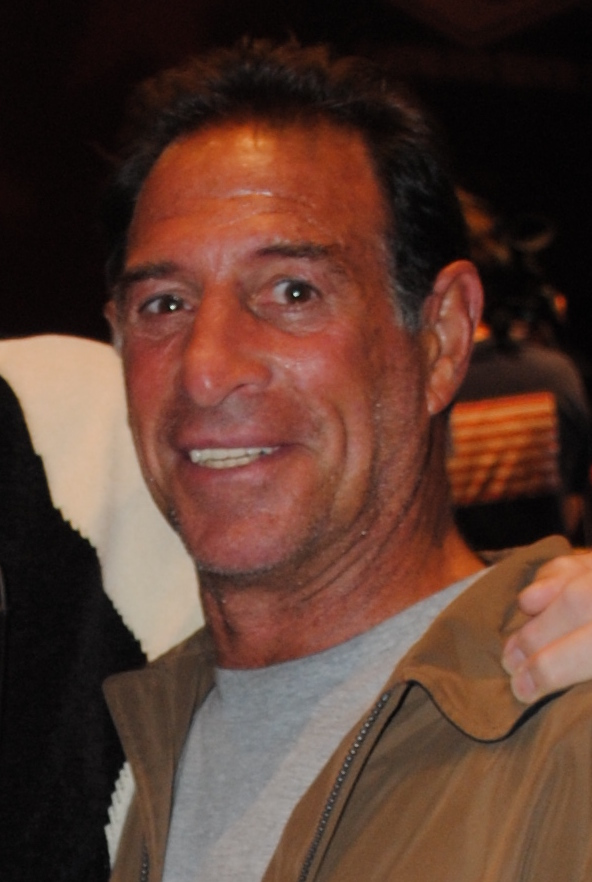
- Rossman in 2012

Personal information
- Nicknames: The Jewish Bomber; The Kosher Butcher
- Nationality: American
- Born: Michael Albert DePiano; July 1, 1955 (age 71) Turnersville, New Jersey, U.S.
- Height: 5 ft 11 in (180 cm)
- Weight: Light heavyweight

Boxing career
- Reach: 73 1/2 in (187 cm)
- Stance: Orthodox

Boxing record
- Total fights: 54
- Wins: 44
- Win by KO: 27
- Losses: 7
- Draws: 3

Mike Rossman (born Michael Albert DePiano on July 1, 1955) is an American former professional boxer who was the WBA light heavyweight champion of the world. He is of both Italian and Jewish descent, which led to his monikers "The Kosher Butcher" and "The Jewish Bomber".

== Life and career ==
Rossman was born in Turnersville, New Jersey, as Michael Albert DePiano. Rossman is his mother's maiden name, which he uses rather than that of his father. Rossman's father was Italian, and his mother Jewish. He is Jewish, and boxed with a Star of David on his shorts. He began boxing at 14 and turned pro on August 10, 1973.

Rossman fought Víctor Galíndez for the light heavyweight championship of the world on the undercard of an Ali–Spinks rematch in September 1978. Many thought Galindez would defeat him, but Rossman opened up cuts over Galindez's eyes and continued fighting until near the end of the 13th round, when the referee stopped the fight, and Rossman became world champion. Rossman made one successful defense before his hometown Philadelphia fans in December of the same year, stopping Italian challenger Aldo Traversaro in the fifth round after opening a wound on Aldo's forehead with a left hook.

Later, after losing the title back to Galindez in 1979 (see below), his career declined as he lost several matches; he never again fought a title match. He fought into the early 1980s, and perhaps the biggest name he faced in post-championship status was the upstart Dwight Braxton (today known as Dwight Muhammad Qawi), who defeated him in seven rounds in May 1981.

=== Rossman vs. Galindez championship rematch ===
In February 1979, Rossman participated in what is sometimes considered one of professional boxing's most embarrassing moments (at least in modern times). At a scheduled rematch between Rossman and Galindez, Rossman was left waiting in the ring as Galindez failed to appear: A dispute about the judges of the match between the WBA and the Nevada Athletic Commission prevented the fight from being for the title, so Galindez camp refused to fight. After immediate attempts to remedy the situation failed, the fight was suspended, and rescheduled two months later in April 1979.

With Rossman perhaps still fretting about boxing politics, Galindez was focused on regaining the title, and was able to defeat Rossman. Rossman apparently broke his right hand during the bout, severely limiting his boxing ability. The pain became worse over the course of the fight, and unbearable to a point where Rossman told his father-manager after the ninth round that he could not continue. Galindez was thus able to reclaim the championship.

== Professional boxing record ==
54 fights	44 wins	7 losses
By knockout	27	5
By decision	17	2
Draws	3	

No.	Result	Record	Opponent	Type	Round, time	Date	Location	Notes
54	Win	44–7–3	Henry Sims	TKO	5 (10)	1983–11–17	Sands Casino Hotel, Atlantic City, New Jersey, U.S.	
53	Win	43–7–3	Robert White	SD	10	1983–08–17	Sands Casino Hotel, Atlantic City, New Jersey, U.S.	
52	Win	42–7–3	Al Fracker	TKO	6 (10)	1983–06–15	Playboy Hotel & Casino, Atlantic City, New Jersey, U.S.	
51	Win	41–7–3	Charles Smith	TKO	10 (10)	1983–04–13	Resorts International Casino, Atlantic City, New Jersey, U.S.	
50	Loss	40–7–3	Dwight Muhammad Qawi	KO	7 (10) 1:59	1981–05–31	Resorts International Casino, Atlantic City, New Jersey, U.S.	
49	Win	40–6–3	Luke Capuano	UD	10	1981–02–22	Conrad Hilton Hotel, Chicago, Illinois, U.S.	
48	Win	39–6–3	Luke Capuano	MD	10	1980–11–13	International Amphitheatre, Chicago, Illinois, U.S.	
47	Win	38–6–3	Al Bolden	KO	10 (10) 2:32	1980–09–09	Resorts International Casino, Atlantic City, New Jersey, U.S.	
46	Win	37–6–3	Don Addison	UD	10	1980–07–12	Resorts International Casino, Atlantic City, New Jersey, U.S.	
45	Loss	36–6–3	Ramon Ranquello	TKO	6 (10)	1979–09–18	Giants Stadium, East Rutherford, New Jersey, U.S.	
44	Loss	36–5–3	Víctor Galíndez	RTD	9 (15) 3:00	1979–04–14	Superdome, New Orleans, Louisiana, U.S.	Lost WBA Light heavyweight title.
43	Win	36–4–3	Aldo Traversaro	TKO	6 (15) 1:15	1978–12–05	The Spectrum, Philadelphia, Pennsylvania, U.S.	Retained WBA Light heavyweight title.
42	Win	35–4–3	Víctor Galíndez	TKO	13 (15)	1978–09–15	Superdome, New Orleans, Louisiana, U.S.	Won WBA Light heavyweight title.
41	Win	34–4–3	Matt Ross	KO	2 (10)	1978–07–15	Convention Hall, Atlantic City, New Jersey, U.S.	
40	Win	33–4–3	Lonnie Bennett	TKO	2 (10) 1:41	1978–05–24	The Spectrum, Philadelphia, Pennsylvania, U.S.	
39	Loss	32–4–3	Yaqui López	RTD	6 (10)	1978–03–02	Felt Forum, New York City, New York, U.S.	
38	Win	32–3–3	Gary Summerhays	UD	10	1977–09–29	Madison Square Garden, New York City, New York, U.S.	
37	Win	31–3–3	Marcel Clay	KO	1 (10) 2:51	1977–07–17	Miami Beach Convention Center, Miami Beach, Florida, U.S.	
36	Win	30–3–3	Mike Quarry	RTD	6 (11)	1977–05–11	Madison Square Garden, New York City, New York, U.S.	
35	Win	29–3–3	Ray Anderson	TKO	4 (10)	1977–03–02	Madison Square Garden, New York City, New York, U.S.	
34	Win	28–3–3	Mike Quarry	MD	10	1976–12–11	The Aladdin, Paradise, Nevada, U.S.	
33	Draw	27–3–3	Christy Elliott	PTS	10	1976–11–10	Walsh Gymnasium, South Orange, New Jersey, U.S.	
32	Win	27–3–2	Christy Elliott	KO	3 (10) 1:59	1976–09–28	Yankee Stadium, New York City, New York, U.S.	
31	Win	26–3–2	Steven Smith	TKO	6 (10)	1976–08–06	Convention Hall, Atlantic City, New Jersey, U.S.	
30	Loss	25–3–2	Tony Licata	MD	10	1976–06–12	Municipal Auditorium, New Orleans, Louisiana, U.S.	
29	Win	25–2–2	José Anglada	KO	9 (10)	1976–05–14	Weehawken HS, Weehawken, New Jersey, U.S.	
28	Win	24–2–2	Gene Wells	UD	10	1976–03–08	Madison Square Garden, New York City, New York, U.S.	
27	Draw	23–2–2	Casey Gacic	PTS	10	1976–02–13	Painters Mill Theatre, Owings Mills, Maryland, U.S.	
26	Win	23–2–1	Al Styles Jr.	UD	10	1975–12–10	Catholic Youth Center, Scranton, Pennsylvania, U.S.	
25	Loss	22–2–1	Mike Quarry	UD	10	1975–09–30	Madison Square Garden, New York City, New York, U.S.	
24	Win	22–1–1	Mike Nixon	KO	7 (10)	1975–08–01	Tropicana Hotel & Casino, Paradise, Nevada, U.S.	
23	Loss	21–1–1	Mike Nixon	SD	10	1975–05–19	Broome County Arena, Binghamton, New York, U.S.	
22	Win	21–0–1	David Adkins	MD	10	1975–04–29	Capital Centre, Landover, Maryland, U.S.	
21	Win	20–0–1	Matt Donovan	UD	10	1975–02–17	The Spectrum, Philadelphia, Pennsylvania, U.S.	
20	Win	19–0–1	Matt Donovan	UD	10	1975–01–21	Capital Centre, Landover, Maryland, U.S.	
19	Win	18–0–1	Harold Richardson	TKO	3 (10)	1974–12–11	Catholic Youth Center, Scranton, Pennsylvania, U.S.	
18	Win	17–0–1	John Pinney	TKO	5 (8) 1:39	1974–11–22	Madison Square Garden, New York City, New York, U.S.	
17	Win	16–0–1	Mike Morgan	UD	8	1974–10–25	Madison Square Garden, New York City, New York, U.S.	
16	Win	15–0–1	Nate Dixon	TKO	4 (8)	1974–09–09	Madison Square Garden, New York City, New York, U.S.	
15	Win	14–0–1	Mike Baker	UD	8	1974–07–29	Madison Square Garden, New York City, New York, U.S.	
14	Draw	13–0–1	Nate Dixon	PTS	8	1974–07–15	The Spectrum, Philadelphia, Pennsylvania, U.S.	
13	Win	13–0	Ray Hernandez	UD	6	1974–06–17	Madison Square Garden, New York City, New York, U.S.	
12	Win	12–0	Walter Riley	TKO	1 (6)	1974–05–29	Catholic Youth Center, Scranton, Pennsylvania, U.S.	
11	Win	11–0	Tyrone Freeman	UD	6	1974–04–29	The Spectrum, Philadelphia, Pennsylvania, U.S.	
10	Win	10–0	Joey Blair	TKO	6 (8)	1974–03–20	Catholic Youth Center, Scranton, Pennsylvania, U.S.	
9	Win	9–0	Greg Burch	PTS	6	1974–02–18	The Spectrum, Philadelphia, Pennsylvania, U.S.	
8	Win	8–0	Maximo Pierret	UD	6	1974–02–09	Catholic Youth Center, Scranton, Pennsylvania, U.S.	
7	Win	7–0	Elwood Townsend	TKO	2 (6)	1973–12–15	Catholic Youth Center, Scranton, Pennsylvania, U.S.	
6	Win	6–0	Lester Camper	TKO	6 (6)	1973–12–08	Convention Hall, Atlantic City, New Jersey, U.S.	
5	Win	5–0	Nate Dixon	TKO	3 (6)	1973–11–14	Catholic Youth Center, Scranton, Pennsylvania, U.S.	
4	Win	4–0	Larry Parker	TKO	1 (4)	1973–10–31	Baltimore Civic Center, Baltimore, Maryland, U.S.	
3	Win	3–0	Herman Nance	KO	1 (4) 2:03	1973–10–22	The Spectrum, Philadelphia, Pennsylvania, U.S.	
2	Win	2–0	Robert Ziegler	TKO	3 (4)	1973–09–24	The Spectrum, Philadelphia, Pennsylvania, U.S.	
1	Win	1–0	Stanley Dawson	KO	2 (4)	1973–08–10	Convention Hall, Atlantic City, New Jersey, U.S.	

== Miscellaneous ==
- Rossman has a tattoo of the Star of David on the calf of his right leg.
- Rossman now lives in Atlantic City, New Jersey.
- Rossman was inducted into the New Jersey Boxing Hall of Fame.

== See also ==
- List of world light-heavyweight boxing champions
- List of Jewish boxers

Sporting positions
World boxing titles
Preceded by Víctor Galíndez	WBA light heavyweight champion September 15, 1978 – April 14, 1979	Succeeded by Víctor Galíndez
