= Jorge Ahumada =

Argentine boxer

Personal information
- Nickname: Aconcagua
- Nationality: (Argentina) Argentine
- Born: Jorge Victor Ahumada; 6 January 1946 (age 80) Godoy Cruz, Mendoza, Argentina
- Weight: Light heavyweight

Boxing career
- Stance: Orthodox

Boxing record
- Total fights: 52
- Wins: 42
- Win by KO: 22
- Losses: 8
- Draws: 2
- No contests: 0
Medal record
Men's boxing
Representing Argentina
Pan American Games
Gold medal – first place	1967 Winnipeg	Middleweight

Jorge Victor Ahumada (born 6 January 1946) is a former professional boxer. Notable fights include five bouts with Víctor Galíndez (one of which was a world title challenge at the Madison Square Garden in New York, New York), a title bout with Bob Foster (Foster's last title defense) which ended in a draw, and a bout with John Conteh for the WBC Light Heavyweight Championship.
