= Juan Aguilar (boxer) =

Argentine boxer

Personal information
- Born: 15 May 1943; Mendoza, Argentina
- Died: 16 January 2015 (aged 71); Mendoza, Argentina
- Height: 1.74 m (5 ft 9 in)
- Weight: 75 kg (165 lb)

Sport
- Sport: Boxing

Juan Aguilar (15 May 1943 – 16 January 2015) was an Argentine boxer. He competed in the 1964 Summer Olympics.
