= Harald Skog =

Norwegian boxer

Personal information
- Full name: Inge Harald Skog
- Nationality: Norwegian
- Born: 22 August 1949 (age 76) Holt Municipality, Norway

Sport
- Sport: Boxing

Inge Harald Skog (born 22 August 1949) is a Norwegian boxer. He competed in the men's light heavyweight event at the 1972 Summer Olympics.
