= George Foreman vs. Joe Frazier II =

Boxing competition

Battle of the Gladiators
- Date: June 15, 1976
- Venue: Nassau Coliseum, Uniondale, New York, U.S.
- Titles on the line: NABF heavyweight title

Tale of the tape
| Boxer | George Foreman | Joe Frazier |
| Nickname | Big | Smokin' |
| Hometown | Houston, Texas, U.S. | Beaufort, South Carolina, U.S. |
| Purse | $1,000,000 | $1,000,000 |
| Pre-fight record | 41–1 (38 KO) | 32–3 (27 KO) |
| Age | 27 years, 5 months | 32 years, 5 months |
| Height | 6 ft 4 in (193 cm) | 5 ft 11 1/2 in (182 cm) |
| Weight | 224 lb (102 kg) | 224 1/2 lb (102 kg) |
| Style | Orthodox | Orthodox |
| Recognition | WBC; No. 1 Ranked Heavyweight; The Ring; No. 4 Ranked Heavyweight; NABF heavyweight champion Former undisputed heavyweight champion | WBC; No. 2 Ranked Heavyweight; The Ring; No. 3 Ranked Heavyweight; Former undisputed heavyweight champion |

Result
- Foreman wins by technical knockout in round 5

George Foreman vs. Joe Frazier II, billed as "Battle of the Gladiators", was a professional boxing match contested on June 15, 1976, for the NABF heavyweight championship.

== Background ==
On March 18, 1976, former undisputed heavyweight champions George Foreman and Joe Frazier agreed to face one another in a rematch of their 1973 heavyweight title bout. In their previous encounter, Foreman had brutalized the then-champion Frazier, scoring six knockdowns in less than two rounds to capture the WBA and WBC heavyweight championships. Foreman had then successfully defended the titles twice, easily defeating José Roman and Ken Norton by knockout in the first and second rounds respectively. Foreman, however, lost his titles to Muhammad Ali in "The Rumble in the Jungle" in October 1974, by KO in the eighth round. The following year, Frazier finally got his first chance to regain the heavyweight titles, challenging Ali in a fight dubbed the "Thrilla in Manila", though he lost by technical knockout in the 14th round.

After his defeat at the hands of Ali, Foreman was out of boxing for over a year, sitting out all of 1975. He returned in January 1976 to defeat Ron Lyle and capture the less-regarded NABF heavyweight title before agreeing to face Frazier. Foreman hoped a victory over Frazier would propel him to a championship rematch with Ali, while Frazier, who was close to retirement, hoped to avenge the blowout loss Foreman had bestowed him with three years prior. Foreman entered the bout as the 8-5 favorite.

== The Fight ==
At the start of the fight, Frazier abandoned his usual aggressive approach and utilized a more defensive style to avoid a repeat of his previous fight with Foreman. Frazier kept his distance throughout the first four rounds and even taunted Foreman by dropping his hands and daring him to land a punch. Foreman, however, took control of the action, getting Frazier against the ropes and weakening him with powerful body shots. In the fifth, Foreman finally broke through and landed a combination with Frazier against the ropes with the final punch being a devastating left hook. Frazier immediately returned with a jab, but slipped and fell down to the canvas. Frazier got back up and continued the fight, but Foreman quickly sent him back down with a powerful right hand. Frazier pulled himself back up at the count of seven, but his trainer Eddie Futch jumped on the ring apron and ordered the referee to stop the fight to prevent further punishment. Foreman was then named the winner by technical knockout at 2:26 of the fifth round.

"George Foreman: Too big! Too strong! In perfect shape! The punches crisp from the very beginning! Frazier: As game as ever. But now, inevitability, the boxing career over." - Howard Cosell, during the live broadcast of the fight.

== Aftermath ==
Following the fight, Frazier went on a five-year hiatus, coming back only once more to do battle and draw with Floyd Cummings.

== Legacy ==
Though often overlooked, Foreman's second fight with Frazier was a considerable point in both their careers. Foreman, who was still looking to solidify his comeback following his loss to Muhammad Ali in the Rumble in the Jungle, was able to convince the public that he was once again a genuine contender for the heavyweight title. Most notably, Foreman's success in doing away with Frazier for the second time began talks of a rematch between him and Ali, though this would ultimately never come to be. On the other hand, the fight signaled to the public that Frazier, after his two consecutive losses to both Ali and Foreman, had no more future in the sport.

== Undercard ==
Confirmed bouts:

== Broadcasting ==
| Country | Broadcaster |
|---|---|
| Australia | Nine Network |
| Brazil | Band |
| Canada | CTV |
| France | TF1 |
| Germany | ARD |
| Japan | TBS |
| Mexico | Televisa |
| Philippines | RPN 9 |
| Spain | TVE |
| United Kingdom | ITV |
| United States | ABC NOT SHOWN LIVE, ONLY AVAILABLE LIVE VIA CLOSED-CIRCUIT |

| Preceded by vs. Ron Lyle | George Foreman's bouts 15 June 1976 | Succeeded by vs. Scott LeDoux |
| Preceded by vs. Muhammad Ali III | Joe Frazier's bouts 15 June 1976 | Succeeded by vs. Floyd Cummings |
