= George Foreman vs. Jimmy Young =

Boxing match

- Date: March 17, 1977
- Venue: Roberto Clemente Coliseum, San Juan, Puerto Rico

Tale of the tape
Boxer	George Foreman	Jimmy Young
Nickname	Big	
Hometown	Houston, Texas, U.S.	Philadelphia, Pennsylvania, U.S.
Purse	$700,000	$250,000
Pre-fight record	45–1 (42 KO)	21–5–2 (7 KO)
Age	28 years, 2 months	28 years, 4 months
Height	6 ft 4 in (193 cm)	6 ft 2 in (188 cm)
Weight	226 lb (103 kg)	213 lb (97 kg)
Style	Orthodox	Orthodox
Recognition	The Ring; No. 1 Ranked Heavyweight; Former Undisputed Champion	The Ring; No. 3 Ranked Heavyweight

Result
- Young wins via unanimous decision (118–111, 116–112, 115–114)

George Foreman vs. Jimmy Young was a professional boxing match contested on March 17, 1977.

== Background ==
A fight between top ranked heavyweight contenders George Foreman and Jimmy Young had been in the works since June 1976, shortly after Foreman had successfully defended the NABF heavyweight title by defeating former undisputed heavyweight champion Joe Frazier in a rematch of their 1973 bout. Foreman, who was the number-one ranked heavyweight at the time, had hoped his victory over Frazier would position himself for a rematch with Muhammad Ali, but Ali already had a title defense against Ken Norton in September and was teasing retirement after the Norton fight, causing Foreman to pursue a fight with Young, who was the number-three ranked heavyweight and earlier in the year had gone the distance with Ali in a failed bid for Ali's undisputed heavyweight title.

The fight was officially announced in February 1977 to be taking place the following month on March 17, 1977, in the Capital Centre in Landover, Maryland where Young had fought Ali the previous year. However, the venue was changed a week later when promoter Don King announced that it would instead take place at Roberto Clemente Coliseum in San Juan, Puerto Rico.

== Fight details ==
Foreman struggled throughout much of the fight with not only the defensive-minded Young's style of fighting, but with the high temperatures of the Puerto Rican climate as he seemingly suffered from heat exhaustion and badly tired towards the end of the fight. Though Foreman was the aggressor, Young used constant movement to keep Foreman off-balance as he struggled to land substantial offense. Foreman was so frustrated that he frequently pushed, nearly broke Young's arm in a clinch and had a point deducted from the scorecards in round three due to what the referee called "unnecessary roughing."

However, Foreman nearly ended the fight in round seven when during the first minute of the round, Foreman landed a left hook that hurt Young badly. The dazed Young stumbled into the ropes and tried desperately to avoid Foreman for the remaining two minutes as Foreman pursued Young throughout, though he was unable to score a knockdown as he tired and Young recovered, landed several sharp jabs and survived the round. Fighting more aggressively thereafter and with Foreman tiring, Young controlled the latter rounds, though he held only a narrow lead on two scorecards going into the 12th and final round.

Young would take the round, becoming the third and final fighter to score a knockdown on Foreman, when Foreman missed with a wild right and Young countered with an overhand right that sent Foreman down on his right knee. Foreman got back up quickly, but still had to take the referee's standing eight-count after which he continued the fight which had one more minute remaining. While Young continued to throw punches in flurries, the exhausted mostly clinched as fight came to an end. Young was ultimately named the winner by unanimous decision, winning all three of the judge's scorecards with scores of 118–111, 116–112 and 115–114. The point Foreman lost in the third round did not factor in the decision, though Young would've won by a majority decision rather than a unanimous one.

== Aftermath ==
The fight was named The Ring magazine's fight of the year for 1977, while the 12th round was named round of the year. It was Foreman's second consecutive fight to win both awards as his fight with Ron Lyle the previous year had also won both awards, and his fourth overall as his 1973 fight with Frazier and 1974 fight with Ali had also been bestowed the award.

Foreman, suffering from heat exhaustion, became ill in his dressing room after the fight and claimed to be near-death before having a religious experience Foreman explained changed his life. Two months later, Foreman announced his retirement from boxing on a Houston radio station citing his new-found religious beliefs and his mother as reasons why he had decided to step away from boxing.

== Fight card ==
Confirmed bouts:

Weight Class	Weight		vs.		Method	Round	Notes
Heavyweight	200+ lbs.	Jimmy Young	def.	George Foreman	UD	12/12
Super Featherweight	130 lbs.	Alfredo Escalera (c)	def.	Ronnie McGarvey	TKO	6/15	^{note 1}
Heavyweight	200+ lbs.	Larry Holmes	def.	Horace Robinson	TKO	5/10
N/A	N/A	Josue Marquez	def.	Rolando Garcia	KO	4/10
Heavyweight	200+ lbs.	Ossie Ocasio	def.	Gene Idelette	KO	1/8

^Note 1 For WBC Super Featherweight Title

== Broadcasting ==
Country	Broadcaster
United States	ABC

Preceded by vs. Pedro Agosto	George Foreman's bouts 17 March 1977	Succeeded by vs. Steve Zouski
Preceded by vs. Ron Lyle	Jimmy Young's bouts 17 March 1977	Succeeded by vs. Jody Ballard
Awards
Preceded by George Foreman vs. Ron Lyle	The Ring Fight of the Year; 1977	Succeeded by Muhammad Ali vs. Leon Spinks
Preceded by George Foreman vs. Ron Lyle; Rounds 4 & 5	The Ring Round of the Year; Round 12; 1977	Succeeded by Muhammad Ali vs. Leon Spinks; Round 15
