= Carlos Padilla Jr. =

Filipino boxing referee (born 1934)

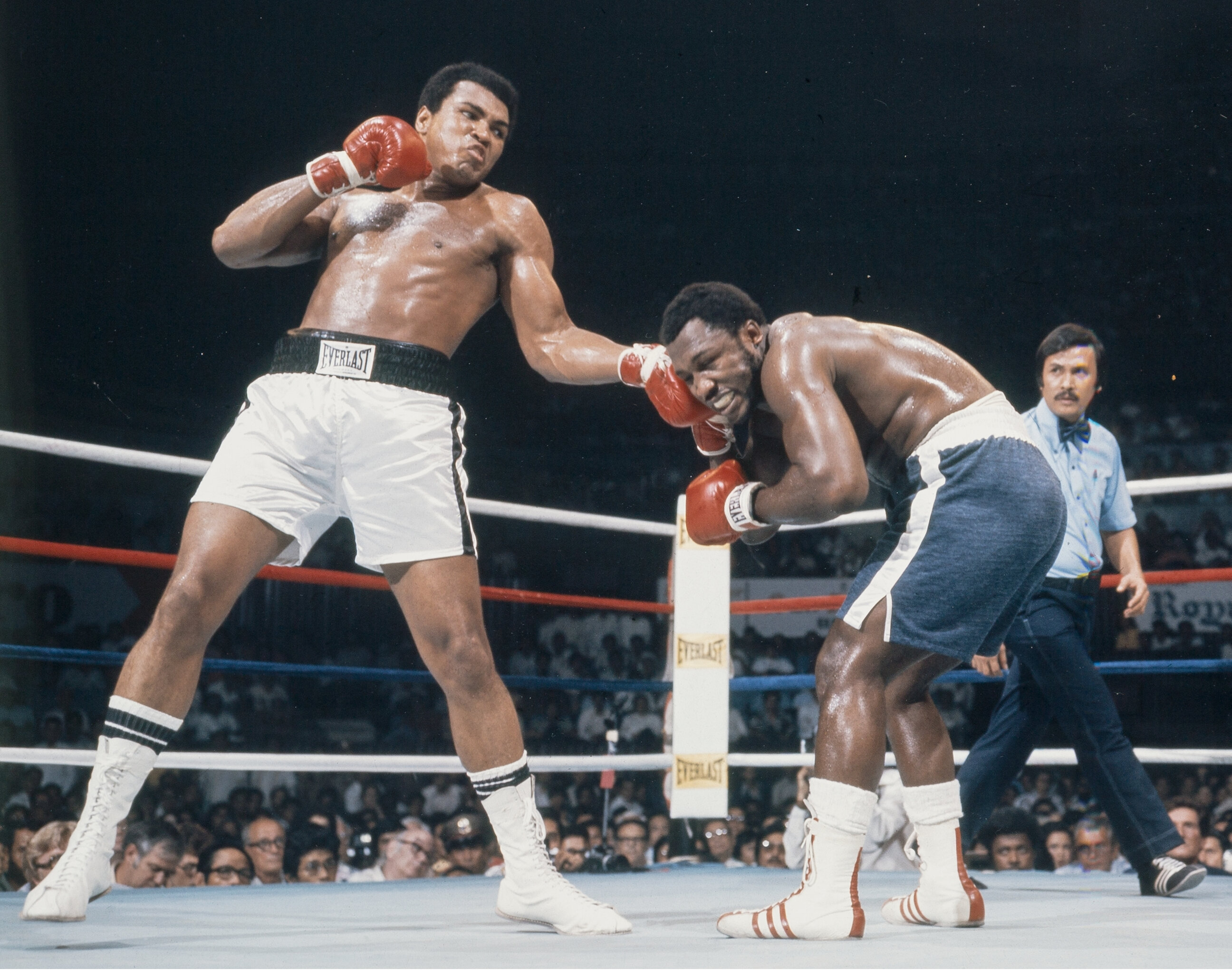
- Padilla (far right, behind Joe Frazier), refereeing the Thrilla in Manila
- Born: Carlos Dolorico Padilla Jr. April 19, 1934 (age 92); Manila, Philippines
- Spouse: Esperanza Perez
- Children: Zsa Zsa Padilla
- Parent: Carlos Padilla Sr. (father)
- Relatives: Padilla family

Carlos "Sonny" Dolorico Padilla Jr. (Tagalog pronunciation: [paˈdilja]; born April 19, 1934) is a retired actor and boxing referee and judge from the Philippines. He is best known for refereeing the "Thrilla in Manila" between Muhammad Ali and Joe Frazier in 1975.

== Career ==
The son of an Olympic boxer and actor, Padilla's professional career began as an actor, where he was known a commercial advertisement of "Family Rubbing Alcohol" with the famous slogan, Hindi lang pampamilya, pang-isports pa. His acting career spanned over 40 years, with his final credited role in Sige, Subukan Mo in 1998.

Padilla first came to international prominence as a referee when he refereed the third fight between Muhammad Ali and Joe Frazier, known as the "Thrilla in Manila". Before the fight, Frazier's trainer Eddie Futch, who was concerned about potential officiating bias and had strongly criticized the performance of referee Tony Perez during Ali and Frazier's second fight, objected to all three American referees who had traveled to the Philippines. Futch suggested that a local official should be used, so Padilla, who was little known outside his home country, was chosen; Padilla only learned of his selection the day before the fight. Despite having 11 years of experience, it was Padilla's first time officiating a fight above the 135-lb. weight class. On his official scorecard for the fight (which Ali won by TKO after 14 rounds), Padilla scored in favor of Ali, 66–60.

Encouraged by Don King (who had previously objected to Padilla's inclusion in the fight), Padilla relocated to the United States afterwards, and went on to officiate many high-profile boxing matches through the next two-plus decades.

He refereed his final bout on October 14, 2000, between Manny Pacquiao and Nedal Hussein in the Philippines, a fight in which he admitted to cheating in order to help Pacquiao win.

=== Notable fights ===
- 1979: Wilfred Benítez vs. Sugar Ray Leonard
- 1987: Mike Tyson vs. Pinklon Thomas
- 1980: Sugar Ray Leonard vs. Roberto Durán
- 1984: Thomas Hearns vs. Roberto Durán
- 1985: Julio César Chávez vs. Ruben Castillo
- 1981: Dwight Muhammad Qawi vs. Matthew Saad Muhammad
- 1981: Salvador Sánchez vs. Wilfredo Gómez
- 2000: Manny Pacquiao vs. Nedal Hussein

== Personal life ==
Padilla is the son of actor and Olympic boxer Carlos Padilla Sr. He is also father to singer and actress Zsa Zsa Padilla and a grandfather to Karylle and Zia.

He was given a lifetime achievement award by the Philippine Sportswriters Association in 2011.

== Filmography ==
Year	Title	Role	Note(s)	Ref(s).
1958	Malvarosa	Alberto		Ref(s).
1959	Blessings of the Land	Arturo		
1961	Apollo Robles			
1962	Mapusok Na Paghihiganti			
1962	El filibusterismo	Isagani		
1962	Albano Brothers			
1962	Kapit sa Patalim			
1962	Leon Marahas			
1963	Tres Cantos			
1963	Sigaw ng Digmaan			
1964	Andres Bonifacio (Ang Supremo)			
1964	Saan Mang Sulok ng Daigdig			
1965	Hamon sa Bandila			
1965	Captain Barbell Kontra Captain Bakal	Dario		
1965	Tatak Barbaro			
1965	Anghel sa Aking Balikat			
1966	Dakilang Balatkayo			
1966	Dodong Tricycle			
1969	Capitan Pepe			
1969	Anim ang Dapat Patayin			
1969	Perlas ng Silangan			
1969	Patria Adorada (Dugo ng Bayani)			
1971	Asedillo			
1974	The Manila Connection			
1975	Hoy Mister... Ako ang Misis Mo!			
1976	Nunal sa Tubig	Dr. Villamaria		
1976	The System			
1976	Minsa'y Isang Gamu-gamo			
1997	Mauna Ka Susunod ako	Sarhento Eric De Guardia	Special participation	
1998	Sige, Subukan Mo	Kanor		
