= The Ring magazine Fight of the Year =

Award for boxing matches

The Ring magazine was established in 1922 and has since named a Fight of the Year.

== Fights of the Year by decade ==
=== 1920s ===
- 1922 – Harry Greb W 15 Gene Tunney
- 1923 – Jack Dempsey KO 2 Luis Ángel Firpo
- 1924 – Gene Tunney KO 15 Georges Carpentier
- 1925 – Harry Greb W 15 Mickey Walker
- 1926 – Gene Tunney W 10 Jack Dempsey I
- 1927 – Gene Tunney W 10 Jack Dempsey II
- 1928 – Tommy Loughran W 15 Leo Lomski
- 1929 – Max Schmeling KO 9 Johnny Risko

=== 1930s ===
- 1930 – Jack Kid Berg W 10 Kid Chocolate I
- 1931 – Max Schmeling KO 15 Young Stribling
- 1932 – Tony Canzoneri W 15 Billy Petrolle II
- 1933 – Max Baer TKO 10 Max Schmeling
- 1934 – Barney Ross W 15 Jimmy McLarnin I
- 1935 – Joe Louis KO 4 Max Baer
- 1936 – Max Schmeling KO 12 Joe Louis I
- 1937 – Joe Louis W 15 Tommy Farr
- 1938 – Henry Armstrong W 15 Lou Ambers I
- 1939 – Joe Louis KO 11 Bob Pastor II

=== 1940s ===
- 1940 – Ceferino Garcia D 10 Henry Armstrong
- 1941 – Joe Louis KO 13 Billy Conn I
- 1942 – Willie Pep W 15 Chalky Wright I
- 1943 – Beau Jack W 15 Bob Montgomery II
- 1944 – Bob Montgomery W 15 Beau Jack III
- 1945 – Rocky Graziano KO 10 Red Cochrane I
- 1946 – Tony Zale KO 6 Rocky Graziano I
- 1947 – Rocky Graziano KO 6 Tony Zale II
- 1948 – Marcel Cerdan KO 12 Tony Zale
- 1949 – Willie Pep W 15 Sandy Saddler II

=== 1950s ===
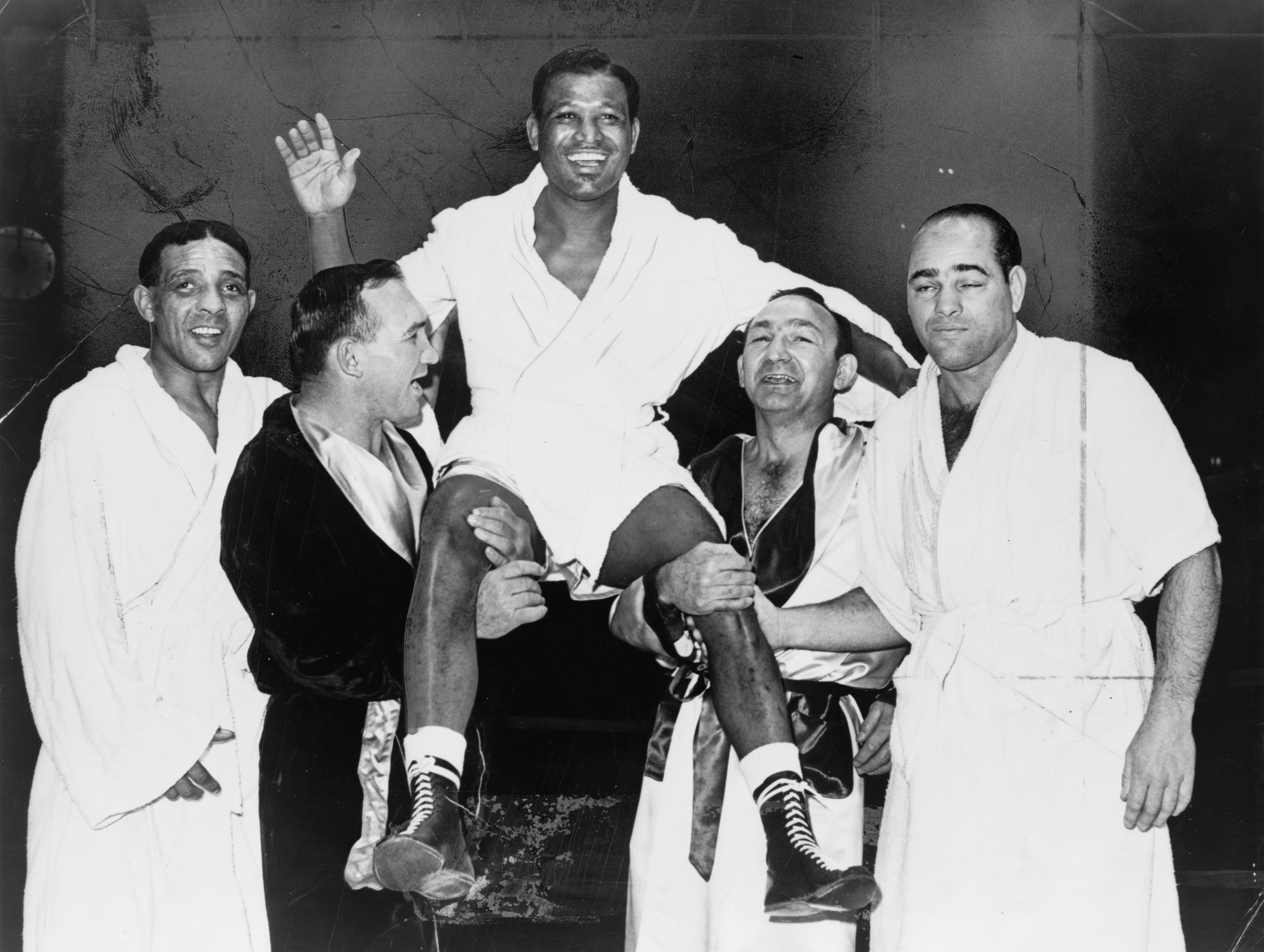
Sugar Ray Robinson being held aloft by Gene Fullmer and Carmen Basilio in 1965. Basilio engaged in five straight Fight of the Year contests from 1955 to 1959, with three of them contested against either Robinson or Fullmer.

- 1950 – Jake LaMotta KO 15 Laurent Dauthuille II
- 1951 – Jersey Joe Walcott KO 7 Ezzard Charles III
- 1952 – Rocky Marciano KO 13 Jersey Joe Walcott I
- 1953 – Rocky Marciano KO 11 Roland La Starza II
- 1954 – Rocky Marciano KO 8 Ezzard Charles II
- 1955 – Carmen Basilio TKO 12 Tony DeMarco II
- 1956 – Carmen Basilio TKO 9 Johnny Saxton II
- 1957 – Carmen Basilio W 15 Sugar Ray Robinson I
- 1958 – Sugar Ray Robinson W 15 Carmen Basilio II
- 1959 – Gene Fullmer KO 14 Carmen Basilio I

=== 1960s ===
- 1960 – Floyd Patterson KO 5 Ingemar Johansson II
- 1961 – Joe Brown W 15 Dave Charnley II
- 1962 – Joey Giardello W 10 Henry Hank II
- 1963 – Cassius Clay (Muhammad Ali) W 10 Doug Jones
- 1964 – Muhammad Ali KO 7 Sonny Liston I
- 1965 – Floyd Patterson W 12 George Chuvalo
- 1966 – José Torres W 15 Eddie Cotton
- 1967 – Nino Benvenuti W 15 Emile Griffith I
- 1968 – Dick Tiger W 10 Frank DePaula
- 1969 – Joe Frazier KO 7 Jerry Quarry I

=== 1970s ===
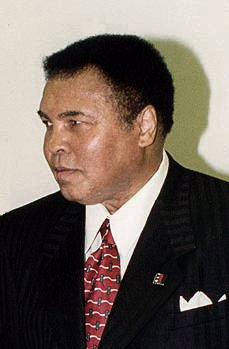
Muhammad Ali was involved in more Fight of the Year contests than any other boxer in history; six spanning almost two decades.

- 1970 – Carlos Monzón KO 12 Nino Benvenuti I
- 1971 – Joe Frazier W 15 Muhammad Ali I
- 1972 – Bob Foster KO 14 Chris Finnegan
- 1973 – George Foreman TKO 2 Joe Frazier I
- 1974 – Muhammad Ali KO 8 George Foreman
- 1975 – Muhammad Ali TKO 14 Joe Frazier III
- 1976 – George Foreman KO 5 Ron Lyle
- 1977 – Jimmy Young W 12 George Foreman
- 1978 – Leon Spinks W 15 Muhammad Ali I
- 1979 – Danny Lopez KO 15 Mike Ayala

=== 1980s ===
- 1980 – Matthew Saad Muhammad KO 14 Yaqui Lopez II
- 1981 – Sugar Ray Leonard TKO 14 Thomas Hearns I
- 1982 – Bobby Chacon UD 15 Rafael Limon IV
- 1983 – Bobby Chacon W 12 Cornelius Boza-Edwards II
- 1984 – José Luis Ramírez KO 4 Edwin Rosario II
- 1985 – Marvelous Marvin Hagler TKO 3 Thomas Hearns
- 1986 – Stevie Cruz W 15 Barry McGuigan
- 1987 – Sugar Ray Leonard W 12 Marvelous Marvin Hagler
- 1988 – Tony Lopez W 12 Rocky Lockridge I
- 1989 – Roberto Durán W 12 Iran Barkley

=== 1990s ===
- 1990 – Julio César Chávez TKO 12 Meldrick Taylor I
- 1991 – Robert Quiroga W 12 Akeem Anifowoshe
- 1992 – Riddick Bowe W 12 Evander Holyfield I
- 1993 – Michael Carbajal KO 7 Humberto González I
- 1994 – Jorge Castro KO 9 John David Jackson I
- 1995 – Saman Sorjaturong TKO 7 Humberto González
- 1996 – Evander Holyfield TKO 11 Mike Tyson I
- 1997 – Arturo Gatti KO 5 Gabriel Ruelas
- 1998 – Ivan Robinson W 10 Arturo Gatti I
- 1999 – Paulie Ayala W 12 Johnny Tapia I

=== 2000s ===
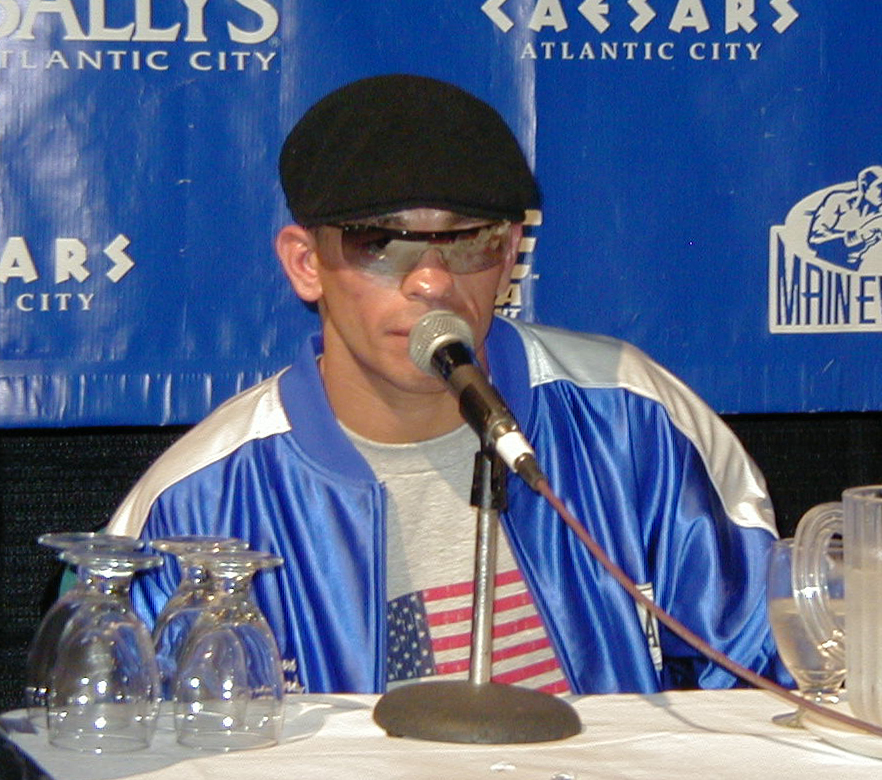
Arturo Gatti at the post-fight press conference after his third fight with Micky Ward, 2003

- 2000 – Erik Morales W 12 Marco Antonio Barrera I
- 2001 – Micky Ward W 10 Emanuel Augustus
- 2002 – Micky Ward W 10 Arturo Gatti I
- 2003 – Arturo Gatti W 10 Micky Ward III
- 2004 – Marco Antonio Barrera W 12 Erik Morales III
- 2005 – Diego Corrales TKO 10 José Luis Castillo
- 2006 – Somsak Sithchatchawal TKO 10 Mahyar Monshipour
- 2007 – Israel Vázquez TKO 6 Rafael Márquez II
- 2008 – Israel Vázquez W 12 Rafael Márquez III
- 2009 – Juan Manuel Márquez TKO 9 Juan Diaz I

=== 2010s ===
- 2010 – Giovani Segura KO 8 Ivan Calderon I
- 2011 – Victor Ortiz W 12 Andre Berto I
- 2012 – Juan Manuel Márquez KO 6 Manny Pacquiao IV
- 2013 – Timothy Bradley W 12 Ruslan Provodnikov
- 2014 – Lucas Matthysse KO 11 John Molina, Jr.
- 2015 – Francisco Vargas TKO 9 Takashi Miura
- 2016 – Francisco Vargas D 12 Orlando Salido
- 2017 – Anthony Joshua TKO 11 Wladimir Klitschko
- 2018 – Canelo Álvarez W 12 Gennady Golovkin II
- 2019 – Naoya Inoue W 12 Nonito Donaire

=== 2020s ===
- 2020 – Jose Zepeda KO 5 Ivan Baranchyk
- 2021 – Tyson Fury KO 11 Deontay Wilder III
- 2022 – Leigh Wood TKO 12 Michael Conlan
- 2023 – Luis Nery KO 11 Azat Hovhannisyan
- 2024 – Raymond Ford TKO 12 Otabek Kholmatov
- 2025 – Chris Eubank Jr W 12 Conor Benn

== See also ==
- Ali–Frazier Award, an equivalent by the Boxing Writers Association of America
