= Muhammad Ali vs. Leon Spinks =

February 1978 boxing competition

- Date: February 15, 1978
- Venue: Hilton Hotel, Winchester, Nevada, U.S.
- Titles on the line: WBA, WBC, and The Ring undisputed heavyweight championship

Tale of the tape
Boxer	Muhammad Ali	Leon Spinks
Nickname	The Greatest	Neon
Hometown	Louisville, Kentucky, U.S.	St. Louis, Missouri, U.S.
Purse	$3,500,000	$320,000
Pre-fight record	55–2 (37 KO)	6–0–1 (5 KO)
Age	36 years	24 years, 7 months
Height	6 ft 3 in (191 cm)	6 ft 1 in (185 cm)
Weight	224 lb (102 kg)	197 lb (89 kg)
Style	Orthodox	Orthodox
Recognition	WBA, WBC and The Ring undisputed Heavyweight Champion	1976 Olympic Light heavyweight Gold Medallist

Result
- Spinks wins via 15-round split decision (142–143, 144–141, 145–140)

Muhammad Ali vs. Leon Spinks was a professional boxing match contested on February 15, 1978, in Las Vegas, Nevada, for the WBA, WBC, and The Ring heavyweight championship.

== Background ==
After his unanimous decision victory against Earnie Shavers, Muhammad Ali decided to face 1976 Olympic Gold medalist Leon Spinks, knowing that he would have to face Ken Norton for the fourth time or lose his WBC belt, after the No. 1 ranked Norton beat No. 2 ranked Jimmy Young in a title eliminator in November 1977.

== The fight ==
Before a sellout crowd of 5,298 that produced a gate of $756,300, The 10–1 underdog Spinks ended up winning two of the scorecards 145–140 and 144–141, while the third was 142–143 giving him a split decision win. Spinks became the Undisputed Heavyweight Champion after only eight professional bouts, and the only man ever to take the world title away from Ali in the ring, as Ali's other losses were either non-title bouts or world title fights where Ali was the challenger.

== Aftermath ==
The bout was named The Ring magazine upset of the year.

The final round (15) was named The Ring magazine round of the year.

Sports Illustrated covered the bout, and with the historic upset put Leon Spinks on the magazine cover. Spinks was later stripped of his WBC heavyweight title on March 18, 1978, for refusing to fight No. 1 contender Norton. Instead, Spinks signed for a rematch with Ali at the Louisiana Superdome in New Orleans. The rematch took place on September 15, 1978, for the World Boxing Association and Lineal Heavyweight Champion titles. Ali regained the title with a unanimous decision over Spinks.

== Broadcasting ==
Country	Broadcaster
Australia	Seven Network
Brazil	Band
Canada	CTV
France	TF1
Germany	ARD
Japan	TBS
Mexico	Televisa
Philippines	RPN 9
Spain	TVE
United Kingdom	BBC
United States	CBS

== Undercard ==
Confirmed bouts:

Winner	Loser	Weight division/title belt(s) disputed	Result
(United States) Danny Lopez	(Ghana) David Kotey	WBC World Featherweight Title	6th-round TKO.
(United States) Eddie Mustafa Muhammad	(United States) Jesse Burnett	Light Heavyweight (10 rounds)	10th-round TKO.
(United States) Tony Chiaverini	(Peru) Marcelo Quiñones	Middleweight (10 rounds)	3rd-round KO.
(United Kingdom) Alan Minter	(Puerto Rico) Sandy Torres	Super Middleweight (10 rounds)	5th-round KO.
(United States) Michael Spinks	(United States) Tom Bethea	Light Heavyweight (8 rounds)	Unanimous decision.

Preceded by vs. Earnie Shavers	Muhammad Ali' bouts February 15, 1978	Succeeded by Rematch
Preceded by vs. Alfio Righetti	Leon Spinks's bouts February 15, 1978	Succeeded by Rematch
Awards
Previous: George Foreman vs. Jimmy Young	The Ring Fight of the Year; 1978	Succeeded by Danny Lopez vs. Mike Ayala
Previous: Jorge Luján vs. Alfonso Zamora	The Ring Upset of the Year; 1978	Next: Vito Antuofermo vs. Marvin Hagler
Previous: George Foreman vs. Jimmy Young; Round 12	The Ring Round of the Year; Round 15; 1978	Next: Marvin Johnson vs. Matthew Franklin; Round 8
