= The Ring magazine Round of the Year =

Combat magazine award

The Ring magazine was established in 1922 and has named a Round of the Year since 1945, which this list covers. The award is based on the magazine's writers' criteria.

== Rounds of the Year by decade ==
=== 1940s ===
- 1945: Willie Joyce vs. Ike Williams, round 12
- 1946: Tony Zale vs. Rocky Graziano, round 6
- 1947: Joe Louis vs. Jersey Joe Walcott, round 4
- 1948: Joe Louis vs. Jersey Joe Walcott II, round 11
- 1949: Rocky Graziano vs. Charley Fusari, round 10

=== 1950s ===
- 1950: Jake LaMotta vs. Laurent Dauthuille II, round 15
- 1951: Joe Louis vs. Rocky Marciano, round 8
- 1952: Jersey Joe Walcott vs. Rocky Marciano, round 13
- 1953: Kid Gavilán vs. Carmen Basilio, round 2
- 1954: Archie Moore vs. Harold Johnson V, round 14
- 1955: Archie Moore vs. Bobo Olson, round 3
- 1956: Sugar Ray Robinson vs. Bobo Olson IV, round 4
- 1957: Sugar Ray Robinson vs. Gene Fullmer II, round 5
- 1958: Ingemar Johansson vs. Eddie Machen, round 1
- 1959: Floyd Patterson vs. Ingemar Johansson, round 3

=== 1960s ===
- 1960: Ingemar Johansson vs. Floyd Patterson II, round 5
- 1961: Floyd Patterson vs. Ingemar Johansson III, round 1
- 1962: Floyd Patterson vs. Sonny Liston, round 1
- 1963: Sonny Liston vs. Floyd Patterson II, round 1
- 1964: José Torres vs. Bobo Olson, round 1
- 1965: José Torres vs. Willie Pastrano, round 6
- 1966: Carlos Ortiz vs. Sugar Ramos, round 5
- 1967: Dick Tiger vs. Roger Rouse, round 12
- 1968: Bob Foster vs. Dick Tiger, round 4
- 1969: Nino Benvenuti vs. Luis Manuel Rodríguez, round 11

=== 1970s ===
- 1970: Muhammad Ali vs. Oscar Bonavena, round 15
- 1971: Joe Frazier vs. Muhammad Ali, round 15
- 1972: Muhammad Ali vs. Bob Foster, round 5
- 1973: Joe Frazier vs. George Foreman, round 2
- 1974: Muhammad Ali vs. George Foreman, round 8
- 1975: Muhammad Ali vs. Joe Frazier III, round 12
- 1976: George Foreman vs. Ron Lyle, rounds 4 and 5
- 1977: George Foreman vs. Jimmy Young, round 12
- 1978: Muhammad Ali vs. Leon Spinks, round 15
- 1979: Matthew Franklin vs. Marvin Johnson, round 8

=== 1980s ===
- 1980: Matthew Saad Muhamad vs. Yaqui López, round 8
- 1981: William "Caveman" Lee vs. John LoCicero, round 5
- 1982: Wilfredo Gómez vs. Lupe Pintor, round 3
- 1983: Larry Holmes vs. Tim Witherspoon, round 9
- 1984: Juan Meza vs. Jaime Garza, round 1
- 1985: Marvin Hagler vs. Thomas Hearns, round 1
- 1986: Steve Cruz vs. Barry McGuigan, round 15
- 1987: Kelvin Seabrooks vs. Thierry Jacob, round 1
- 1988: Mike Tyson vs. Michael Spinks, round 1
- 1989: Lupe Gutierrez vs. Jeff Franklin, round 12

=== 1990s ===
- 1990: Aaron Davis vs. Mark Breland, round 9
- 1991: no award given
- 1992: Evander Holyfield vs. Riddick Bowe, round 10
- 1993: Terry Norris vs. Troy Waters, round 2
- 1994: Jorge Castro vs. John David Jackson, round 9
- 1995: Saman Sorjaturong vs. Humberto González, round 7
- 1996: Frankie Liles vs. Tim Littles, round 3
- 1997: Arturo Gatti vs. Gabriel Ruelas, round 5
- 1998: Ivan Robinson vs. Arturo Gatti II, round 3
- 1999: Oscar De La Hoya vs. Ike Quartey, round 6

=== 2000s ===
- 2000: Erik Morales vs. Marco Antonio Barrera, round 5
- 2001: Bernard Hopkins vs. Félix Trinidad, round 10
- 2002: Micky Ward vs. Arturo Gatti, round 9
- 2003: Acelino Freitas vs. Jorge Rodrigo Barrios, round 11
- 2004: Erik Morales vs. Marco Antonio Barrera III, round 11
- 2005: José Luis Castillo vs. Diego Corrales, round 10
- 2006: Somsak Sithchatchawal vs. Mahyar Monshipour, round 10
- 2007: Rafael Márquez vs. Israel Vázquez II, round 3
- 2008: Israel Vázquez vs. Rafael Márquez III, round 4
- 2009: Marcos Maidana vs. Victor Ortiz, round 1

=== 2010s ===
- 2010: Juan Manuel López vs. Bernabe Concepcion, round 1
- 2011: Alfredo Angulo vs. James Kirkland, round 1
- 2012: Julio César Chávez Jr. vs. Sergio Martínez, round 12
- 2013: Timothy Bradley vs. Ruslan Provodnikov, round 6
- 2014: Tommy Coyle vs. Daniel Brizuela, round 11
- 2015: Amir Imam vs. Fidel Maldonado, round 3
- 2016: Skender Halili vs. Jason Thompson, round 2
- 2017: Dominic Breazeale vs. Izu Ugonoh, round 3
- 2018: Deontay Wilder vs. Tyson Fury, round 12
- 2019: Anthony Joshua vs. Andy Ruiz Jr., round 3

=== 2020s ===
- 2020: Jose Zepeda vs. Ivan Baranchyk, round 5
- 2021: Tyson Fury vs. Deontay Wilder III, round 4
- 2022: Sebastian Fundora vs. Erickson Lubin, round 7
- 2023: O'Shaquie Foster vs. Eduardo Hernandez, round 11
- 2024: Tyson Fury vs. Oleksandr Usyk, round 9
- 2025: Seiya Tsutsumi vs. Daigo Higa, round 9
