= George Foreman vs. Ron Lyle =

1976 professional boxing match

- Date: January 24, 1976
- Venue: Caesars Palace, Paradise, Nevada, U.S.
- Title(s) on the line: NABF heavyweight title

Tale of the tape
Boxer	George Foreman	Ron Lyle
Nickname	Big	
Hometown	Houston, Texas, U.S.	Denver, Colorado, U.S.
Purse	$250,000	$140,000
Pre-fight record	40–1 (37 KO)	31–3–1 (22 KO)
Age	27 years	34 years, 11 months
Height	6 ft 4 in (193 cm)	6 ft 3 in (191 cm)
Weight	226 lb (103 kg)	220 lb (100 kg)
Style	Orthodox	Orthodox
Recognition	The Ring; No. 4 Ranked Heavyweight; Former Undisputed Champion	The Ring; No. 5 Ranked Heavyweight

Result
- Foreman wins via 5th-round knockout

George Foreman vs. Ron Lyle was a professional boxing match contested on January 24, 1976, for the NABF heavyweight title.

== Background ==
After being inactive professionally for over a year after losing the undisputed heavyweight title to Muhammad Ali in The Rumble in the Jungle, George Foreman had announced in October 1975 that his comeback bout would come against heavyweight contender Ron Lyle, though a site and date was not announced at the time. Two months later, it was made official that the fight would occur on January 24, 1976, at Caesars Palace in the Las Vegas Valley.

Lyle had been highly active in 1975, fighting three times. He had lost to fellow contender Jimmy Young in February, and failed to dethrone Ali for the heavyweight title in May, but had rebounded by knocking out heavyweight contender Earnie Shavers in September to set up his fight against Foreman. Despite Lyle's activity and Foreman's 15-month hiatus, Foreman was installed as a 5-1 favorite. In compliance with Nevada State Athletic Commission rules, the fight was judged on a 5-point must system, rather than the more traditional 10-point must system. Foreman prepared for his fight with Lyle by participating in an exhibition bout against fellow Houston native Jody Ballard at the Concord Resort Hotel located in Kiamesha Lake, New York on November 26, 1975. Foreman won the bout via second-round technical knockout.

== The fight ==
The fight was an exciting back-and-forth contest, with both fighters landing heavy blows on one another and each scoring a knockdown.

Lyle took an early lead when he landed a huge right hand flush late in the first round that stunned Foreman, who then repeatedly clinched Lyle in order to survive the round. Foreman rebounded in the second, hurting Lyle towards the end of the round with a left, and then pinning him up against the ropes and then the corner while landing several blows. However, the round was ended after two minutes when timekeeper John Worth erroneously rang the bell. Worth later admitted that he had stopped the round a minute early because he been following the malfunctioning timer used by ABC, which was broadcasting the event, rather than the official time. Foreman had another strong round in the third, once again backing Lyle into a corner for a majority of the round and peppering him with his left jab and combinations to the head and body. In the fourth, Lyle came out aggressively and scored the fight's first knockdown after catching Foreman with a right-left combination. Quickly recovering from the knockdown, Foreman traded blows with Lyle in the center of the ring, eventually knocking down Lyle with a right hand. Lyle was able to get back up at the count of four and continued the round. Foreman pinned a clearly tired Lyle against the ropes and landed several blows to his head, but Lyle fought back into the center of the ring. With two seconds remaining in the fourth round, Lyle sent Foreman down a second time with a left hook. With the round over, but still needing to answer the referee's ten-count, Foreman got back up at the count of six. Early in the fifth round, Lyle staggered Foreman with a left hand, though Foreman was able to stay upright. The two fighters then traded heavy blows before Foreman once again backed Lyle into a corner, landing an unanswered barrage of punches that sent Lyle face-first onto the canvas. Lyle was only able to get to his knees before he was counted out, giving Foreman a knockout victory at 2:28 of the round.

== Aftermath ==
The fight was named The Ring magazine's fight of the year for 1976. Rounds four and five of the bout shared The Ring magazine's award for round of the year. To date, it is the only fight to have two rounds share the award.

== Fight card ==
Confirmed bouts:

Weight Class	Weight		vs.		Method	Round	Notes
Heavyweight	200+ lbs.	George Foreman	def.	Ron Lyle	KO	5/12	^{note 1}
Middleweight	160 lbs.	Ronnie Harris	def.	Tom Hannah	UD	10/10
Heavyweight	200+ lbs.	Marty Monroe	def.	Gregory Johnson	UD	6/6
Heavyweight	200 lbs.	Fred Houpe	def.	Abdul Khan	UD	4/4

^Note 1 For Vacant NABF Heavyweight Title

== Broadcasting ==
Country	Broadcaster
United States	ABC

Preceded by vs. Muhammad Ali	George Foreman's bouts 24 January 1976	Succeeded by vs. Joe Frazier II
Preceded by vs. Earnie Shavers	Ron Lyle's bouts 24 January 1976	Succeeded by vs. Kevin Isaac
Awards
Preceded by Muhammad Ali vs. Joe Frazier III	The Ring Fight of the Year; 1976	Succeeded by George Foreman vs. Jimmy Young
Preceded by Muhammad Ali vs. Joe Frazier III; Round 12	The Ring Round of the Year; Rounds 4 & 5; 1976	Succeeded by George Foreman vs. Jimmy Young; Round 12
