= Muhammad Ali vs. Bob Foster =

Boxing competition

The Sound and the Fury
- Date: November 21, 1972
- Venue: Sahara Tahoe, Stateline, Nevada
- Title(s) on the line: NABF heavyweight title

Tale of the tape
Boxer	(United States) Muhammad Ali	(United States) Bob Foster
Nickname	"The Greatest"	"The Deputy Sheriff"
Hometown	Louisville, Kentucky	Borger, Texas
Purse	$250,000	$125,000
Pre-fight record	39–1 (30 KO)	49–5 (42 KO)
Age	30 years, 10 months	33 years, 11 months
Height	6 ft 3 in (191 cm)	6 ft 3 in (191 cm)
Weight	221 lb (100 kg)	180 lb (82 kg)
Style	Orthodox	Orthodox
Recognition	NABF heavyweight champion Former undisputed heavyweight champion	WBA, WBC and The Ring undisputed Light Heavyweight Champion

Result
- Ali won via 8th round KO

Muhammad Ali vs. Bob Foster, billed as The Sound and the Fury, was a professional boxing match contested on November 21, 1972, for the NABF heavyweight championship.

Ali knocked Foster down seven times and this was the only fight in which Ali ever suffered a cut. The bout was notable because it was one of the first boxing matches refereed by Mills Lane.

== Background ==
Ali came in to the fight at one of the heaviest weights of his career, at 221 pounds to the light-heavyweight Foster's 180 pounds.

== The fight ==
Despite the two men having the same height and reach, (6'3 and 78" respectively) the large weight disparity proved decisive. In the first four rounds Ali was content to move and jab in line with his usual style; however, in a very rare situation for Ali, he was actually out-landed in jabs by Foster (60–35 for the first five rounds, 69–48 for the whole fight). Foster's jabs resulted in the left side of Ali's face noticeably swelling by round four, and a cut being opened around his left eye early in round five. Ali became much more aggressive after the cut, rushing Foster and throwing more power punches in the fifth round than in the previous four combined; Foster landed some of his own but they had little effect on his much larger opponent. Foster was knocked down four times in the fifth round and ended the round with a cut and swelling on his face. Ali became less aggressive in the sixth round and most of the seventh, with both fighters throwing few power punches and landing additional jabs that worsened each other's cuts. In the last minute of the seventh round (in which Foster outlanded Ali 14–5 in jabs) Ali again went on the offensive and pressed his size advantage, knocking Foster down a fifth time with a straight right. Foster got up and landed a few straight rights in return but, as earlier, was unable to do any damage; Ali mocked his opponent by faking being staggered before knocking him down a sixth time with a left hook shortly before the end of the round. Foster came out for the eighth round but was quickly knocked down by a straight right from Ali. Foster rose but failed to beat the referee's count, ending the fight in an eighth-round KO for Ali.

== Aftermath ==
Foster would return to the light heavyweight division while Ali would next face brit Joe Bugner.

== Undercard ==
Confirmed bouts:

Preceded by vs. Floyd Patterson II	Muhammad Ali's bouts 21 November 1972	Succeeded by vs. Joe Bugner
Preceded by vs. Chris Finnegan	Bob Foster's bouts 21 November 1972	Succeeded by vs. Pierre Fourie
Awards
Preceded by Joe Frazier vs. Muhammad Ali; Round 15	The Ring Round of the Year; Round 5; 1972	Succeeded by Joe Frazier vs. George Foreman; Round 2
