= Thrilla in Manila =

1975 boxing match at the Araneta Coliseum

Coordinates: 14.6205°N 121.0533°E

- Poster advertising the match, featuring artwork by LeRoy Neiman.
- Date: October 1, 1975
- Venue: Araneta Coliseum, Cubao, Quezon City, Philippines
- Title(s) on the line: WBA, WBC and The Ring undisputed heavyweight titles

Tale of the tape
Boxer	Muhammad Ali	Joe Frazier
Nickname	The Greatest	Smokin'
Hometown	Louisville, Kentucky, US	Beaufort, South Carolina, US
Purse	$9,000,000	$5,000,000
Pre-fight record	48–2 (34 KO)	32–2 (27 KO)
Age	33 years, 8 months	31 years, 8 months
Height	6 ft 3 in (191 cm)	5 ft 11 1/2 in (182 cm)
Weight	224 1/2 lb (102 kg)	215 1/2 lb (98 kg)
Style	Orthodox	Orthodox
Recognition	WBA, WBC and The Ring undisputed Heavyweight Champion	Former undisputed heavyweight champion

Result
- Ali wins by corner retirement in round 14

Muhammad Ali vs. Joe Frazier III, billed as the Thrilla in Manila, was the third and final boxing match between undisputed champion Muhammad Ali, and former champion Joe Frazier, for the undisputed heavyweight championship of the world. The bout was conceded after fourteen rounds on October 1, 1975, at the Araneta Coliseum in Cubao, Quezon City, Philippines, located in Rizal at the time of the event (later Metro Manila shortly after the event).

The venue was temporarily renamed the "Philippine Coliseum" for this match. Ali won by corner retirement (RTD) after Frazier's chief second, Eddie Futch, asked the referee to stop the fight after the 14th round. The fight was the culmination of a three-bout rivalry between the two fighters that Ali won, 2–1. The contest's name is derived from Ali's rhyming boast that the fight would be "a killa and a thrilla and a chilla, when I get that gorilla in Manila."

The bout is almost universally regarded as one of the best and most brutal fights in boxing history.

== Background ==
The first fight between Frazier and Ali–– promoted as the "Fight of the Century"–– took place on March 8, 1971, in New York's Madison Square Garden. Frazier was the undefeated champion and won by unanimous decision over the previously undefeated former champion Ali, who had been stripped of his titles for refusing to enter the draft for the Vietnam War.

Their showdown was a fast-paced, 15-round bout, with Frazier scoring the fight's only knockdown, at the beginning of the final round. When the rivals met in a January 1974 rematch, neither was champion; Frazier had suffered a stunning second-round knockout by George Foreman a year earlier, and Ali had two controversial split bouts with Ken Norton. In a promotional appearance before the second fight, the two had scuffled in an ABC studio during an interview segment with Howard Cosell.

There were controversial aspects to the fight. In the second round, Ali struck Frazier with a hard right hand, which backed him up. Referee Tony Perez stepped between the fighters, signifying the end of the round, even though there were about 25 seconds left. In so doing, he gave Frazier time to regain his bearings and continue fighting. Perez also failed to contain Ali's tactic of illegally holding and pulling down his opponent's neck in the clinches, which helped Ali to smother Frazier, and gain the 12-round decision. This became a major issue in selecting the referee for the Manila bout.

== Pre-fight promotions and training ==
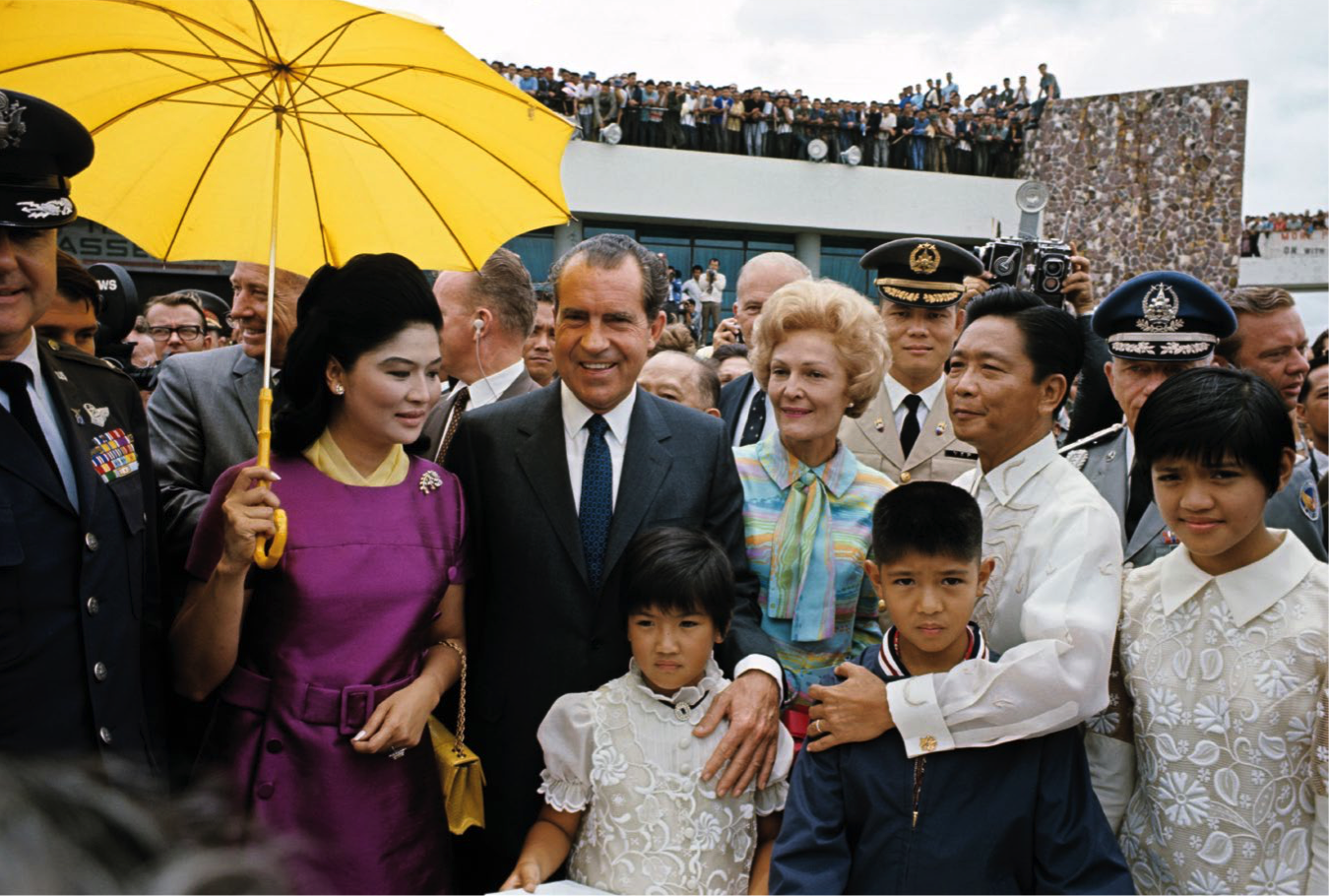
President Ferdinand Marcos (pictured with US president Richard Nixon in July 1969) sought to use the match to improve the reputation of the Philippines.

The president of the Philippines Ferdinand Marcos sought to hold the bout and sponsor it in order to bring attention to the Philippines from around the world.

In the lead-up to the Manila fight, as well as each of their other two encounters, Ali verbally abused Frazier. Ali nicknamed Frazier "The Gorilla", and used this as the basis for the rhyme, "It will be a killa and a thrilla and a chilla when I get the Gorilla in Manila," which he chanted while punching a gorilla doll. Ali told reporter Dick Schaap that it was part of a longstanding pre-fight strategy of his: "I like to get a man mad, because when a man's mad, he wants ya so bad, he can't think, so I like to get a man mad." This strategy had appeared to work in Ali's favor in his defeat of George Foreman. Frazier had skill, confidence, stamina and the character to persevere in difficult circumstances. Dave Wolf (who was a member of the Frazier team in Manila) said: "With all of the residue of anger that Joe had from what had happened before the first fight, what had happened before and during the second fight and after these fights, Joe was ready to lay his life on the line, and ... he did."

Ali's preparations were upset before the fight when he introduced his mistress, Veronica Porché, as his wife to Ferdinand and Imelda Marcos. This angered his wife, Khalilah Ali, who saw the introduction on television back in the States, and subsequently flew to Manila, where she engaged her husband in a prolonged shouting match in his hotel suite.

In the Frazier camp, trainer Eddie Futch made the decision that the throngs of people and the tension in the steaming hot city were a poor environment to train in. Thus, Frazier completed his training for what was to be his final shot at the championship in a lush, quiet setting in the mountainous outskirts of the city of Manila. There, he led a spartan existence, often sitting for hours in a contemplative state in preparation for the bout.

== Fight strategy and referee selection ==
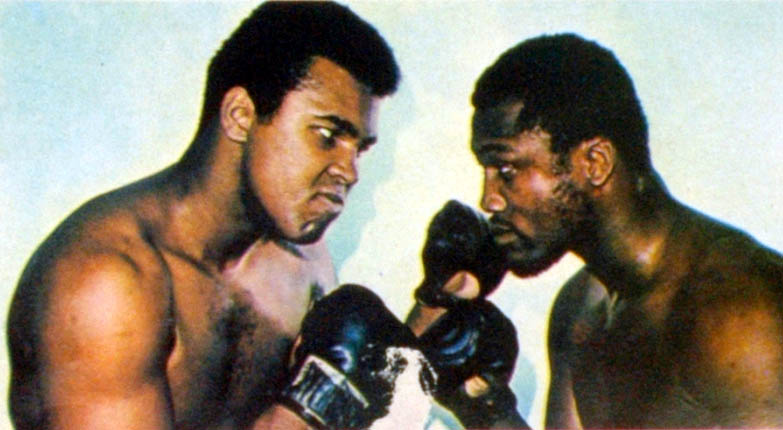
Ali and Frazier in a promotional shot for their prior fight, Super Fight II in New York City

Frazier cornerman Eddie Futch was concerned about preventing Ali from repeating the illegal tactic of holding Frazier behind the neck to create extended clinches. Ali used this tactic to keep Frazier from getting inside and enable himself to get needed rest during his victory in their second meeting. Futch claimed that Ali had done this 133 times in that fight without being penalized. He also had done so in their first meeting, and did it while facing the taller Foreman in his win over him in Zaire, leaving little doubt as to his intentions for the upcoming bout in Manila. Sensing trouble, Futch moved to block (Ali-Foreman ref) Zach Clayton as referee by enlisting the aid of Philadelphia mayor Frank Rizzo. The mayor refused to let Clayton out of his duties as a Philadelphia civil service employee to go referee the fight. Futch also warned Filipino authorities that Ali was going to mar what was to be a great event for their nation by constantly tying up Frazier illegally. He advised them to assign one of their countrymen to referee the bout, stating that this would reflect well on the Philippines, and be a source of pride for its people. Futch and Filipino officials (who bought in heavily to the idea) brushed aside complaints from Don King that a Filipino referee would be too small to handle a heavyweight fight. This resulted in the appointment of Filipino Carlos Padilla, Jr.

Futch and his assistant, George Benton, believed that the key to winning the fight would be for Frazier to persistently attack Ali's body, including when Ali attempted to cover up his torso along the ropes. Benton said, "My expression to Joe was what you've got to do is stay on top of him, and hit the son of a bitch anywhere, hit him on the hips, hit him on the legs. You hit him anywhere!"

Frazier's strategy followed the boxing axiom "if you kill the body, the head will die." As he described it, "Once I've stopped your organs—when those kidneys and liver stop functioning, he can't move so fast ... The organs in his body have to be functioning. If you slow them down, he cannot do what he wants to do."

The Ali camp used the championship as leverage in negotiations and won out on two key points. The ring size of 21 feet (6.4 m) square allowed him the ability to move and circle the ring if he so chose, which would enable him to use his superior boxing skills to his advantage. He also got his preference for 8-ounce (230 g) gloves, which were smaller and less padded than those used in most heavyweight bouts. According to Ali's ring doctor, Ferdie Pacheco, Ali planned to take advantage of Frazier's reputation as a slow starter, and use his superior reach and hand speed to attack Frazier exclusively with punches to the head in the early rounds in the hopes of scoring a knockout, or at least doing enough damage to Frazier to prevent him from fighting effectively as the bout wore on.

== Fight details ==
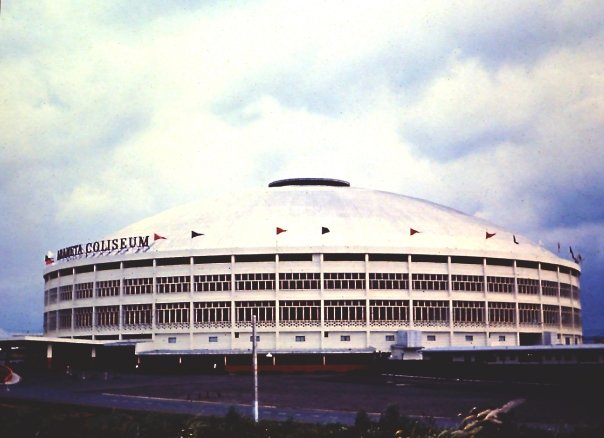
Araneta Coliseum

In order to accommodate an international viewing audience, the fight took place at 10:00 a.m. local time (0200 UTC). Though it served the business interests of the fight, it was detrimental to the fighters. Ali's ring physician, Ferdie Pacheco, said "At 10:00 a.m. the stickiness of the night was still there, but cooked by the sun. So what you got is boiling water for atmosphere." Denise Menz, who was part of Frazier's contingent, said of the conditions inside the aluminum-roofed Philippine Coliseum: "It was so intensely hot, I've never before felt heat like that in my life. Not a breath of air—nothing. And that was sitting there. Can you imagine being in the ring? I don't know how they did it." Frazier estimated the ring temperature at more than 120 °F (49 °C), including heat from TV lights. Ali said that he lost 5 pounds (2.3 kg) during the fight due to dehydration.

When the fighters and their cornermen met at the center of the ring for the referee's instructions, Ali continued his verbal assault on Joe Frazier, finishing with the taunt: "You don't have it, Joe, you don't have it! I'm going to put you away!" In response, Frazier smiled and said "We'll see."

Ali was sharp early, as the slow-starting Frazier could not bob and weave his way inside of Ali's jab. Ali won the first two rounds. He kept Frazier in the center of the ring, and landed several straight right hands immediately after his left jab. Frazier was wobbled by solid punches twice in the early rounds. Commenting for the U.S. television audience, Don Dunphy said, "Ali with his fast hands and sharp shooting keeps it his way." Viewing the fight for the first time some 31 years later, Frazier said, "Too far away, needed to get closer."

Ali also continued to attack his opponent verbally, most noticeably in the 3rd round when he was performing well and had plenty of energy. Referee Carlos Padilla said, "During the fight [Ali] would say 'Ah one ah two and a three ... Jack be nimble and Jack be quick, Jack jump over the candlestick. Is that all you can give? Come on, you ugly gorilla—hit me!'" Several times, Ali made circular hand gestures at Frazier to encourage him closer.

During round 3, Ali began using the "rope-a-dope", a strategy in which he used the ropes for support and rest while allowing his opponent to expend energy throwing punches. When it was effective, Ali would eventually spin off the ropes and unleash a volley of punches in rapid succession against an arm-weary opponent. In Manila, it did not always work out that way. Frazier landed his first good body punches of the fight in the 3rd round with Ali pinned in the corner. Due to his general lack of reach and arthritic right elbow, Frazier needed to be close to Ali to hit him with frequency, and the rope-a-dope enabled him to do that. About two minutes into the round, Ali threw a succession of hard punches, many of which missed. Commenting for the BBC, Harry Carpenter said, "I don't know when I've seen Ali in as aggressive a mood as this. He really looks as if he wants to nail Frazier to the canvas for once and all."

During the fifth round, Frazier's timing and the rhythm of his bobbing and weaving improved. He was able to avoid the oncoming fists of the champion and, for the first time in the fight, land solid left hooks to Ali's head. Ali spent much of the round along the ropes. According to his trainer, Angelo Dundee, this "was the worst thing he could do because he's making Joe pick up momentum where he could drive those shots to the body." Ali's method of self-defense also worsened noticeably in the fifth. Boxing journalist Jerry Izenberg, who was ringside, said, "Somewhere about the 4th or 5th round Joe hit him with a right hand. I didn't think Joe could tie his shoes with his right hand and Ali pulls back and says, 'You don't have no right hand, you can't do that.' and bing! he hits him with another right hand. Suddenly Ali had to think 'Well there are two hands in this fight on the other side'. That was very important." His guard also visibly lowered in this round as a result of the vicious body attack he was absorbing. The net effect was that Ali became much more exposed to Frazier's most lethal punch — his left hook.

Shortly after the bell rang to start the 6th round Frazier landed a thunderous left hook which thudded against the right side of Ali's face. Ali was knocked back by the force of the blow, and landed in the ropes behind him. He did not appear dazed or groggy, but was visibly stiff in his body movements while backing away from the oncoming Frazier, and continuing to throw punches of his own. Seconds later, Frazier landed a tremendous, whipping left hook to Ali's head. Again Ali landed in the ropes behind him, but he only gave the appearance of being slightly dazed and stiff-legged. Ali remained standing and was able to finish the round without being knocked down. Years later, watching the event on video, Frazier shook his head at the sight of Ali withstanding the powerful blows. Jerry Izenberg observed, "They were tremendous hooks, and you have to understand, normal fighters would not have continued. It would have been over." According to Ed Schuyler of Associated Press, who was present at ringside, Ali reacted to Frazier's sixth-round barrage by saying (at the start of the next round), "They told me Joe Frazier was washed up," to which Frazier retorted: "They lied."

As the bout wore on it became clear that despite his belief in the utility of the rope-a-dope, when Ali had his back against the ropes, Frazier had the advantage. Smokin' Joe was able to wear down his opponent with body punches, left hooks to the head, and occasionally, short, chopping right hands. Meanwhile, the long-armed champion had a difficult time getting much power into his punches while fighting on the inside. Dundee, who detested the rope-a-dope (never more so than in Manila) constantly beseeched his fighter to "get off the goddamn ropes!" Beginning at the start of round 7, Ali managed to do so effectively for about a round and a half, and was able to best Frazier in exhausting toe-to-toe exchanges during the opening minute of round 8—described on the telecast as "a big rally by Ali." Later in that round, an arm-weary Ali began to be beaten to the punch by the challenger. During the final minute of round 8, Ali sagged against the ropes in a neutral corner as Frazier landed a series of punches to his body and head. On the broadcast, Dunphy excitedly told his audience near the end of the round: "Frazier may have evened up the round!"

At the close of a very trying ninth round, a visibly tired Ali went back to his corner, and told his trainer: "Man, this is the closest I've ever been to dying." In the opposite corner, Frazier was suffering from pronounced swelling about the face—the result of an accumulation of scores of punches exclusively aimed at his head, increasingly hampering his vision. After an 11th round, in which Ali landed frequently, Eddie Futch confronted his charge, asking him: "What's with this right-hand business?" In response, Frazier indicated that he could not see some of the punches he was being hit with. At this point, Futch gave him what turned out to be poor advice—he told his fighter to stand more upright when approaching Ali rather than continuing his usual bobbing and weaving style. Ali seized upon this immediately in Round 12. With his back to the ropes, he threw many punches with both hands that landed accurately and did still more damage to Frazier's limited eyesight. Adding to Frazier's problems was his corner's inability to maintain a functional icebag to apply to his eye past the middle rounds because of the oppressive heat inside the Philippine Coliseum. As Frazier rose from his stool to contest Round 13 he was a combatant who could barely see.

British sportswriter Frank McGhee ringside for the Daily Mirror describes the final rounds:

The main turning point of the fight came very late. It came midway through the thirteenth round when one of two tremendous right-hand smashes sent the gum shield sailing out of Frazier's mouth. The sight of this man actually moving backwards seemed to inspire Ali. I swear he hit Frazier with thirty tremendous punches—each one as hard as those which knocked out George Foreman in Zaire—during the fourteenth round. He was dredging up all his own last reserves of power to make sure there wouldn't have to be a fifteenth round.

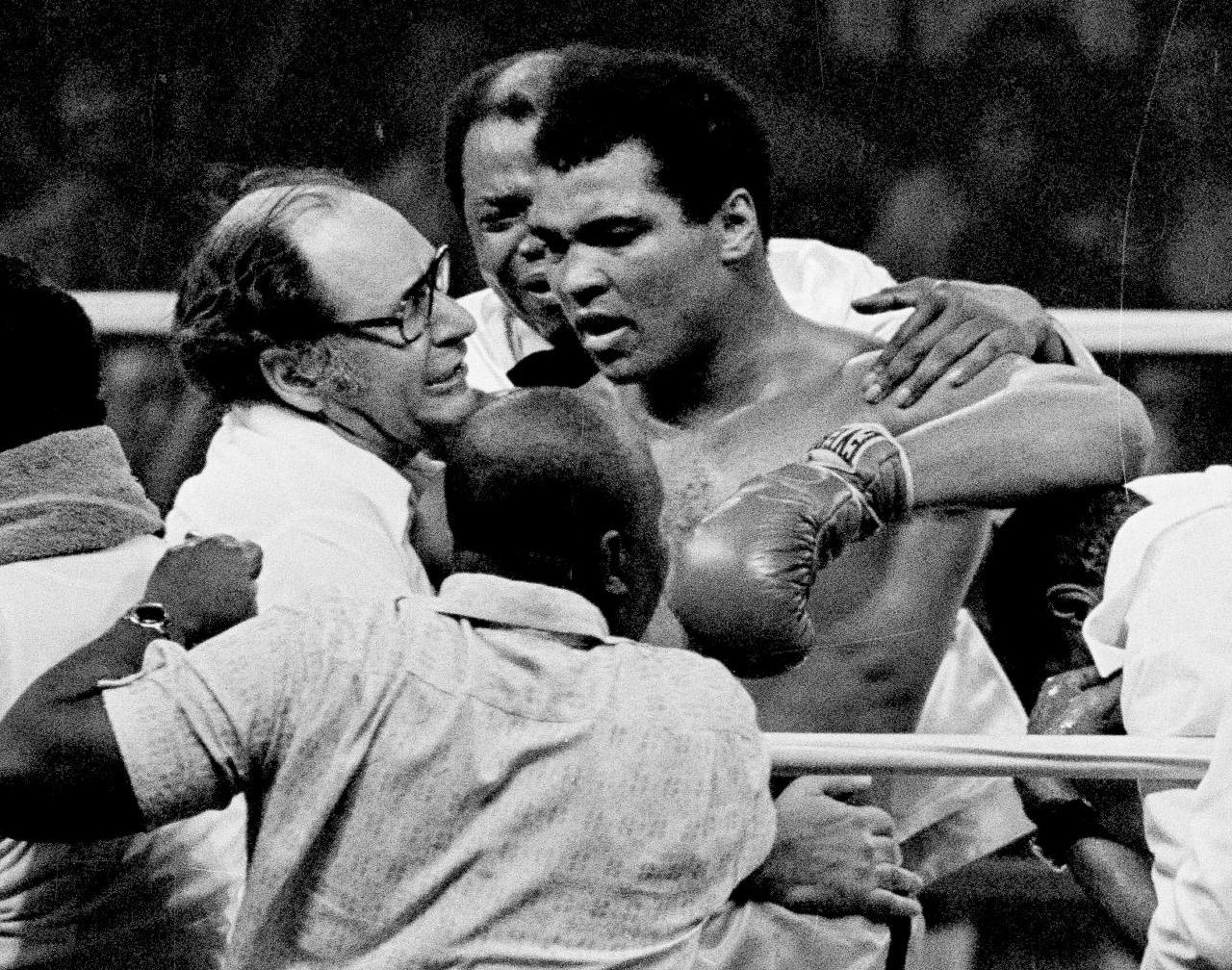
Ali after the fight

Seeing the results of round 14, Eddie Futch decided to stop the fight between rounds rather than risk a similar or worse fate for Frazier in the 15th. Frazier protested stopping the fight, shouting "I want him, boss," and trying to get Futch to change his mind. Futch replied, "It's all over. No one will forget what you did here today", and signaled to referee Carlos Padilla, Jr., to end the bout. Ali would later claim that this was the closest to dying he had ever been. Unbeknownst to Frazier's corner, at the end of the 14th round Ali instructed his cornermen to cut his gloves off, but Dundee ignored him. Ali later told his biographer Thomas Hauser, "Frazier quit just before I did. I didn't think I could fight anymore."

When the fight ended, Ali was ahead on the scorecards of all three officials. Using the 5-point must scoring system, referee Carlos Padilla Jr. had the champion ahead, 66–60, Judge Alfredo Quiazon had it 67–62 and Judge Larry Nadayag had it 66–62.

== Undercard ==
Confirmed bouts:

Winner	Loser	Weight division/title belt(s) disputed	Result
Fernando Cabanela	Rolando Navarrete	GAB bantamweight title	Unanimous decision
Larry Holmes	Rodney Bobick	Heavyweight (10 rounds)	6th-round TKO
Ben Aldeguer	Al Gutierrez	Bantamweight (10 rounds)	Unanimous decision

== Broadcasting ==
The Ali Mall near the Araneta Coliseum was dedicated to Muhammad Ali.

The fight was televised worldwide; it is estimated that it was seen by one billion viewers globally, including 100 million viewers watching the fight on closed-circuit feeds at venues, and 500,000 pay-per-view buys on HBO in the United States.

A notable legacy of the "Thrilla in Manila" was its pioneering use of communication technology: on the night of the fight, HBO became the first television network in history to deliver a continuous signal via satellite. This event linking satellites with cable turned cable television from a re-transmitter to a program provider. Kay Koplovitz, the woman who oversaw cable and satellite broadcasting of the match for HBO, went on to create the Madison Square Garden Sports Network, which later became the USA Network, in 1977.

== Legacy ==
The "Thrilla in Manila" has been considered to be the greatest and most brutal boxing match of all time. The Ring named the bout its Fight of the Year for 1975, while Round 12 also received the award for Round of the Year. In 1999, ESPN.com users voted the "Thrilla in Manila" as one of the top 10 sporting events of the 20th century.

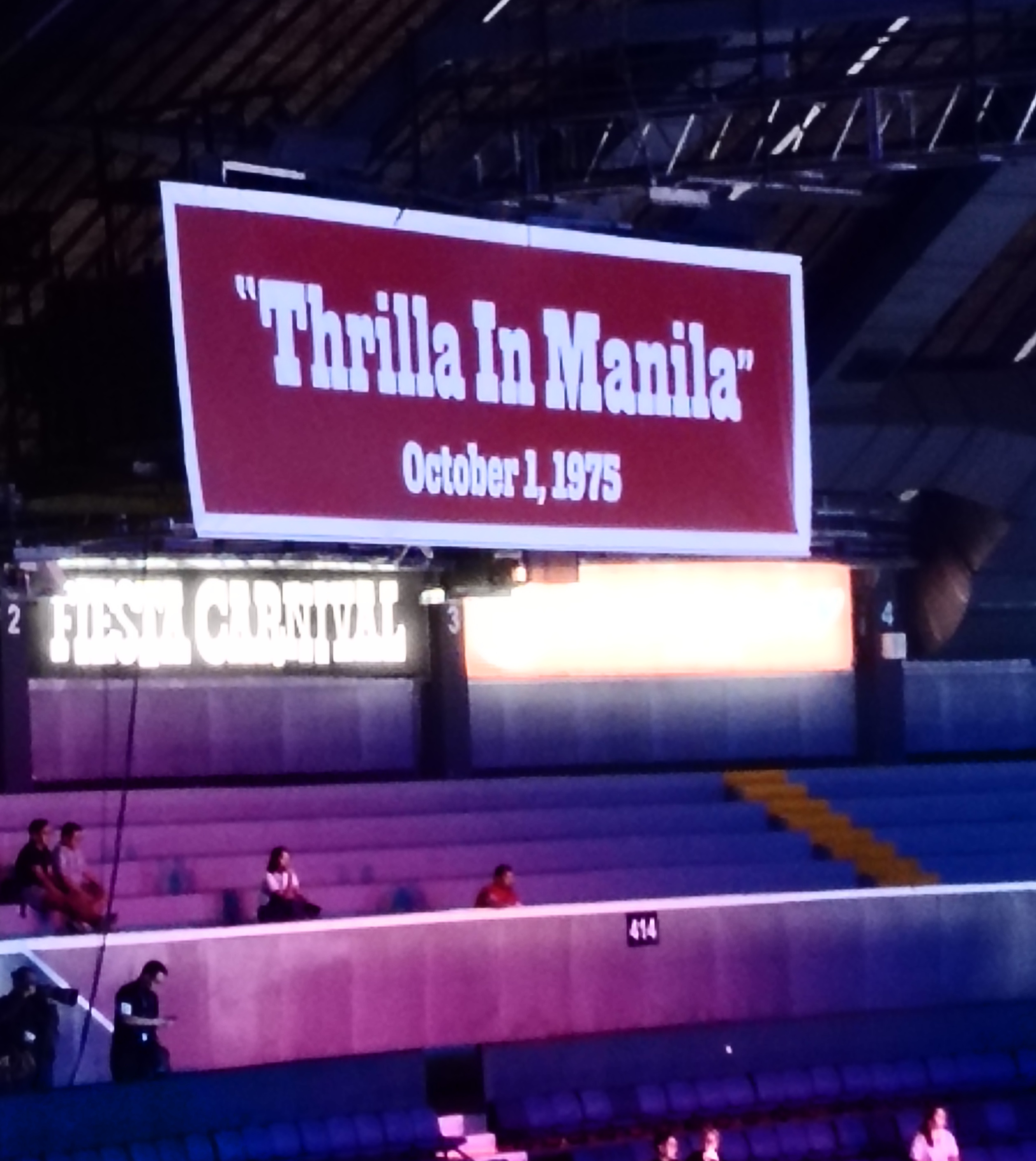
A banner at the Araneta Coliseum commemorating the fight.

In admiration of his performance, Filipino businessman Jorge Araneta—head of the Coliseum's owner Araneta Group—sought permission to name a new shopping mall under development near the arena after Muhammad Ali. Overjoyed by the proposal, Ali allowed the use of his name free-of-charge; the Ali Mall would open in 1976 as the Philippines' first multi-level commercial shopping mall.

In 2006, the Manny Pacquiao vs. Óscar Larios fight in the Philippines was unofficially billed as "Thrilla in Manila 2".

In 2008, the "Thrilla in Manila" television documentary was produced by Darlow Smithson Productions and aired on HBO. This documentary was met with mixed reviews with some accusing it of being biased towards Frazier, as most of the people interviewed were from Frazier's camp. Promoter Bob Arum called it "disgusting", said it was designed to demean Ali, and that it was filled with inaccuracies and called it an "unfair attack on Muhammad Ali".

In December 2024, Manny Pacquiao's MP Promotions announced that it would hold a card at the Araneta Coliseum in October 2025 to mark the 50th anniversary of the Thrilla in Manila. Billed as "Thrilla in Manila: 50th Anniversary", the main event featured Siyakholwa Kuse challenging Filipino boxer Melvin Jerusalem for his WBC mini flyweight title. Ali's grandson Nico Ali Walsh participated in an undercard fight against Thai boxer Kittisak Klinson.

On October 1, 2025, exactly 50 years later, NCAA Season 101 host Mapúa University took the opportunity to pause for a moment to celebrate the success of the match. The Opening Ceremonies of the annual collegiate event was held in the Araneta Coliseum, with the first game held between Mapúa and the Season 100 host Lyceum of the Philippines University.

Preceded by vs. Joe Bugner II	Muhammad Ali's bouts 1 October 1975	Succeeded by vs. Jean-Pierre Coopman
Preceded by vs. Jimmy Ellis II	Joe Frazier's bouts 1 October 1975	Succeeded by vs. George Foreman II
Awards
Preceded by George Foreman vs. Muhammad Ali	The Ring Fight of the Year; 1975	Succeeded by George Foreman vs. Ron Lyle
Preceded by George Foreman vs. Muhammad Ali; Round 8	The Ring Round of the Year; Round 12; 1975	Succeeded by George Foreman vs. Ron Lyle; Rounds 4 & 5
