= Eddie Futch =

American boxer, boxing trainer

Personal information
- Born: August 9, 1911 Hillsboro, Mississippi, U.S.
- Died: October 10, 2001 (aged 90)

Sport
- Sport: Boxing

Eddie Futch (August 9, 1911 – October 10, 2001) was an American boxing trainer. Among the fighters he trained are Joe Frazier, Ken Norton, Larry Holmes, and Trevor Berbick, four of the five men to defeat Muhammad Ali. Futch also trained Riddick Bowe and Montell Griffin when they handed future Hall of Fame fighters Evander Holyfield and Roy Jones Jr. their first professional defeats. In Baltimore, Maryland, the Futch Gym boxing gymnasium is named after the trainer. He also trained Ireland's first ever WBC World Champion, Wayne McCullough. Eddie Futch was married to Eva Marlene Futch from March 21, 1996, until his death. Futch often called her "The love of his life."

== Youth and amateur career ==
Futch was born in Hillsboro, Mississippi, but moved with his family to Detroit, Michigan when he was five years old. They lived in the Black Bottom section of the town. Always a talented athlete, he started off running track in grammar school and when a teenager, played semi-professional basketball with the Moreland YMCA Flashes. He planned to attend the YMCA College School at the University of Chicago, but when the Great Depression happened, he was forced to continue his job at the Wolverine Hotel to support his family. Here is where he met promoter and trainer Don Arnott.

In 1932, Futch won the Detroit Athletic Association Lightweight Championship, and in 1935, he won the Detroit Golden Gloves Championship. He trained at the same gym as Joe Louis, the Brewster Recreation Center Gym, and often sparred with the future champion. A heart murmur prevented Futch from turning professional, and he began training boxers.

== Hall of Fame trainer ==
Eddie Futch was an outstanding trainer. He prepared fighters to perform at the highest levels of the sport for several decades. Champions who worked under Futch's tutelage include Joe Frazier, Larry Holmes, Ken Norton, Riddick Bowe, Trevor Berbick, Michael Spinks, Alexis Arguello, Marlon Starling, Wayne McCullough, Montell Griffin, and his first world champion fighter, Don Jordan, who was crowned world welterweight champion in 1958.

== Training Joe Frazier ==
Eddie Futch was first hired by Frazier, and his chief cornerman and manager Yank Durham to help him prepare for a fight with "Scrap Iron" Johnson in 1967. He trained Frazier to stay low and constantly bob and weave, in order to create a sense of persistent motion and pressure. This also took advantage of Frazier's lack of size to make him an elusive target. It was unique fighting style that enabled him to get inside where his punches could reach his opponents without taking as much punishment as boxing with a more conventional fighting style would.

The tactic proved to be highly effective, and Frazier remained undefeated, winning the New York title from Buster Mathis, and WBA crown from Jimmy Ellis with devastating knockouts. All of which led to the inevitable showdown with Muhammad Ali in the bout promoters deemed "The Fight of the Century" which took place in March 1971 at New York's Madison Square Garden.

== Training Ken Norton to fight Ali ==
Norton recalls in his autobiography that Futch's master plan for his first Ali fight was for Ken to try to out-jab Ali. Although a pressure fighter, Norton had a good jab. Futch reckoned this would play mind games with Ali, who was so proud of his own jab. The plan seemed to work.

== Fight of the century ==
Futch developed a strategy for the first Ali fight by analysing the opponent's boxing style. Futch noted that Ali often leaned his head away from punches. Ali could not do that with his body, so the boxing proverb 'kill the body and the head dies' became the plan - Futch told Frazier to wear down Ali with persistent body punches. Futch also believed that Frazier's constant bobbing and weaving would make Ali uncomfortable because he would often have to punch down at Frazier's head (Ali almost never threw body punches), which was something he was not used to doing. Finally, Futch noticed that Ali's uppercuts were thrown sloppily and technically incorrectly (Futch said Ali threw what he thought were uppercuts). He instructed Frazier to throw a left hook over the top of Ali's right uppercuts, and told his fighter to beat Ali to the punch when doing so. When an exhausted Ali opened the 15th round by throwing a half-hearted uppercut, Frazier feinted a left and then unleashed a huge sweeping left hook at Ali's head, which floored him and created one of the most famous knock-downs in boxing history.

Frazier won the fight by a unanimous decision and was recognized as the undefeated, undisputed heavyweight boxing champion of the world.

== Manila ==
Four and a half years after the Fight of the Century, Frazier and Ali met for a third and final time in a fight known as the "Thrilla in Manila" in September 1975. Futch served as Frazier's manager and chief second for the fight, having inherited those duties from Durham who died from a stroke shortly after Frazier's defeat by George Foreman in 1973.

Futch's chief concern for the fight was that Ali not be allowed to repeat the illegal tactic of holding Frazier behind the neck, as Ali had in their 1974 second fight. This had created extended clinches that kept Frazier from throwing punches and allowed Ali to rest. Ali had won the fight with a 12th-round decision. Futch claimed that Ali had held Frazier illegally 133 times in that fight without being penalized. He had also done it against Foreman in his 1974 Zaire fight. Sensing trouble, Futch vetoed as referee (Ali-Foreman ref) Zach Clayton and two others suggested by Ali's promoter, Don King. He told Filipino authorities that Ali intended to ruin what was to be a great event for their nation by constantly tying up Frazier illegally, and suggested that they assign one of their countrymen as referee. This resulted in the appointment of Filipino Carlos Padilla, who sternly warned Ali on multiple occasions throughout the bout that he would be penalized, thus preventing him from doing it as often or effectively as he might have wished.

Futch wanted Frazier to bait Ali into throwing the uppercut again, but Ali did not do this during the fight. Futch thought the key would be for Frazier to constantly attack Ali's body, including punches to the hips when Ali effectively covered up his torso along the ropes. He told Frazier to be patient and deliberate in his attack, and to concentrate mostly on the body when Ali went into his rope-a-dope strategy so that he would not exhaust himself as Foreman had done. This proved to be effective to some extent, as it gave Ali hematomas on both hips. However, Ali's strategy of punching Frazier in the head ultimately proved more effective as it closed his one sighted eye, rendering him nearly blind in the ring.

Following the conclusion of the 14th round, during which Frazier had been repeatedly hit, Futch asked Padilla to stop. Frazier became bitter at Futch for his decision, as Ali was exhausted and, by his own admission, at the point of quitting. Futch, however, never expressed any regret over his decision.
