= Matthew Saad Muhammad =

American boxer (1954–2014)

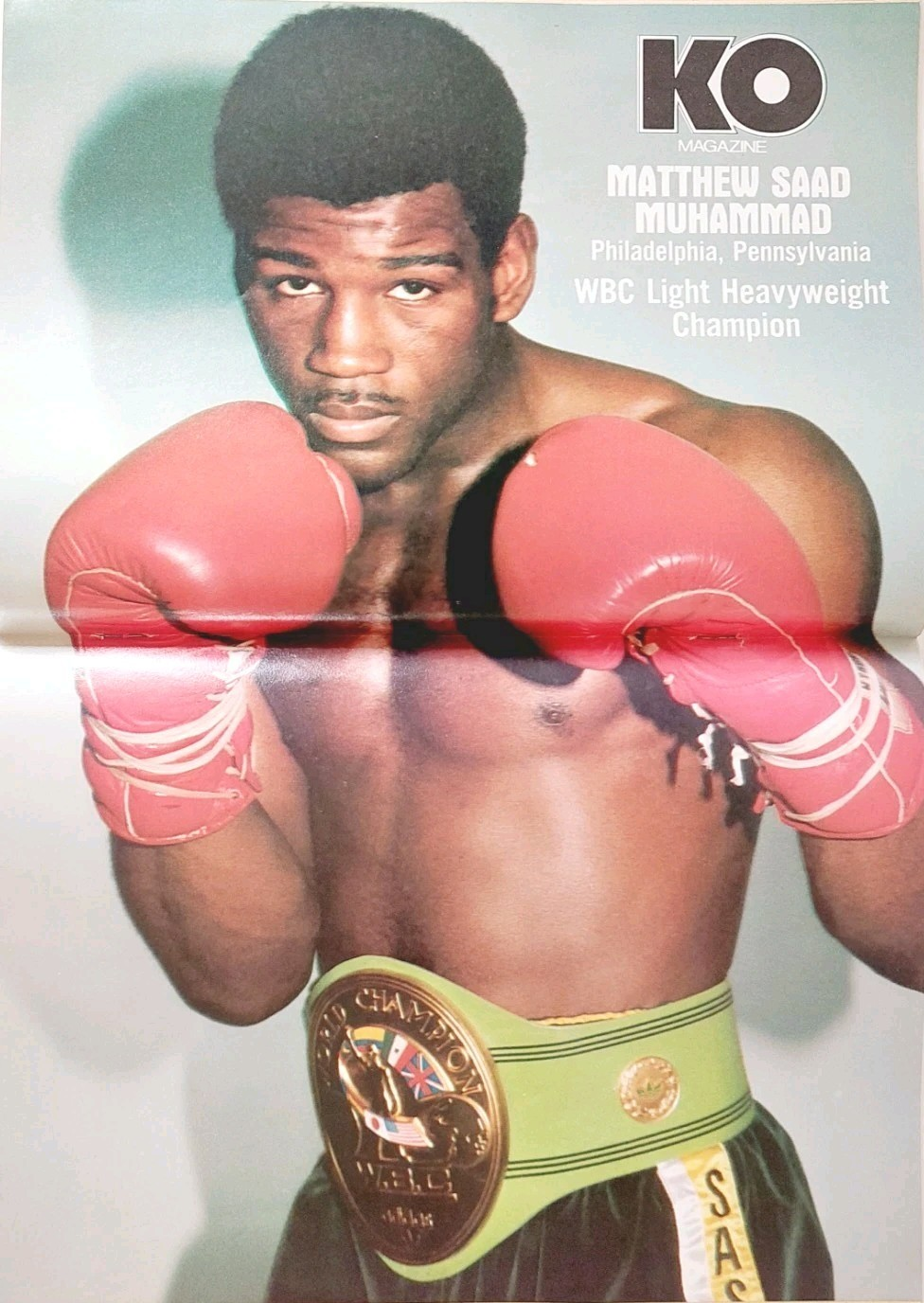
- c. 1981

Personal information
- Nickname: Miracle Matthew
- Nationality: American
- Born: (born Maxwell Antonio Loach, formerly Matthew Franklin); June 16, 1954 Philadelphia, Pennsylvania, U.S.
- Died: May 25, 2014 (aged 59) Philadelphia, Pennsylvania, U.S.
- Height: 5 ft 11 in (180 cm)
- Weight: Light heavyweight

Boxing career
- Reach: 75 in (191 cm)
- Stance: Orthodox

Boxing record
- Total fights: 58
- Wins: 39
- Win by KO: 29
- Losses: 16
- Draws: 3

Matthew Saad Muhammad (born Maxwell Antonio Loach; June 16, 1954 – May 25, 2014) was an American professional boxer who was the WBC Light Heavyweight Champion of the World for two-and-a-half years.

== Background ==
Saad Muhammad's mother died when he was an infant, and he and his elder brother were sent to live with an aunt. When he was five, his aunt could not afford to look after both of them and she instructed his brother to get rid of him. His brother took him to Philadelphia's Benjamin Franklin Parkway and then ran away. Saad was found in the early hours asleep on the steps of a church. He was then taken in by Catholic Social Services. The nuns gave him the name Matthew Franklin (after the saint and the parkway where he was found). Matthew lived in foster care until a couple from Philadelphia adopted him, raised him, and took care of him like he was their own.

Saad Muhammad was very popular in the late 1970s and early 1980s among boxing fans because of his particularly action-oriented style. Saad Muhammad was known for his ability to take punishment and mount comebacks, and because of this, he was nicknamed Miracle Matthew.

Saad Muhammad was also part of a group of world light heavyweight champions who became Muslims and changed their names during his era as a Light-Heavyweight, the others being Eddie Mustafa Muhammad (born as Eddie Gregory), and Dwight Muhammad Qawi (born as Dwight Braxton). Saad Muhammad confirmed this in interviews following his boxing career, stating that he was inspired to convert by Muhammad Ali's conversion.

== Amateur career ==
Saad Muhammad had a relatively short amateur career, consisting of only 20 amateur bouts. He won the Trenton (NJ) Golden Gloves in 1973 and turned pro the following year.

== Professional boxing career ==
Saad Muhammad began to box professionally in 1974, winning his first fight with a second-round knockout win against Billy Early. He posted seven more wins that year before suffering his first loss at the hands of Wayne McGee by a decision in six rounds.

In 1975, after two wins, he and McGee fought again, in a six-round draw. In 1976, he had two matches each with future world champions Marvin Camel and Mate Parlov.

His first fight with Parlov, in Milan, was also his first fight abroad. He beat Parlov in an eight-round decision. He then beat Camel in a ten-round decision, but lost the rematch, also in a ten-round decision. He returned to Italy for a rematch with Parlov, which resulted in a ten-round draw.

Saad Muhammad began 1977 by losing to Mustafa Muhammad (then Edward Lee Gregory), but then defeated the future three-time world champion Marvin Johnson by a knockout in round 12 for the United States Light-Heavyweight title in his first nationally televised match.

In 1978, he won all four of his bouts, including successful defenses of his title against former world title challenger Richie Kates and against four-time world title challenger Yaqui López. The Lopez fight, their first of two, was considered a classic by boxing experts, Saad Muhammad surviving a relentless attack by López to score an 11th-round knockout.

In 1979, after Johnson became world champion by defeating Parlov, he and Saad Muhammad met again on April 22 in Johnson's hometown of Indianapolis for the WBC's world light heavyweight crown . In a fight considered by many experts as a Saad Muhammad classic, and which subsequently featured on ESPN's Classic Fights show, Saad Muhammad won with an eight-round knockout after staggering Johnson towards the end of the seventh round. Shortly afterward, he converted to Islam and changed his name to Matthew Saad Muhammad.

In his first title defense, Saad Muhammad met former world champion John Conteh in Atlantic City. He retained the world title with a 15-round decision. The decision, however, was voided and a rematch ordered because Muhammad's cornermen used an illegal substance to stop the bleeding from a cut. Muhammad retained the crown with a knockout in round four in the second bout. After defeating Louis Pergaud, he and López met again, this time, with the world title on the line. Their rematch has also been shown by ESPN's classic network several times, it was the fight of the year for 1980, according to Ring Magazine, and is still written about by boxing aficionados. Saad Muhammad was hit with 20 unanswered blows in round eight, but he recovered and dropped López five times en route to a 14th-round knockout win. "This was my toughest fight," said Saad Muhammad of the fight, which some consider the closest López ever came to a world title.

He then went on to defeat Lottie Mwale, Vonzell Johnson, future world Super-Middleweight champion Murray Sutherland and Jerry Martin, all in defense of his world title, before losing to Dwight Muhammad Qawi in December 1981. In yet another fight that would later be shown on ESPN's classic network, Saad Muhammad lost his title when Qawi knocked him out in 10 rounds.

Saad Muhammad entered 1982 with a rematch against Qawi within his sights, and he defeated Pete McIntyre by a knockout in round two. The rematch between Saad Muhammad and Qawi came off in August, at Saad Muhammad's hometown of Philadelphia. The second time around, Qawi won by a knockout in round six.

From there on until 1992, Saad Muhammad fought sporadically and with limited success. He had been confronting vision problems, and in 1986, he declared himself in bankruptcy.

After he lost the rematch to Qawi fought in Australia, Spain, The Bahamas and Trinidad and Tobago.

=== MMA career ===
Saad Muhammad also took a turn in the forerunner of mixed martial arts in Japan, participating in the first UWF International (UWFi) event in 1991. Matched against Kiyoshi Tamura, Saad Muhammad talked a great deal at a lead-in press conference. He declined to say in which round he would knock Tamura out, but guaranteed a victory. Tamura submitted Saad Muhammad 34 seconds into the first round.

== Retirement from boxing ==
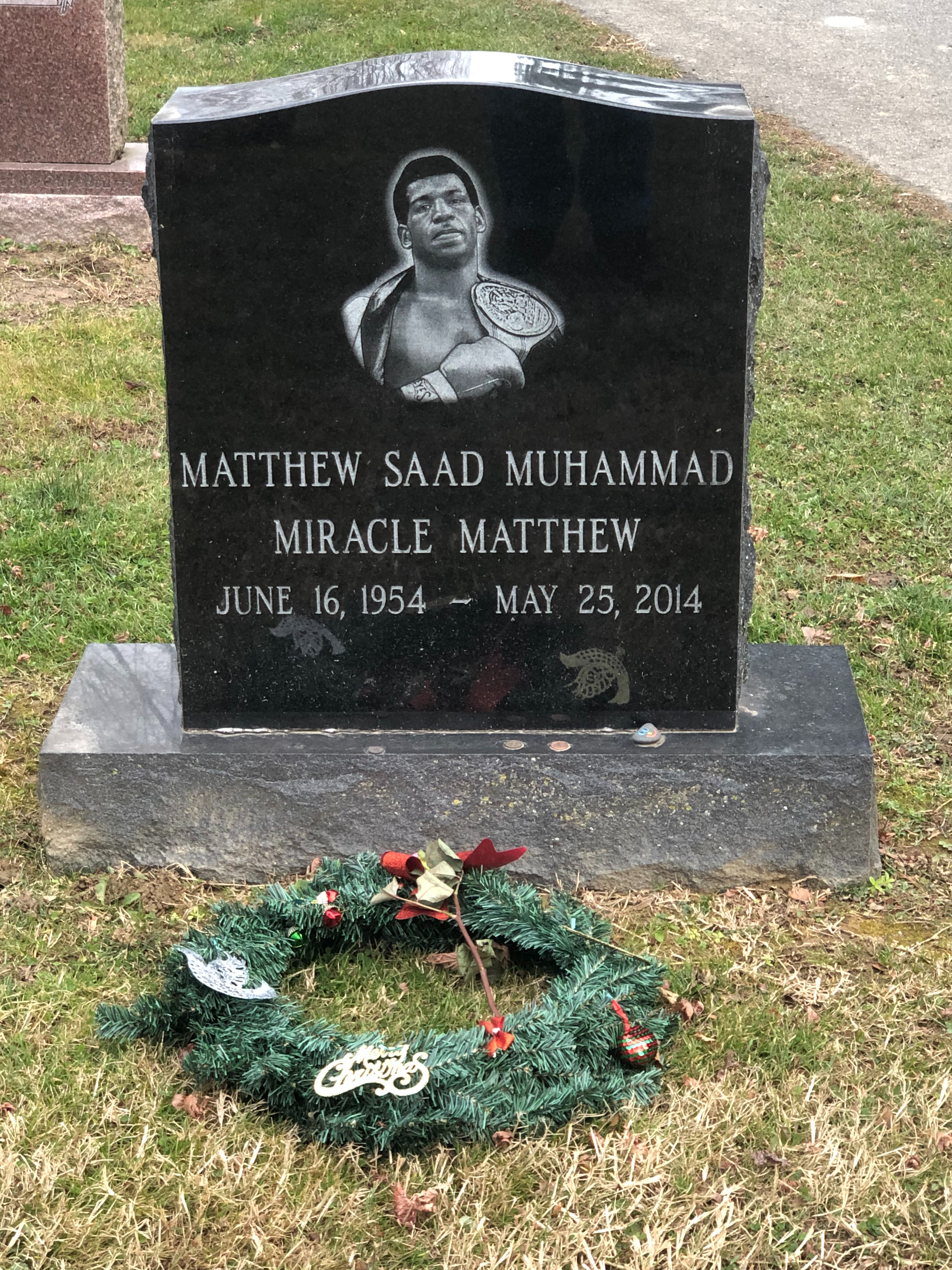
Grave of boxer Matthew Saad Muhammad at Ivy Hill Cemetery

Saad Muhammad retired from professional boxing with a record of 39 wins, 16 losses and 3 draws, with 29 wins by knockout.

In 1998, he became a member of the International Boxing Hall of Fame.

== Boxing trainer ==
Muhammad trained up and coming fighters out of Atlantic City, New Jersey and worked closely with former Indian Olympic boxing team heavyweight Gurcharan "The Guru" Singh.

== Retirement and death ==
In July 2010, Saad Muhammad was homeless and living in a shelter in Philadelphia. He later became involved in charity work in the Philadelphia area, some of which focused on raising money for the homeless. He died at a hospital in Philadelphia on May 25, 2014; his cause of death was unknown, though he was diagnosed with amyotrophic lateral sclerosis (ALS).

Muhammad was listed as number 24 on Ring Magazine's list of 100 greatest punchers of all time.

== Professional boxing record ==
58 fights	39 wins	16 losses
By knockout	29	8
By decision	10	8
Draws	3	

No.	Result	Record	Opponent	Type	Round, time	Date	Location	Notes
58	Loss	39–16–3	(United States) Jason Waller	KO	2 (8)	21/03/1992	(United States) Colonial Theatre, Fredericksburg, Virginia, U.S.	
57	Loss	39–15–3	(United States) Andrew Maynard	TKO	3 (8)	29/10/1991	(United States) Convention Center Washington, D.C., U.S.	
56	Loss	39–14–3	(United States) Mike Green	PTS	8	05/10/1991	(United States) Woodbridge, Virginia, U.S.	
55	Win	39–13–3	(United States) Govoner Chavers	KO	1 (8)	15/08/1991	Plaza de Toros de Puerto Banus, Marbella, Andalucia, Spain	
54	Loss	38–13–3	(Socialist Federal Republic of Yugoslavia) Anton Josipović	PTS	8	09/05/1991	(Socialist Federal Republic of Yugoslavia) Novi Sad, Serbia, Yugoslavia	
53	Loss	38–12–3	(United States) Ed Mack	UD	8	26/02/1991	(United States) National Guard Armory, Philadelphia, Pennsylvania, U.S.	
52	Loss	38–11–3	(Germany) Markus Bott	TKO	3 (8)	16/02/1990	Sporthalle, Wandsbek, Germany	
51	Draw	38–10–3	(Australia) Kevin Wagstaff	PTS	8	24/10/1989	Brisbane Entertainment Centre, Boondall, Queensland, Australia	
50	Loss	38–10–2	(United States) Frankie Swindell	TKO	1 (8)	21/10/1988	(United States) Quality Inn Hotel, Newark, New Jersey, U.S.	
49	Win	38–9–2	(United States) Lee Harris	TKO	1 (8)	08/04/1988	(United States) The Showplace Arena, Mechanicsville, Virginia, U.S.	
48	Win	37–9–2	(United States) Bobby Thomas	UD	10	04/12/1987	(United States) Millsap Community Center, Weirton, Virginia, U.S.	
47	Win	36–9–2	(The Bahamas) James Coakley	KO	3 (10)	26/06/1987	(The Bahamas) Nassau, Bahamas	
46	Loss	35–9–2	(The Bahamas) Pat Strachan	UD	10	30/01/1987	(The Bahamas) Nassau, Bahamas	
45	Win	35–8–2	(Colombia) Tomas Polo Ruiz	UD	10	16/11/1986	Jean Pierre Sports Complex, Mucurapo, Trinidad and Tobago	
44	Loss	34–8–2	(Jamaica) Uriah Grant	UD	10	21/02/1986	(United States) Galt Ocean Mile Hotel, Fort Lauderdale, Florida, U.S.	
43	Win	34–7–2	(United States) Chris Wells	TKO	6 (10)	10/01/1986	(United States) Diplomat Hotel, Hollywood, Florida, U.S.	
42	Loss	33–7–2	(United States) Willie Edwards	TKO	11 (12)	11/02/1984	(United States) Joe Louis Arena, Detroit, Michigan, U.S.	For NABF Light Heavyweight Title
41	Win	33–6–2	(United States) Larry Davis	TKO	10 (12)	09/09/1983	(United States) Madison Square Garden, New York City, New York, U.S.	
40	Loss	32–6–2	(United States) Eric Winbush	TKO	3 (12)	23/03/1983	(United States) Claridge Hotel & Casino, Atlantic City, New Jersey, U.S.	
39	Loss	32–5–2	(United States) Dwight Muhammad Qawi	TKO	6 (15)	07/08/1982	(United States) Spectrum, Philadelphia, Pennsylvania, U.S.	For WBC and The Ring light-heavyweight titles
38	Win	32–4–2	(United States) Pete McIntyre	TKO	2 (10)	17/04/1982	(United States) Harrah's Atlantic City, New Jersey, U.S.	
37	Loss	31–4–2	(United States) Dwight Muhammad Qawi	TKO	10 (15)	19/12/1981	(United States) Playboy Hotel & Casino, Atlantic City, New Jersey, U.S.	Lost WBC and The Ring light-heavyweight titles
36	Win	31–3–2	(United States) Jerry Martin	TKO	11 (15)	26/09/1981	(United States) Golden Nugget Casino, Atlantic City, New Jersey, U.S.	Retained WBC and The Ring light-heavyweight titles
35	Win	30–3–2	(United Kingdom) Murray Sutherland	KO	9 (15)	25/04/1981	(United States) Resorts Casino Hotel, Atlantic City, New Jersey, U.S.	Retained WBC and The Ring light-heavyweight titles
34	Win	29–3–2	(United States) Vonzell Johnson	TKO	11 (15)	28/02/1981	(United States) Ballys Park Place Hotel Casino, Atlantic City, New Jersey, U.S.	Retained WBC and The Ring light-heavyweight titles
33	Win	28–3–2	(Zambia) Lottie Mwale	KO	4 (15)	28/11/1980	(United States) Sports Arena, San Diego, California, U.S.	Retained WBC and The Ring light-heavyweight titles
32	Win	27–3–2	(Mexico) Yaqui López	TKO	14 (15)	13/07/1980	(United States) Great Gorge Playboy Club, McAfee, New Jersey, U.S.	Retained WBC and The Ring light-heavyweight titles
31	Win	26–3–2	(Cameroon) Louis Pergaud	TKO	5 (15)	11/05/1980	Halifax Metro Centre, Halifax, Nova Scotia, Canada	Retained WBC and The Ring light-heavyweight titles
30	Win	25–3–2	(United Kingdom) John Conteh	TKO	4 (15)	29/03/1980	(United States) Resorts Casino Hotel, Atlantic City, New Jersey, U.S.	Retained WBC and The Ring light-heavyweight titles
29	Win	24–3–2	(United Kingdom) John Conteh	UD	15	18/08/1979	(United States) Resorts Casino Hotel, Atlantic City, New Jersey, U.S.	Retained WBC light heavyweight title
28	Win	23–3–2	(United States) Marvin Johnson	TKO	8 (15)	22/04/1979	(United States) Market Square Arena, Indianapolis, Indiana, U.S.	Won WBC light heavyweight title
27	Win	22–3–2	(Mexico) Yaqui López	TKO	11 (12)	24/10/1978	(United States) Spectrum, Philadelphia, Pennsylvania, U.S.	Retained NABF Light Heavyweight Title
26	Win	21–3–2	(United States) Fred Bright	TKO	8 (12)	16/08/1978	(United States) Branch Brook Ice Rink, Newark, New Jersey, U.S.	
25	Win	20–3–2	(United States) Dale Grant	TKO	5 (12)	19/06/1978	(United States) Spectrum, Philadelphia, Pennsylvania, U.S.	
24	Win	19–3–2	(United States) Richie Kates	TKO	6 (12)	10/02/1978	(United States) Spectrum, Philadelphia, Pennsylvania, U.S.	Retained NABF Light Heavyweight Title
23	Win	18–3–2	(United States) Dave Lee Royster	UD	10	01/11/1977	(United States) Spectrum, Philadelphia, Pennsylvania, U.S.	
22	Win	17–3–2	(United States) Billy Douglas	TKO	6 (12)	17/09/1977	(United States) Spectrum, Philadelphia, Pennsylvania, U.S.	NABF Light Heavyweight Title.
21	Win	16–3–2	(United States) Marvin Johnson	TKO	12 (12)	26/07/1977	(United States) Spectrum, Philadelphia, Pennsylvania, U.S.	Won NABF Light Heavyweight Title
20	Win	15–3–2	(United States) Ed Turner	KO	6 (10)	23/06/1977	(United States) Arena, Philadelphia, Pennsylvania, U.S.	
19	Win	14–3–2	(United States) Joe Maye	PTS	10	21/04/1977	(United States) Fournier Hall, Wilmington, Delaware, U.S.	
18	Loss	13–3–2	(United States) Eddie Mustafa Muhammad	SD	10	11/03/1977	(United States) Arena, Philadelphia, Pennsylvania, U.S.	
17	Draw	13–2–2	(Socialist Federal Republic of Yugoslavia) Mate Parlov	PTS	10	03/12/1976	Trieste, Friuli-Venezia Giulia, Italy	
16	Loss	13–2–1	(United States) Marvin Camel	MD	10	23/10/1976	(United States) Adams Field House, Missoula, Montana, U.S.	
15	Win	13–1–1	(United States) Bobby Walker	TKO	4 (10)	15/09/1976	(United States) Catholic Youth Center, Scranton, Pennsylvania, U.S.	
14	Win	12–1–1	(United States) Marvin Camel	SD	10	17/07/1976	(United States) Stockton, California, U.S.	
13	Win	11–1–1	(Socialist Federal Republic of Yugoslavia) Mate Parlov	PTS	8	21/05/1976	Palasport di San Siro, Milan, Lombardia, Italy	
12	Win	10–1–1	(United States) Harold Carter	PTS	10	13/02/1976	(United States) Painters Mill Theatre, Owings Mills, Maryland, U.S.	
11	Draw	9–1–1	(United States) Wayne McGee	PTS	6	21/10/1975	(United States) Spectrum, Philadelphia, Pennsylvania, U.S.	
10	Win	9–1	(United States) Roosevelt Brown	TKO	4 (10)	24/07/1975	(United States) Spectrum, Philadelphia, Pennsylvania, U.S.	
9	Win	8–1	(United States) Vandell Woods	KO	6 (10)	25/02/1975	(United States) The Blue Horizon, Philadelphia, Pennsylvania, U.S.	
8	Loss	7–1	(United States) Wayne McGee	PTS	6	10/12/1974	(United States) The Blue Horizon, Philadelphia, Pennsylvania, U.S.	
7	Win	7–0	(United States) Joe Middleton	TKO	2 (10)	22/10/1974	(United States) Roller Rink, Alexandria, Virginia, U.S.	
6	Win	6–0	(United States) Lloyd Richardson	TKO	4 (10)	10/09/1974	(United States) Spectrum, Philadelphia, Pennsylvania, U.S.	
5	Win	5–0	(United States) Joe Jones	KO	3 (10)	15/07/1974	(United States) Spectrum, Philadelphia, Pennsylvania, U.S.	
4	Win	4–0	(United States) Joe Middleton	KO	5 (10)	22/05/1974	(United States) Spectrum, Philadelphia, Pennsylvania, U.S.	
3	Win	3–0	(United States) Roy Ingram	PTS	4	11/03/1974	(United States) Spectrum, Philadelphia, Pennsylvania, U.S.	
2	Win	2–0	(France) Mukeba Apolosa	PTS	4	25/02/1974	Palais des Sports, Paris, France	
1	Win	1–0	(United States) Billy Early	TKO	2 (4)	14/01/1974	(United States) Spectrum, Philadelphia, Pennsylvania, U.S.	

== See also ==
- List of world light-heavyweight boxing champions

Sporting positions
Regional boxing titles
Vacant Title last held by Lonnie Bennett	NABF light heavyweight champion July 26, 1977 – 1979; Vacated	Vacant Title next held by Jerry Martin
World boxing titles
Preceded by Marvin Johnson	WBC light heavyweight champion April 22, 1979 - December 19, 1981	Succeeded by Dwight Muhammad Qawi
Vacant Title last held by Bob Foster	The Ring light heavyweight champion November 30, 1979 - December 19, 1981	Succeeded by Dwight Muhammad Qawi
Awards
Previous: Danny Lopez vs. Mike Ayala	The Ring magazine Fight of the Year vs. Yaqui López; 1980	Next: Sugar Ray Leonard vs. Thomas Hearns
Previous: Muhammad Ali vs. Leon Spinks; Round 15	The Ring magazine Round of the Year vs. Marvin Johnson; Round 8; 1979	Next: Himself vs. Yaqui López; Round 8
Previous: Himself vs. Marvin Johnson; Round 8	The Ring magazine Round of the Year vs. Yaqui López; Round 8; 1980	Next: William Lee vs. John LoCicero; Round 5
