= Joe Frazier vs. George Foreman =

Boxing competition

The Sunshine Showdown
- Date: January 22, 1973
- Venue: National Stadium, Kingston, Jamaica
- Title(s) on the line: WBA, WBC and The Ring undisputed heavyweight titles

Tale of the tape
Boxer	Joe Frazier	George Foreman
Nickname	Smokin'	Big
Hometown	Beaufort, South Carolina, U.S.	Houston, Texas, U.S.
Pre-fight record	29–0 (25 KO)	37–0 (34 KO)
Age	29 years	24 years
Height	5 ft 11 in (180 cm)	6 ft 4 in (193 cm)
Weight	214 lb (97 kg)	217 1/2 lb (99 kg)
Style	Orthodox	Orthodox
Recognition	WBA, WBC and The Ring undisputed Heavyweight Champion	WBA/WBC; No. 1 Ranked Heavyweight

Result
- Foreman wins via 2nd-round TKO

Joe Frazier vs. George Foreman, billed as The Sunshine Showdown, was a professional boxing match in Kingston, Jamaica contested on January 22, 1973, for the WBA, WBC and The Ring heavyweight championships.

== Background ==
In a matchup between two undefeated future hall-of-famers, undisputed heavyweight champion Joe Frazier and the number one-ranked heavyweight George Foreman reached an agreement in November 1972 for a January title fight at the National Stadium in Kingston, Jamaica. Frazier was 29–0 and had won 10 consecutive heavyweight title fights at the time of his match with Foreman, first winning the NYSAC heavyweight title in 1968 and defending that title four times before knocking out Jimmy Ellis to claim Ellis' WBA and the vacant WBC titles in 1970 that had been stripped from Muhammad Ali. Frazier's most notable defense came in 1971 against Ali himself in what was billed as the "Fight of the Century". After defeating Ali by unanimous decision, Frazier captured The Ring heavyweight title and became recognized as the lineal champion. Between his first Ali fight and his bout with Foreman, Frazier successfully defended his title twice against fringe contenders Terry Daniels and Ron Stander. Following his knockout of Stander, Ali attempted to gain a rematch with Frazier, but Frazier ultimately agreed to face Foreman. The undefeated Foreman had accumulated 37 victories in just four years and was ranked number one by both the WBA and WBC at the time of landing his first title match against Frazier.

== The fight ==
External videos
- ABC broadcast of match on YouTube (via ESPN Throwback)

The fight lasted only two rounds, with Foreman scoring a technical knockout at 1:35 of the second round to dethrone Frazier and become the new undisputed heavyweight champion. Foreman brutalized Frazier for the duration of the fight, scoring six knockdowns over the champion. In ABC's television re-broadcast, Howard Cosell made the legendary exclamation: "Down goes Frazier! Down goes Frazier! Down goes Frazier!" Less than two minutes into the fight, Foreman stunned Frazier with a series of punches and then sent him down to the canvas with a right uppercut. Frazier was able to get back up but Foreman would continue his dominance and with seventeen seconds left in the round, Foreman caught Frazier with an uppercut that brought him to his knees. Shortly after Frazier rose from that knockdown, a combination from Foreman put the champion on his back and he barely made it out of the round.

I think he hurt Joe Frazier. I think Joe is hurt. Angie Dundee, Ali's trainer, right next to me is saying it, you may hear him—Down goes Frazier! Down goes Frazier! Down goes Frazier! The heavyweight champion is taking the mandatory 8-count, and Foreman is as poised as can be! In a neutral corner, he is as poised as can be. We have a minute left in this first round, and already, this fight is proving now what some have expected!

— Howard Cosell's call on ABC during the first knockdown

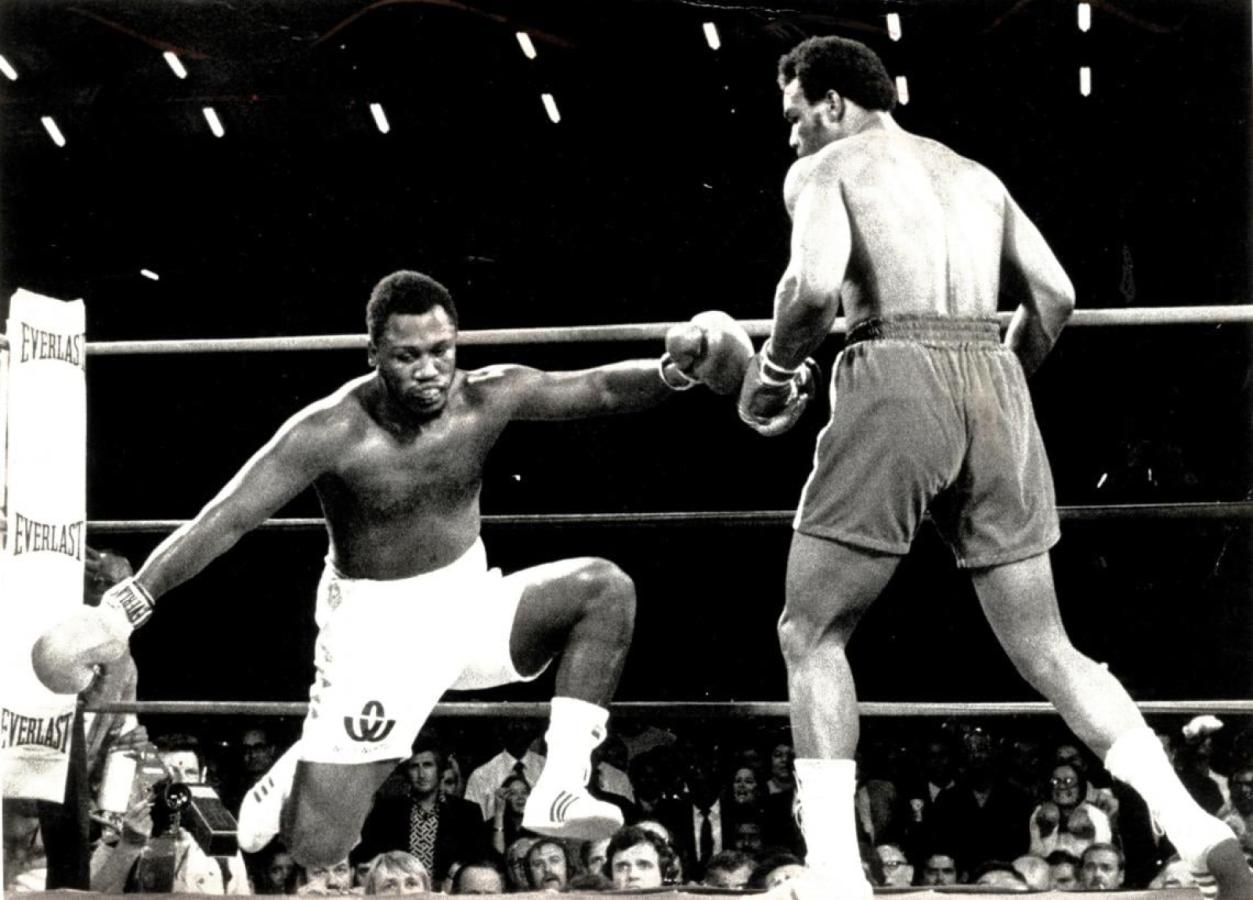
Foreman standing over Frazier during the second round

Frazier went out for the second round but Foreman knocked him down again shortly after the round began with an overhand right. Foreman then looked toward the champion's corner and was reported to say to Yancey Durham, Frazier's long time trainer, that if he did not step in and stop the fight, Foreman was going to "kill" Frazier. This was followed by a fifth knockdown, and then just as quickly Frazier fell a sixth time after a powerful right. By this time Angelo Dundee, who was at ringside scouting the bout, was pleading for the bout to be stopped. Referee Arthur Mercante Sr. finally called a halt to the bout after the sixth knockdown, and Foreman was declared the winner at 1:35 of the second round, to become, at the time, the third-youngest heavyweight champion in history (after Floyd Patterson and Muhammad Ali).

== Aftermath ==
Foreman would successfully defend his titles twice in dominating fashion. First he knocked out José Roman in the first round on September 1, 1973. He would follow this by knocking out another future hall-of-famer in the second round in Ken Norton. Foreman would lose the titles in his third defense, against Muhammad Ali in one of the most famous fights in boxing history dubbed "The Rumble in the Jungle." Following a retirement and comeback, he then became the oldest world heavyweight champion in history when he knocked out Michael Moorer in 1994 at 45 years of age.

Frazier returned to the ring in July 1973, where he defeated Joe Bugner by decision in a twelve-round bout. This set up a second fight with Ali in January 1974, which Frazier lost by decision. He would fight for the heavyweight title one more time before he retired, facing Ali in the "Thrilla in Manila" in 1975 in an unsuccessful attempt to regain what he had lost to Foreman.

In subsequent years, Cosell's shout of "Down goes Frazier!" became something of a catchphrase (usually in a humorous context), most notably by Keith Olbermann, who would often use it while narrating clips of people or animals stumbling, tripping or otherwise falling down.

== Undercard ==
Confirmed bouts:

== Broadcasting ==
Country	Broadcaster
Mexico	Televisa
Philippines	KBS 9
United Kingdom	BBC
United States	ABC/HBO

Preceded by vs. Ron Stander	Joe Frazier's bouts 16 May 1975	Succeeded by vs. Joe Bugner
Preceded by vs. Terry Sorrell	George Foreman's bouts 16 May 1975	Succeeded by vs. José Roman
Awards
Preceded by Bob Foster vs. Chris Finnegan	The Ring Fight of the Year; 1973	Succeeded by George Foreman vs. Muhammad Ali
Preceded by Muhammad Ali vs. Bob Foster; Round 5	The Ring Round of the Year; Round 2; 1973	Succeeded by George Foreman vs. Muhammad Ali; Round 8
