= The Rumble in the Jungle =

Boxing competition

Coordinates: 4.338°S 15.322°E

- Poster promoting the fight
- Date: October 30, 1974; 52 years ago
- Venue: Stade du 20 Mai, Kinshasa, Zaire
- Titles on the line: WBA, WBC, and The Ring undisputed heavyweight titles

Tale of the tape
| Boxer | George Foreman | Muhammad Ali |
| Nickname | Big | The Greatest |
| Hometown | Houston, Texas, U.S. | Louisville, Kentucky, U.S. |
| Purse | $5,000,000 | $5,000,000 |
| Pre-fight record | 40–0–0 (37 KO) | 44–2–0 (31 KO) |
| Age | 25 years, 9 months | 32 years, 9 months |
| Height | 6 ft 3 in (191 cm) | 6 ft 3 in (191 cm) |
| Weight | 220 lb (100 kg) | 216 lb (98 kg) |
| Style | Orthodox | Orthodox |
| Recognition | WBA, WBC and The Ring undisputed Heavyweight Champion | Former undisputed heavyweight champion |

Result
- Ali wins via 8th-round KO

George Foreman vs. Muhammad Ali, billed as The Rumble in the Jungle, was a heavyweight championship boxing match on October 30, 1974, at the 20th of May Stadium in Kinshasa, Zaire (now Democratic Republic of the Congo), between undefeated and undisputed heavyweight champion George Foreman and Muhammad Ali. The event had an attendance of 60,000 people and was one of the most watched televised events at the time. Ali won by knockout in the eighth round. It has been called "arguably the greatest sporting event of the 20th century", and was a major upset, with Ali coming in as a 4–1 underdog against the unbeaten, heavy-hitting Foreman. The fight is famous for Ali's introduction of the rope-a-dope tactic.

Some sources estimate that the fight was watched by as many as one billion television viewers around the world, becoming the world's most-watched live television broadcast at the time. This included a record estimated 50 million viewers watching the fight on pay-per-view or closed-circuit theater TV. The fight grossed an estimated $100 million (inflation-adjusted $700 million) in worldwide revenue. Decades later, the bout would be the subject of the Academy Award-winning documentary film When We Were Kings.

== Inception ==
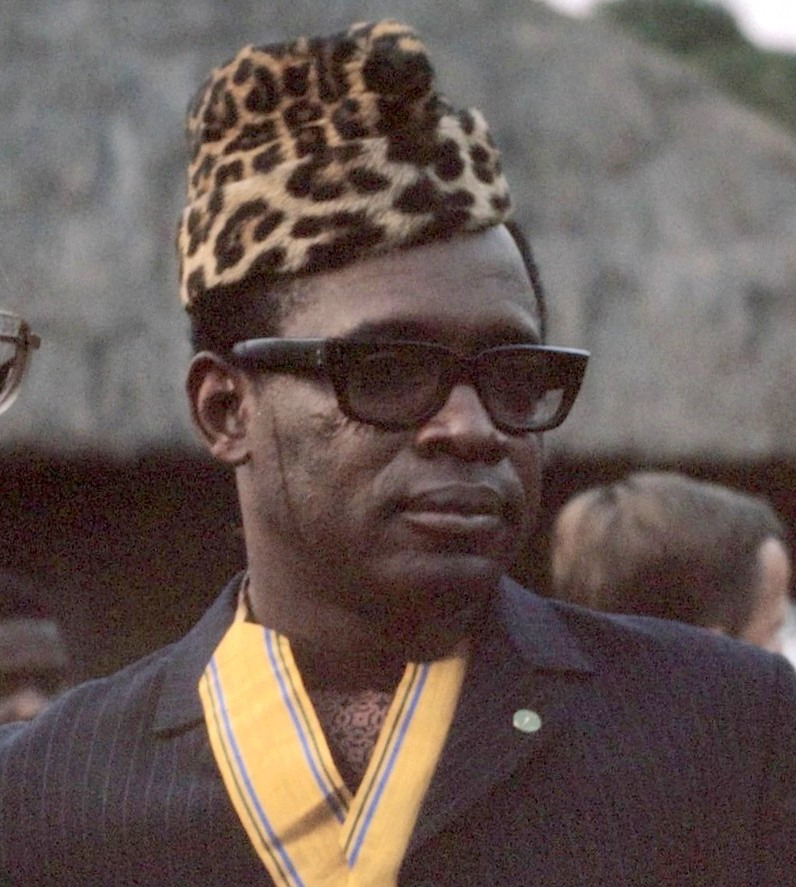
Mobutu Sese Seko agreed to hold the event in his country.

Don King arranged the fight with music businessman Jerry Masucci, who took his record label's showcase group, the Fania All-Stars, to play at the venue. King managed to get Ali and Foreman to sign separate contracts saying they would fight for him if he could get a $5 million purse. Such an amount of money, quite enormous for those days, was purported to prevent other top boxing promoters from attempts to arrange a Foreman vs. Ali match; however, as King did not have the money, and was not welcomed to stage an event of such a profile in the United States, he began seeking an outside country to stage and sponsor the event. Fred Weymar, an American advisor to Zaire's by then President Mobutu Sese Seko, persuaded Mobutu that the publicity such a high-profile event would generate would help his regime, and Mobutu agreed for the fight to be held in his country. In a TV interview, King stated that Libyan President Muammar Gaddafi was originally involved in making the payment for the purse money for the athletes and other major expenses, although the precise process was not made clear.

King had pulled together a consortium that included Risnelia Investment from Panama; the Hemdale Film Corporation, a British company founded by film producer John Daly and the actor David Hemmings, which became an official co-sponsor of the event; Video Techniques Incorporated of New York; and Don King Productions. Although King is most closely associated with the fight, Hemdale and Video Techniques Inc., with whom King was a director, were the bout's official co-promoters. The fight was broadcast on closed-circuit television in theaters in the United States and on over-the-air television throughout the world. The play-by-play commentary was done by "Colonel" Bob Sheridan. Color commentary was done by Jim Brown, David Frost, and Joe Frazier.

== Build-up and delay due to injury ==
In 1967, then-champion Ali was stripped of his title and suspended from boxing for 3 1/2 years for his refusal to comply with the draft and enter the U.S. Army. In 1970, he first regained a boxing license and promptly fought comeback fights against Jerry Quarry and Oscar Bonavena in an attempt to regain the heavyweight championship from the then-undefeated Joe Frazier. In a bout dubbed the Fight of the Century, Frazier won a unanimous decision, leaving Ali fighting other contenders for years in an attempt at a new title shot.

Meanwhile, the heavily muscled Foreman had quickly risen from a gold-medal victory at the 1968 Olympics to the top ranks of the heavyweight division. Greatly feared for his punching power, size, and sheer physical dominance, Foreman was nonetheless underestimated by Frazier and his promoters, and knocked the champion down six times in two rounds before the bout was stopped. He further solidified his hold over the heavyweight division by demolishing the only man besides Frazier at the time to defeat Ali, Ken Norton, in two rounds. At 25, the younger and stronger Foreman seemed an overwhelming favorite against the well-worn 32-year-old Ali.

The fight was originally named, "From Slaveship to Championship." This name was chosen by Don King to appeal to Black American audiences, who were a major target for travel packages from the United States to Zaire. The name was eventually changed to the "Rumble in the Jungle", after Ali created the phrase at a press conference. Foreman and Ali spent much of the middle of 1974 training in Zaire, getting acclimated to its tropical African climate. The fight was originally set to happen on September 25 (September 24 in the United States due to the difference in time zones). However, eight days prior, Foreman was cut above his right eye by an accidental elbow thrown by his sparring partner Bill McMurray in a sparring session. Foreman's cut required 11 stitches, and the date of the fight was pushed back five weeks to October 30.

A three-night-long music festival to hype the fight, Zaire 74, took place as scheduled, September 22–24, including performances by James Brown, the Pointer Sisters, Celia Cruz and the Fania All-Stars, B.B. King, Miriam Makeba, The Spinners, Bill Withers, The Crusaders, and Manu Dibango, as documented in the 2008 film Soul Power. With Zack Clayton selected as referee for the fight, the championship was scheduled for 4 am local time to appear on live closed-circuit television in the Eastern Time Zone of the US at 10 pm.

== Undercard ==
The undercard was broadcast live for the American viewers from Pittsfield, Massachusetts. The original undercard, consisting of three bouts, was scheduled for September 24. It featured several Cus D'Amato fighters with notable amateur accomplishments:

- Middleweight: Dornell Wigfall of Brockton, Massachusetts, vs. Roland Cousins of New York City (scheduled for 6 rounds)
- Middleweight: Joey Hadley of Catskill, New York, vs. Cove Green of Bridgeport, Connecticut (scheduled for 4 rounds)
- Light heavyweight: Bobby Stewart of Amsterdam, New York, vs. Charley Scott of New York City (scheduled for 6 rounds)

However, it was cancelled after the fight was rescheduled due to Foreman's cut.

The rescheduled undercard took place on October 29:

- Featherweight: Terry Rondeau of Pittsfield, Massachusetts, former New England featherweight champion, was introduced in the ring before the Osborne vs. Romano fight.
- Junior middleweight (for the New England Junior middleweight title): Paul Osborne of Lowell, Massachusetts, won by a fourth-round technical knockout over Al Romano of North Adams, Massachusetts.
- Middleweight: Joey Hadley (160 lbs) of Catskill, New York, won by a first-round technical knockout (scheduled for four) over Gene Orten (164) of Springfield, Massachusetts.
- Light heavyweight: Bobby Stewart (174 lbs) of Amsterdam, New York, won by unanimous decision (sixth) over Ken Jones (168) of Somers, Connecticut.

== Fight ==
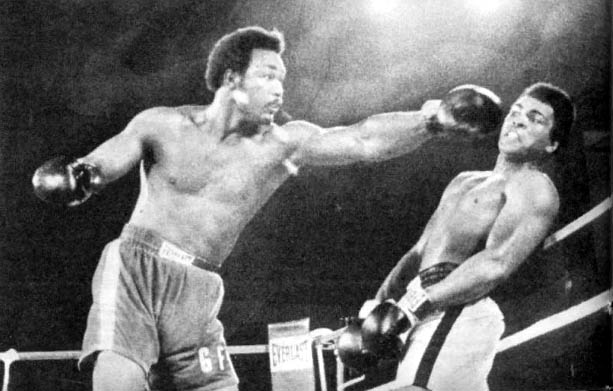
Foreman trying to punch Ali

Ali was famed for his speed and technical skills, while Foreman's raw power was his greatest strength. Defying convention, Ali began by attacking Foreman with disorienting right-hand leads. This was notable as it seemed that close-range fighting would inevitably favor Foreman and leave too great a chance that Ali would be stunned by Foreman's powerful haymakers. Ali made use of the right-hand lead punch (striking with the right hand without setting up the left) in a further effort to disorient Foreman. However, while this aggressive tactic may have surprised Foreman and allowed Ali to punch him several times in the head, it failed to significantly hurt him. Before the end of the first round, Foreman began to catch up to Ali, landing punches of his own. Foreman had been trained to cut off the ring and prevent escape. Ali realized that he would tire if Foreman could keep making one step to Ali's two, so he changed tactics.

Ali had told his trainer, Angelo Dundee, and his fans that he had a secret plan for Foreman. As the second round commenced, Ali began to lean on the ropes and cover up, letting Foreman punch him on the arms and body (a strategy Ali later dubbed the rope-a-dope). As a result, Foreman spent his energy throwing punches (without earning points) that either did not hit Ali or were deflected in a way that made Foreman hitting Ali's head difficult, while sapping Foreman's strength due to the large number of punches he threw. This loss of energy was key to Ali's rope-a-dope tactic.

Meanwhile, Ali took every opportunity to shoot straight punches to Foreman's face (which was soon visibly puffy). When the two fighters were locked in clinches, Ali consistently out-wrestled Foreman, using tactics such as leaning on Foreman to make Foreman support Ali's weight, and holding down Foreman's head by pushing on his neck. He constantly taunted Foreman in these clinches, telling him to throw more punches, and an enraged Foreman responded by doing just that.

After several rounds of this, Foreman began to tire. His face became increasingly damaged by hard, fast jabs and crosses by Ali. The effects were visible as Foreman was staggered by an Ali combination at the start of the fourth round, and again several times near the end of the fifth, after Foreman had seemed to dominate that round. Although Foreman kept throwing punches and coming forward, after the fifth round, he looked increasingly worn out. Ali continued to taunt him by saying, "They told me you could punch, George!" and "They told me you could punch as hard as Joe Louis." According to Foreman: "I thought he was just one more knockout victim until, about the seventh round, I hit him hard to the jaw and he held me and whispered in my ear: 'That all you got, George?' I realized that this ain't what I thought it was."

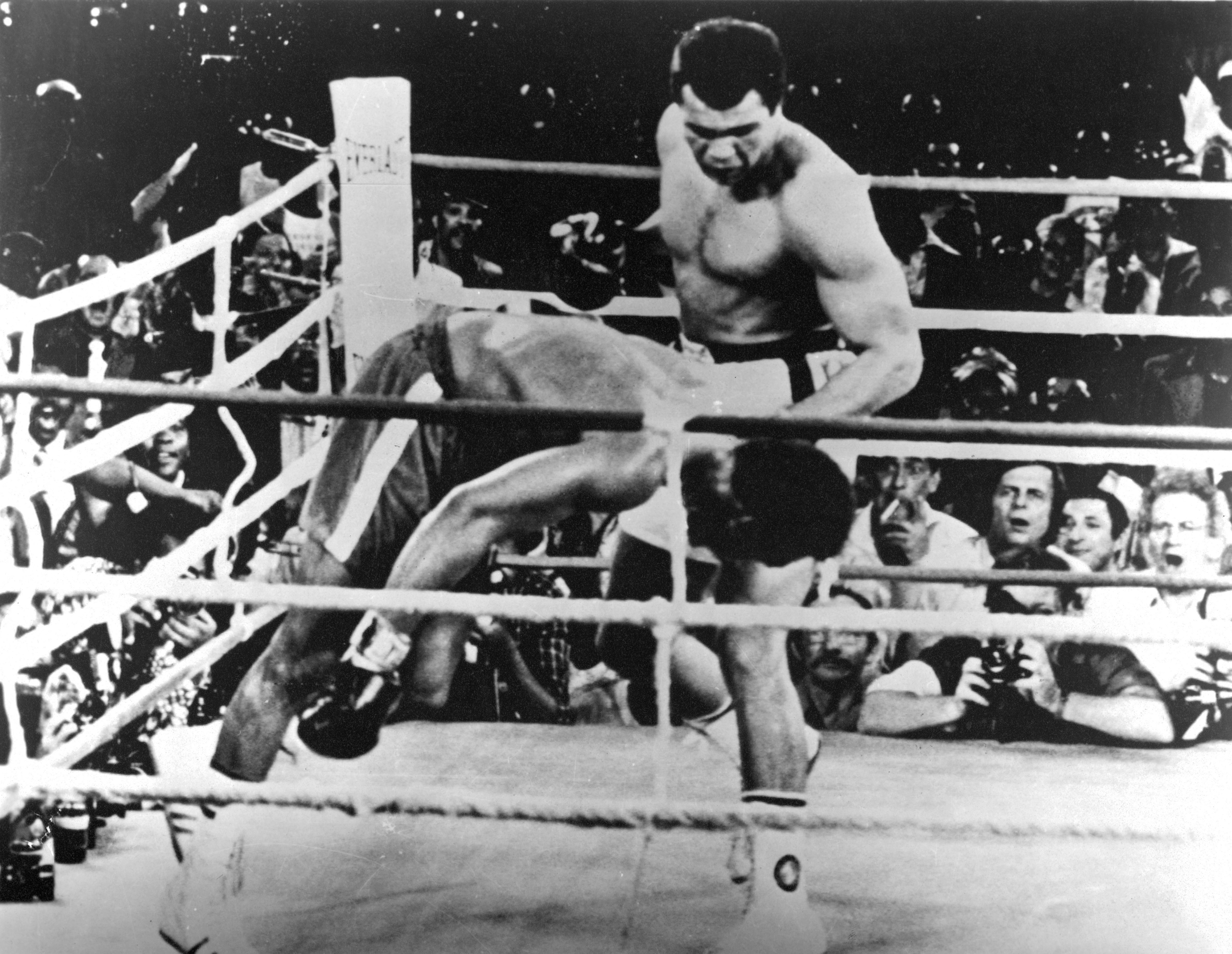
Foreman falling to the canvas after a hard right straight to the face

As the fight drew into the eighth round, Foreman's punching and defense became ineffective as the strain of throwing so many wild shots took its toll. Ali pounced as Foreman tried to pin Ali on the ropes, landing several right hooks over Foreman's jab, followed by a five-punch combination, culminating in a left hook that brought Foreman's head up into position and a hard right straight to the face that caused Foreman to stumble to the canvas. Foreman rose to one knee but referee Zack Clayton signaled the end of the fight before Foreman got to his feet. At the stoppage, Ali led on all three scorecards by 68–66, 70–67, and 69–66.

The fight showed that Ali was capable of taking a punch and highlighted his tactical genius, changing his fighting style by adopting the rope-a-dope, instead of his former style that emphasized movement to counter his opponent. The film of the Zaire fight shows Foreman striking Ali with hundreds of thunderous blows, many blocked, but many others getting through. Foreman mostly struck to the sides and kidney region, but also landed some vicious shots to the head, seemingly with no effect.

Despite repeatedly calling Ali out, Foreman was unable to secure a rematch with the champion before Foreman abruptly decided to retire after a loss to Jimmy Young in 1977. Ali did not hurry to set up a rematch, making title defenses against unheralded opponents such as Jean Pierre Coopman and Richard Dunn. However, he repeatedly stated that his rematch with Foreman was one of the major fights he wanted to get to before retiring.

== Foreman and Ali ==
Foreman and Ali became friends after the fight. Ali had trouble walking to the stage at the 1996 Oscars to be part of the group receiving the Oscar for When We Were Kings (1996), a documentary of the fight in Zaire, due to his Parkinson's syndrome. Foreman helped him up the steps to receive the Oscar. Over the years, Foreman revised his opinions on Ali and on The Rumble in the Jungle, on several accounts. In 2012, The Daily Telegraph reported Foreman's declaration: "We fought in 1974, that was a long time ago. After 1981 we became the best of friends. By 1984, we loved each other. I am not closer to anyone else in this life than I am to Muhammad Ali." Foreman also stated: "Then, in 1981, a reporter came to my ranch and asked me: 'What happened in Africa, George?' I had to look him in the eye and say, 'I lost. He beat me.' Before that I had nothing but revenge and hate on my mind, but from then on it was clear. I'll never be able to win that match, so I had to let it go."

== Viewership and revenue ==
The fight was broadcast live on pay-per-view on closed-circuit television, also known as theater television, to venues across the world. The fight had a record estimated 50 million viewers on closed-circuit television worldwide, grossing an estimated $100 million (inflation-adjusted $650 million) in revenue. In the United States, the fight had an estimated three million closed-circuit viewers in 400 venues, with tickets sold at $20 (inflation-adjusted $130), grossing $60 million (inflation-adjusted $390 million) in the United States. The promoters and fighters received over half of the US closed-circuit revenue, generating an income of at least $30 million for the promoters and fighters; Ali and Foreman were paid a record $5 million each. It had a large television audience in the United Kingdom, where the fight was watched by 26 million viewers on BBC One, nearly half of the UK's 56 million population in 1974. In total, including closed-circuit and free television, the fight was reported to have been watched by a record estimated television audience of one billion viewers worldwide, about a quarter of the world's four billion population in 1974, as the world's most-watched live television broadcast at the time.

== Legacy ==
The Rumble in the Jungle is one of Ali's most famous fights, ranking alongside 1971's Fight of the Century between the unbeaten former champion Ali and the unbeaten then-heavyweight champion Joe Frazier, and the pair's final match, the Thrilla in Manila in 1975.

=== Fan reactions ===
When Ali arrived in Zaire, now known as the Democratic Republic of the Congo, he was greeted with adoration. In the eyes of the people of Zaire, Ali was like a representation of the struggles of their country, which only 12 years earlier had gained independence after Belgian colonial rule followed by long-lasting turmoil. A chant for Ali took little time to form. They chanted "Ali boma ye", translating "Ali, kill him". The events surrounding the fight, such as its musical acts (B.B. King, the Fania All Stars, and James Brown, among others), added to its cultural impact. The concert portion of the event was later featured in the documentary Soul Power. In a 2002 UK poll conducted by Channel 4, the British public voted the fight as number seven in the list of the 100 Greatest Sporting Moments.

=== Film ===
- The Greatest (1977) is a biographical film starring Ali himself that includes the fight in its climax.
- When We Were Kings (1996) is an Academy Award-winning documentary film that depicts the events before and during this bout. (The film's editor directed a separate documentary about the concurrent Zaire 74 music festival; Soul Power was released in 2009.)
- Don King: Only in America (1997) is an HBO made-for-TV movie that depicts the buildup to the fight and the maneuvers that King had to perform to set it up, as well as numerous scenes that show the way Ali gained the favor of the people of Zaire.
- Ali (2001) is a biographical feature film that depicts The Rumble in the Jungle as the film's climax.
- Big George Foreman (2023) is a biographical feature film that depicts The Rumble in the Jungle.

=== Literature and print journalism ===
- Muhammad Ali discusses The Rumble in the Jungle in his autobiography The Greatest: My Own Story.
- George Foreman and Joel Engel discuss The Rumble in the Jungle, the controversies, and the lasting impact it had on Foreman in his autobiography By George: The Autobiography of George Foreman.
- Barbara Kingsolver's novel, The Poisonwood Bible (1998), includes a passage describing The Rumble in the Jungle taking place at the Stade du 20 Mai (20 May Stadium) while political prisoners were locked up downstairs.
- Norman Mailer was part of the press corps sent to cover the event and later wrote a book, The Fight (1975), describing the events, and placing them within the context of his views of black American culture.
- George Plimpton was part of the press corps, covering the fight for Sports Illustrated, and later featured it in detail in the book Shadow Box (1993).
- Hunter S. Thompson was sent to cover the event for Rolling Stone, though, according to TIME, Thompson "chose to float in his hotel pool, a bottle of hooch in hand, while the great fight took place, and he was unable to file anything."

=== Museum exhibits ===
The robe worn by Muhammad Ali in this fight is part of the collections of National Museum of American History at the Smithsonian Institution together with a pair of gloves he used in training for the fight.

=== Music ===
Several songs were written and released about the fight. For example:

- Orchestre G.O. Malebo, a Zairean band of the 1970s, composed the song "Foreman Ali Welcome to Kinshasa" in honor of the event.
- Fugees wrote a song about the event with A Tribe Called Quest, Busta Rhymes, and John Forté titled "Rumble in the Jungle" for the soundtrack of When We Were Kings. It reached number three in the United Kingdom, number 10 in Ireland, number 13 in New Zealand and Finland, number 36 in Sweden, and number 85 in Germany.
- The Game wrote a song titled "Ali Bomaye".
- The Hours wrote a song about the event titled "Ali in the Jungle".
- Johnny Wakelin wrote a song about the match called "In Zaire".
- Fleet Foxes reference the event in their song "I Should See Memphis".

=== Television ===
- The incident was covered in a season-three episode of ESPN Classic's The Top 5 Reasons You Can't Blame..., which argued that Foreman should not be harshly judged for losing the fight.
- On the April 30, 2011, episode of ABC's Winners Bracket, the Rumble in the Jungle was named the greatest moment in the history of ABC's Wide World of Sports.
- The fight (along with the TV coverage on ESPN Classic) was referenced in "Crosshairs", the seventh episode of the first season of the Netflix series The Punisher as Ali, who was not expected to win at the time, changed up his strategy in order to tire Foreman out.
- The cult Serbian series Državni posao (The State Job) mentioned this event in the episode "Lov" ("Hunting").
- In the NewsRadio episode "In Through the Out Door", Matthew makes a bet with Joe on the boxing match, unaware it had already taken place over two decades prior. Matthew takes George Foreman and loses the bet.
- In the Everybody Loves Raymond episode "Bully on the Bus", Frank discovers that his granddaughter Ally has been bullying a fellow student, and his response is to shout "Ally, boma ye!"
- This fight, and its documentary film When We Were Kings, are parodied in S4E4 of the mockumentary television show Documentary Now!.

=== Theater ===
- A theatrical recreation of the fight and its buildup, Rumble In The Jungle Rematch, ran in London in 2023.

| Preceded by vs. Ken Norton | George Foreman's bouts 30 October 1974 | Succeeded by vs. Ron Lyle |
| Preceded by vs. Joe Frazier II | Muhammad Ali's bouts 30 October 1974 | Succeeded by vs. Chuck Wepner |
Awards
| Preceded by Joe Frazier vs. George Foreman | The Ring Fight of the Year; 1974 | Succeeded by Muhammad Ali vs. Joe Frazier III |
| Preceded by Joe Frazier vs. George Foreman; Round 2 | The Ring Round of the Year; Round 8; 1974 | Succeeded by Muhammad Ali vs. Joe Frazier III; Round 12 |
| Preceded by Muhammad Ali vs. Ken Norton | The Ring Upset of the Year; 1974 | Succeeded by John H. Stracey vs. Jose Napoles |
