= Muhammad Ali vs. Jerry Quarry II =

Double Jeopardy
- Date: June 27, 1972
- Venue: Las Vegas Convention Center, Las Vegas, Nevada
- Title(s) on the line: NABF heavyweight title

Tale of the tape
Boxer	(United States) Muhammad Ali	(United States) Jerry Quarry
Nickname	"The Greatest"	"Irish"
Hometown	Louisville, Kentucky	Bakersfield, California
Purse	$500,000	$200,000
Pre-fight record	36–1 (25 KO)	43–6–4 (26 KO)
Age	30 years, 5 months	27 years, 1 month
Height	6 ft 3 in (191 cm)	6 ft 0 in (183 cm)
Weight	216 1/2 lb (98 kg)	198 lb (90 kg)
Style	Orthodox	Orthodox
Recognition	WBA/WBC; No. 1 Ranked Heavyweight; NABF heavyweight champion Former undisputed heavyweight champion	WBA/WBC; No. 2 Ranked Heavyweight

Result
- Ali defeated Quarry via 7th round TKO

Muhammad Ali vs. Jerry Quarry II, billed as Double Jeopardy, was a professional boxing match contested on June 27, 1972, for the NABF heavyweight championship. Ali won on a TKO after the referee stopped the fight at Ali's request.

== Background ==
Ali called Quarry “the last of the white hopes” and described himself and Bob Foster as the soul brothers. Foster was facing Quarry's brother Mike as the first half of a double header.

Ali was rated a 5‐1 favourite going into the bout.

== The fight ==
Quarry did better than in their first fight but once again struggled to close the distance with Ali, who once again dominated most of the fight from the outside. Quarry was hurt going into the seventh round, and after landing several unanswered shots, Ali signaled to the referee to stop the fight, which he did shortly afterwards.

== Aftermath ==
Speaking after Foster's successful defence, his promoter Lou Viscusi suggesting he might move up to face Ali saying “I'd like to try that left for size on Ali”.

== Undercard ==
Confirmed bouts:

== Broadcasting ==
Country	Broadcaster
Mexico	Telesistema Mexicano
Philippines	ABS-CBN
United Kingdom	ITV

Preceded by vs. George Chuvalo II	Muhammad Ali's bouts 27 June 1972	Succeeded by vs. Al Lewis
Preceded by vs. Larry Middleton	Jerry Quarry's bouts 27 June 1972	Succeeded by vs. Randy Neumann
