= Jerry Quarry =

American boxer (1945–1999)

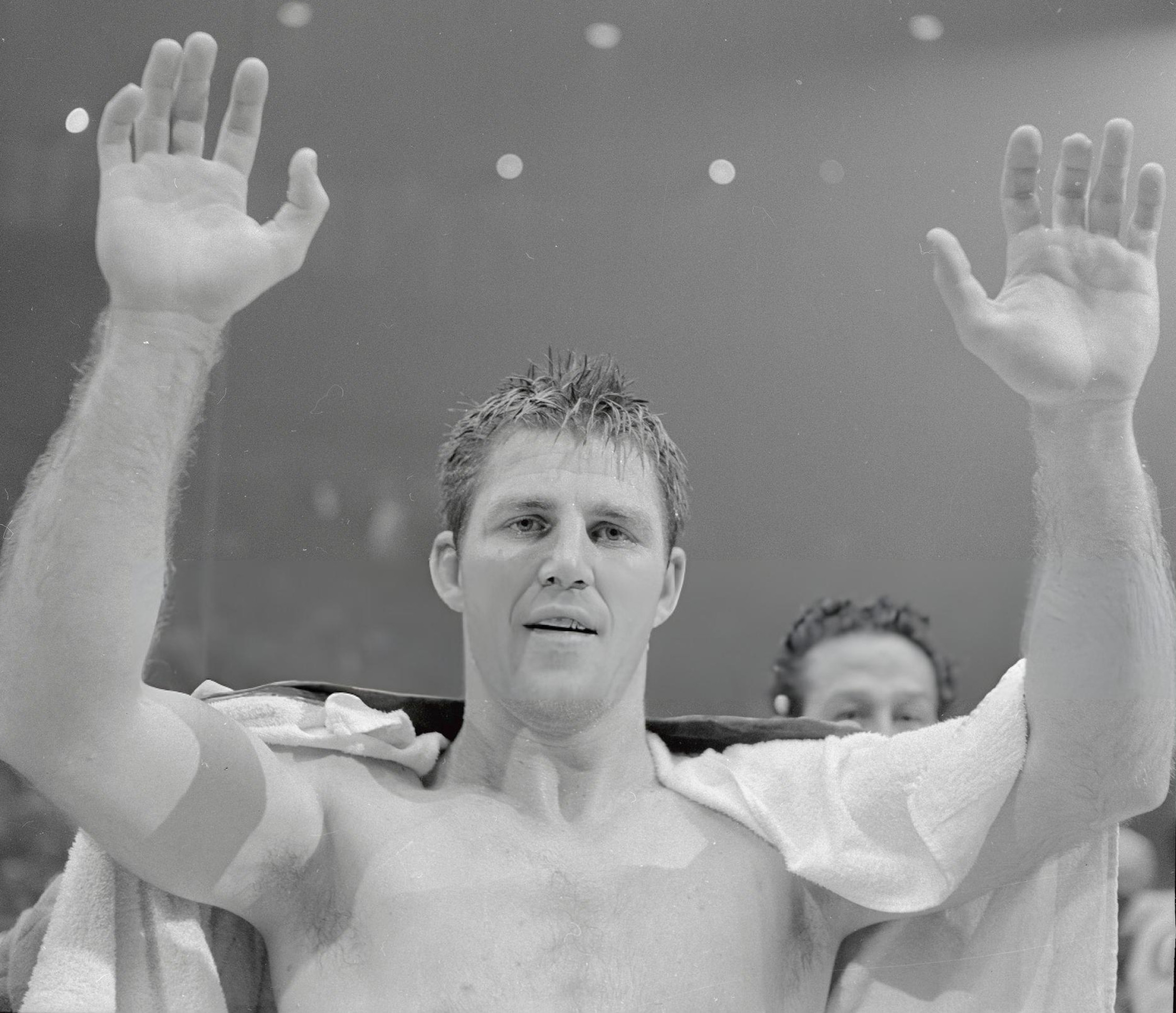
- Quarry in 1968, after winning his fight against Thad Spencer

Personal information
- Nicknames: Irish; The Bellflower Bomber
- Born: May 15, 1945 Bakersfield, California, U.S.
- Died: January 3, 1999 (aged 53) Templeton, California, U.S.
- Height: 6 ft 0 in (183 cm)
- Weight: Cruiserweight; Heavyweight

Boxing career
- Reach: 72 in (183 cm)
- Stance: Orthodox

Boxing record
- Total fights: 66
- Wins: 53
- Win by KO: 32
- Losses: 9
- Draws: 4

Jerry Quarry (May 15, 1945 – January 3, 1999), nicknamed "Irish" or "the Bellflower Bomber" or the "Great White Hope", was an American professional boxer and multiple heavyweight boxing title contender. During the peak of his career from 1968 to 1971, Quarry was a popular figure in boxing, featured on the cover of The Ring and other boxing magazines, as well as on hit TV shows. His most famous bouts were against Muhammad Ali. He is regarded as being one of the best heavyweight boxers never to win a title. He beat former world heavyweight champion Floyd Patterson and top contenders Ron Lyle, Earnie Shavers, Brian London, Thad Spencer, Buster Mathis, Randy Neumann, Jack Bodell, Mac Foster and Eduardo Corletti. The damage he accumulated from lack of attention to defense against larger men at the top level, no head guard sparring, and attempted comebacks in 1977, 1983, and 1992 resulted in Quarry developing an unusually severe case of dementia pugilistica.

== Boxing career ==
=== Early life ===
Quarry's family includes three other pro boxers (his father and two brothers). Younger brother Mike Quarry became a light-heavyweight boxing contender. Jerry's father first put gloves on him when he was five years old. Jerry fought first as a Junior Amateur, winning his first trophies at the age of eight. Later, he contracted nephritis, a debilitating illness which sidelined him for years.

Quarry came to notice by winning the 1965 National Golden Gloves championship in Kansas City at age 19. Weighing just 183 pounds, Quarry knocked out each of his five opponents in the tournament, a feat unmatched. Quarry had over 200 fights in his amateur career. He turned professional in 1965.

=== In 1960s ===
Despite starting in May, Quarry had 14 matches in 1965 at the start of his pro career. Many of his early career fights took place at the Olympic Auditorium in Los Angeles, where he became established as a draw. Quarry supplemented meager boxing pay by working as a tire changer at a Greyhound bus terminal. He had three draws on his record by the time of his first loss, which came in his 21st bout in July 1966 against crafty spoiler Eddie Machen, known for his feat of breaking Sonny Liston's run of knockouts.

Quarry had various television roles in series TV of the period. One notable role was as himself, in the episode "The Strongest Man In The World" of I Dream of Jeannie, which aired on November 18, 1968.

==== Championship Tournament ====
In mid-1967, the World Boxing Association (W.B.A.) held a tournament to replace Muhammad Ali, who had been stripped of his title for refusing induction into the military after being drafted. The tournament was expanded to include eight heavyweights, and did not include Joe Frazier, who had accepted a title belt outside the WBA.

When the tournament was expanded, Quarry was included. Quarry's first tournament bout was a rematch of his fourth draw fight earlier that year against former world champion Floyd Patterson.

In both matches, Quarry dominated the early rounds with multiple knockdowns of Patterson, but faded in the latter stages. He hung on better in the second bout, and was given a split-decision victory. His second tournament match was a KO win against fellow Californian Thad Spencer, who was highly lauded and ranked coming into the match. In the final against crafty ex-middleweight Jimmy Ellis, Quarry prior to the bout sustained a broken back from an injury on the diving board at a pool that later developed into gangrene.

Ellis was wary of Quarry's unorthodox tactic (displayed to great effect against Patterson) of retreating into the ropes then catching his opponent with a sudden two-fisted attack and Quarry lost a majority decision. After a layoff of six months, Quarry returned after the Ellis loss to post another streak of wins. Notable among these was a lopsided 12-round decision win over 1964 U.S. Olympian Buster Mathis. The win over the ranked (and much bigger) Mathis positioned Quarry for his second title shot.

==== Frazier and Chuvalo ====
Joe Frazier had not yet KO'd Ellis, but was considered by many to be the most legitimate heavyweight champion. Quarry met Frazier June, 23rd, 1969 at New York City's Madison Square Garden, where Quarry could count on fan support. Back in Quarry's home state of California, The San Bernardino County Sun proclaimed him the latest "Great White Hope".

Frazier's high-tempo pressure came to dominate the fight. In the 7th round, Quarry was bleeding from his nose and had a very large cut under his eye when he took a series of hard punches without moving away or hitting back. The fight was stopped with a Frazier TKO. Ring Magazine named it the fight of the year.

Returning quickly after the loss to Frazier, Quarry won two bouts before meeting Canadian George Chuvalo in December 1969. The bout against Chuvalo, then unranked, would be the subject of controversy. Quarry was well ahead, when in the seventh round, Chuvalo knocked Quarry down. Quarry rose at the count of four, then took a knee but on rising exactly at the count of ten, he found referee Zach Clayton ruled a KO.

=== In 1970s ===
Quarry returned quickly after the controversial loss to Chuvalo to post another streak of wins. Noteworthy among them was a 6th-round KO win over fellow Californian Mac Foster. Foster came into the bout ranked #1 with a record of 24–0, with all 24 wins by KO. Quarry was ranked #6, and weighed 195 for the bout. Foster weighed 215. It was a very impressive, dominating win by Quarry which figured to put him back in line for another title shot.

At this time, exiled former champion Muhammad Ali had successfully sued to win the right to return as a professional boxer. Ali approached every one of the ten ranked heavyweights for a match. Quarry was the only one willing to face him, and so got the nod for the first bout against Ali in his return. The bout received tremendous publicity and arguably remains today as Quarry's most famous bout.

The bout took place at the City Auditorium in Atlanta, Georgia on October 26, 1970. Ali dominated the first two rounds, moving well and scoring with his left jab and combinations. Quarry was able to land only a handful of punches, most of them glancing blows. In the third round, Quarry was badly cut by a right hand over his left eye following an exchange with Ali. Trainer Teddy Bentham, a veteran cutman, realized the cut was too severe for Quarry to continue, even though he argued to continue. Referee Tony Perez waved the bout over before the start of the 4th round, which was ruled a 3rd round technical KO. Quarry disputed the decision and demanded a rematch against Ali, which he would later receive.

Following the loss to Ali, Quarry had his second six-month layoff. He focused on television roles during this period, appearing on a number of television shows. In June 1971, he returned to start another streak of wins. Noteworthy among them was a revenge of his earlier draw against tall Tony Doyle at the Playboy Club in Lake Geneva, Wisconsin with a lopsided decision. He then KO'd British and European champion Jack Bodell in the first round. That fight was held in London. His second fight there during this streak was against Larry Middleton. Middleton was the kind of tall, quick boxer with long reach who often gave Quarry trouble in bouts. Quarry won a very narrow, controversial decision against Middleton.

By then, Quarry had lobbied long and hard for a rematch against Ali. He finally was allowed that rematch a month after the Middleton bout. The second bout against Ali took place at the Las Vegas Convention Center on June 27, 1972. Their match was the headlining bout of a fight card that Ali called "The Soul Brothers Versus The Quarry Brothers." Bob Arum promoted the fight, with Ali playing up the obvious racial differences between his black fighters and the white Quarrys. In an earlier bout, Jerry's brother Mike, a high-ranked light heavyweight contender was KO'd by Light heavyweight champion and devastating puncher Bob Foster, and seriously injured.

Ali weighed 216 for their bout, Quarry 198. The bout was eventful. At the opening bell, Quarry rushed Ali, got under his shoulders and lifted him briefly off the canvas before referee Mike Kaplan separated the fighters. Ali dominated most of the fight, using his jab. Visibly tired at the end of the 6th round, Quarry came out for the seventh and was hit by a half-dozen shots by Ali, who waved the referee in to stop the fight, which Quarry protested. Nevertheless, the fight was stopped in favor of Ali.

==== Bouncing back ====
After his round with Ali, Quarry, now managed by Gil Clancy, recorded several victories. During this period, his performance in 1973 was marked one of his more active years in his heavyweight career.

Despite deterioration in his movement and reflexes, and now having very scarred facial tissue, Quarry gave possibly the two best performances of his career next. After defeating Randy Neumann (21–2) in January, Quarry was placed into a bout similar to his previous Mac Foster match, as a ranked tune-up for a higher ranked contender. Ron Lyle was 19–0 with 17 knockouts, and the tough ex-convict was in line for a title shot when he met Quarry in February. The 6'3" Lyle weighed 219 for the bout, Quarry 200. Despite trailing early on, Quarry took control of the fight in the middle rounds and thoroughly outboxed Lyle for a lopsided 12-round decision win in an action packed fight.

During this time, Quarry got a chance to show off his athletic ability. On the ABC television show The Superstars, he competed against other heavyweight boxers in a series of athletic contests. Winning that competition, he qualified for the Superstars final that year, and finished fourth to three NFL football players, an impressive showing. Noteworthy in those performances was his ability to hit a baseball. Two wins later, Don King brought Quarry in to meet hard-punching Earnie Shavers in December. Shavers was 46–2 with 44 KOs. In another bout filled with the same racial overtones as the second Ali bout, Quarry surprised Shavers. After receiving a few hard shots, he landed a big punch in the 1st round and followed that up to win a stunning first-round KO win. King reportedly left Shavers in the ring and tore up his contract to manage him. Heavyweight champion George Foreman was in attendance, and negotiations for a title bout were already in motion for mid-1974. After the Shavers bout, Foreman reportedly backed away from that proposed bout. He later claimed to have dodged Quarry, whom he never formally met in the ring.

Quarry later claimed to be 'locked out' of big-opportunity fights in 1974 by King, and found himself desperately looking for quality opponents that might get him a title shot. In June 1974, he agreed to rematch Joe Frazier. Quarry was the same size as at their first bout, but Frazier, now 212 pounds, was bigger. Quarry attempted to box Frazier this time, but due to the years of punishment, even in the recent wins against hard hitters Lyle and Shavers, he was more open to Frazier's shots and less mobile than he used to be. Straight away, a determined Frazier began to connect hard punches at the physically diminished Quarry who couldn't muster the movement to evade Frazier. Staggering him with a trademark left hook at the end of the first round, Frazier then began landing solidly with both hands to Quarry's head and body, beginning a sickening beat down. Quarry was already on wobbly legs when Frazier dropped with a hard left hook to the stomach just before the bell ending the 4th round. Quarry was visibly injured by the blow, but tried unsuccessfully to continue. The fight continued, with Frazier backing away from Quarry after opening up bad cuts over both eyes. Joe Louis, however, waved Frazier back on. After landing a few more clean head shots, Louis finally stopped the fight early in the 5th round, a one-sided thrashing. Louis never refereed another fight.

Quarry could still attract crowds. He had made millions in the ring without ever being champion at a time when few had ever made that much money in boxing. He continued his television acting work, and had by now briefly helped road-manage the rock band Three Dog Night.

After a win in February 1975, Quarry begged to be put in line for a fight with contender Ken Norton. When first choices Oscar Bonavena and Jimmy Young bowed out with injuries, Quarry was placed into the Norton bout on 18 days notice. Norton had been training for five months. The Norton fight was Quarry's 62nd pro fight. Norton, who was about the same age as Quarry, was 32–3. The 6'3" Norton weighed 218 for the bout, Quarry 207 with little training beforehand. Clancy was once again in Quarry's corner. The fight took place March 24, 1975. The fight was a war of hard punches, with Norton connecting well early against Quarry with shot reflexes, a sitting duck for Norton's attacks. He was cut badly in the 3rd round, and attacked Norton so he would have a chance to win before the fight was stopped. Norton survived a tough Quarry attack and continued his assault. The fight was stopped in the 5th round after Quarry came under a barrage of clean shots to the head.

== Retirement ==
Quarry retired for over two and a half years after the Norton fight. His career record was at 50–8–4 at this time, with 32 wins by KO. He had two losses each to Frazier and Ali plus one apiece to Norton, Chuvalo, Ellis and Eddie Machen to this point. He had been ranked as high as the No. 1 contender three times. At around this time, Quarry signed a contract with the ABC to be a boxing commentator.

In mid-1977, a return match was being put together which would put Quarry in against a ranked heavyweight. The ranked heavyweight would be Italian Lorenzo Zanon. The match was to be televised on ABC, where Quarry was contracted. But both fighters signed to have the bout televised on CBS. When Quarry, who often negotiated his own fight contracts, signed the bout to CBS, he lost his ABC contract.

The comeback match took place in November 1977, at Caesars Palace in Las Vegas. Quarry, weighing 209, looked slow and a shell of his former self, was clearly outboxed over seven rounds by Zanon. But Quarry caught him with a hard right in the 8th round, and won the fight by KO in the 9th. Despite winning, it was a poor performance, and Quarry retired again afterward, this time for almost six years.

During those years, Quarry was married and divorced twice. He also lost a great deal of his fortune in failed business investments. No longer doing television work, he decided to return to the ring. With the Cruiserweight division now created, Quarry returned in that weight class. When he returned in August 1983, he was 38 years old.

Quarry was already beginning to show the effects of his lengthy boxing career. A Sports Illustrated reporter was researching an article about health problems among retired boxers, especially among those who started as child boxers. The reporter met Quarry, and although he appeared to be in good health, Quarry's performance on several simple cognitive tests was shockingly poor.

He suffered from dementia pugilistica, atrophy of the brain from repeated blows to the head. A 1983 CT scan of Quarry's brain done for the article showed evidence of brain atrophy, including the characteristic cavum septi pellucidi found in many boxers with long careers.

Despite these developing facts, Quarry had two wins in 1983, but the fights accelerated his mental decline. He retired again and was inactive as a boxer from 1984 to 1992, but Quarry continued to decline physically and mentally. His entire boxing fortune completely gone by 1990, Quarry filed for Social Security at age 45. Denied a boxing license in many states because of his condition, Quarry found a loophole in Colorado which allowed him to schedule an October 30, 1992, bout with Ron Cramner, a cruiserweight 16 years Quarry's junior. At age 47 years and 6 months old, Quarry provided nothing more than a 6-round punching bag for the younger fighter, losing all six rounds and the decision.

== Last years ==
Within a few years of his final bout Quarry was unable to feed or dress himself and had to be cared for around the clock by relatives, mainly his brother James, who was the only one of the four brothers not to box professionally.

Jerry's brother, Mike, who had contended for the light-heavyweight championship, was himself beginning to show signs of dementia pugilistica in his later years, and died as a result on June 11, 2006. Another brother, Bobby, was diagnosed with Parkinson's disease.

Jerry Quarry was inducted into the World Boxing Hall of Fame in 1995.

== Death ==
Quarry was hospitalized with pneumonia on December 28, 1998, and then suffered cardiac arrest. He never regained consciousness and died on January 3, 1999, at the age of 53. His body was interred at Shafter Cemetery in Shafter, California. He left behind three children.

== Legacy ==
A foundation was established in his honor to battle boxing-related dementia, a condition that has afflicted many boxers and brought Quarry's life to an early end.

Quarry's overall professional record was 53–9–4 with 32 KOs. Frazier, in his autobiography, said of Quarry: "A very tough man. He could have been a world champion, but he cut too easily." Foreman similarly lauded Quarry.

== Championships and accomplishments ==
- Cauliflower Alley Club
  - Boxing Honoree (1993)

== Professional boxing record ==
66 fights	53 wins	9 losses
By knockout	32	6
By decision	21	3
Draws	4	

No.	Result	Record	Opponent	Type	Round, time	Date	Location	Notes
66	Loss	53–9–4	Ron Cranmer	UD	6	Oct 30, 1992	Holiday Inn Trade Center, Aurora, Colorado, U.S.	
65	Win	53–8–4	James Williams	MD	10	Nov 22, 1983	Kern County Fairgrounds, Bakersfield, California, U.S.	
64	Win	52–8–4	Lupe Guerra	TKO	1 (10), 0:32	Aug 31, 1983	Albuquerque Civic Auditorium, Albuquerque, New Mexico, U.S.	
63	Win	51–8–4	Lorenzo Zanon	TKO	9 (10), 2:34	Nov 5, 1977	Caesars Palace, Paradise, Nevada, U.S.	
62	Loss	50–8–4	Ken Norton	TKO	5 (12), 2:29	Mar 27, 1975	Madison Square Garden, New York City, New York, U.S.	For vacant NABF heavyweight title
61	Win	50–7–4	George Johnson	UD	10	Feb 25, 1975	Honolulu International Center, Honolulu, Hawaii, U.S.	
60	Loss	49–7–4	Joe Frazier	TKO	5 (10), 1:37	Jun 17, 1974	Madison Square Garden, New York City, New York, U.S.	
59	Win	49–6–4	Joe Alexander	KO	2 (10), 3:00	May 8, 1974	Nassau Coliseum, Uniondale, New York, U.S.	
58	Win	48–6–4	Earnie Shavers	TKO	1 (12), 2:21	Dec 14, 1973	Madison Square Garden, New York City, New York, U.S.	
57	Win	47–6–4	Tony Doyle	TKO	4 (10), 1:38	Sep 10, 1973	The Forum, Inglewood, California, U.S.	
56	Win	46–6–4	James J Woody	TKO	2 (10), 1:59	Aug 31, 1973	Convention Center, Las Vegas, Nevada, U.S.	
55	Win	45–6–4	Ron Lyle	UD	12	Feb 9, 1973	Madison Square Garden, New York City, New York, U.S.	
54	Win	44–6–4	Randy Neumann	RTD	7 (10)	Jan 5, 1973	Madison Square Garden, New York City, New York, U.S.	
53	Loss	43–6–4	Muhammad Ali	TKO	7 (12), 0:19	Jun 27, 1972	Convention Center, Las Vegas, Nevada, U.S.	For NABF heavyweight title
52	Win	43–5–4	Larry Middleton	PTS	10	May 9, 1972	Empire Pool, London, England	
51	Win	42–5–4	Eduardo Corletti	KO	1 (10), 2:58	Apr 17, 1972	The Forum, Inglewood, California, U.S.	
50	Win	41–5–4	Lou Bailey	UD	10	Dec 2, 1971	Veterans Memorial Auditorium, Des Moines, Iowa, U.S.	
49	Win	40–5–4	Jack Bodell	KO	1 (10), 1:04	Nov 16, 1971	Empire Pool, London, England	
48	Win	39–5–4	Tony Doyle	UD	10	Jul 24, 1971	Playboy Club Hotel, Lake Geneva, Wisconsin, U.S.	
47	Win	38–5–4	Dick Gosha	UD	10	Jun 18, 1971	Ocean Shores, Washington, U.S.	
46	Loss	37–5–4	Muhammad Ali	RTD	3 (15), 3:00	Oct 26, 1970	Municipal Auditorium, Atlanta, Georgia, U.S.	For Lineal Heavyweight Title
45	Win	37–4–4	Stamford Harris	TKO	6 (10), 1:14	Sep 8, 1970	Miami Beach Municipal Auditorium, Miami Beach, Florida, U.S.	
44	Win	36–4–4	Mac Foster	TKO	6 (10), 2:05	Jun 17, 1970	Madison Square Garden, New York City, New York, U.S.	
43	Win	35–4–4	George Johnson	UD	10	Mar 19, 1970	Olympic Auditorium, Los Angeles, California, U.S.	
42	Win	34–4–4	Rufus Brassell	KO	2 (10), 1:32	Mar 3, 1970	Miami Beach Convention Center, Miami Beach, Florida, U.S.	
41	Loss	33–4–4	George Chuvalo	KO	7 (10), 2:59	Dec 12, 1969	Madison Square Garden, New York City, New York, U.S.	
40	Win	33–3–4	Brian London	KO	2 (10), 2:30	Sep 3, 1969	Oakland Arena, Oakland, California, California, U.S.	
39	Win	32–3–4	Johnny Carroll	KO	1 (10), 2:43	Aug 11, 1969	Aldrich Arena, Saint Paul, Minnesota, U.S.	
38	Loss	31–3–4	Joe Frazier	RTD	7 (15), 3:00	Jun 23, 1969	Madison Square Garden, New York City, New York, U.S.	For NYSAC heavyweight title
37	Win	31–2–4	Buster Mathis	UD	12	Mar 24, 1969	Madison Square Garden, New York City, New York, U.S.	
36	Win	30–2–4	Aaron Eastling	KO	5 (10), 2:41	Jan 26, 1969	Memorial Auditorium, Canton, Ohio, U.S.	
35	Win	29–2–4	Charlie Reno	TKO	5 (10), 2:58	Jan 10, 1969	Seattle Center Coliseum, Seattle, Washington, U.S.	
34	Win	28–2–4	Willis Earls	UD	10	Nov 19, 1968	Freeman Coliseum, San Antonio, Texas, U.S.	
33	Win	27–2–4	Bob Mumford	TKO	5 (10), 1:15	Nov 11, 1968	Phoenix Forum, Phoenix, Arizona, U.S.	
32	Loss	26–2–4	Jimmy Ellis	MD	15	Apr 27, 1968	Coliseum Arena, Oakland, California, U.S.	For vacant WBA heavyweight title; WBA Heavyweight Title Elimination Tournament; Final
31	Win	26–1–4	Thad Spencer	TKO	12 (12), 2:57	Feb 3, 1968	Oakland Arena, Oakland, California, U.S.	WBA Heavyweight Title Elimination Tournament; Semi-finals; Quarry-Spencer, Bonavena-Ellis
30	Win	25–1–4	Floyd Patterson	MD	12	Oct 28, 1967	Olympic Auditorium, Los Angeles, California, U.S.	WBA Heavyweight Title Elimination Tournament; Quarter-finals; Quarry-Patterson, Martin-Ellis, Bonavena-Mildenberger, Terrell-Spencer
29	Win	24–1–4	Billy Daniels	KO	1 (10), 2:45	Sep 15, 1967	Sports Arena, Los Angeles, California, U.S.	
28	Draw	23–1–4	Floyd Patterson	MD	10	Jun 9, 1967	Memorial Coliseum, Los Angeles, California, U.S.	
27	Win	23–1–3	Alex Miteff	KO	3 (10), 2:18	Apr 27, 1967	Olympic Auditorium, Los Angeles, California, U.S.	
26	Win	22–1–3	Brian London	UD	10	Mar 9, 1967	Olympic Auditorium, Los Angeles, California, U.S.	
25	Win	21–1–3	Al Jones	KO	5 (10), 3:08	Jan 11, 1967	Civic Auditorium, San Francisco, California, U.S.	
24	Win	20–1–3	Joey Orbillo	UD	10	Dec 15, 1966	Olympic Auditorium, Los Angeles, California, U.S.	
23	Win	19–1–3	Leslie Borden	KO	5 (10), 2:18	Nov 28, 1966	Valley Music Theater, Los Angeles, California, U.S.	
22	Win	18–1–3	Bill Nielsen	UD	10	Oct 20, 1966	Olympic Auditorium, Los Angeles, California, U.S.	
21	Loss	17–1–3	Eddie Machen	UD	10	Jul 14, 1966	Olympic Auditorium, Los Angeles, California, U.S.	
20	Draw	17–0–3	Tony Alongi	PTS	10	May 27, 1966	Sports Arena, Los Angeles, California, U.S.	
19	Win	17–0–2	Al Jones	UD	10	May 2, 1966	Municipal Auditorium, Kansas City, Missouri, U.S.	
18	Win	16–0–2	George Johnson	TKO	2 (10), 2:40	Apr 7, 1966	Olympic Auditorium, Los Angeles, California, U.S.	
17	Draw	15–0–2	Tony Alongi	SD	10	Mar 4, 1966	Madison Square Garden, New York City, New York, U.S.	
16	Win	15–0–1	Prentice Snipes	TKO	5 (10), 2:20	Feb 17, 1966	Olympic Auditorium, Los Angeles, California, U.S.	
15	Win	14–0–1	Eddie Land	UD	8	Feb 3, 1966	Convention Center, Las Vegas, Nevada, U.S.	
14	Win	13–0–1	Roy Crear	TKO	3 (10)	Dec 23, 1965	Olympic Auditorium, Los Angeles, California, U.S.	
13	Draw	12–0–1	Tony Doyle	UD	10	Nov 11, 1965	Olympic Auditorium, Los Angeles, California, U.S.	
12	Win	12–0	Roy Crear	TKO	3 (10)	Nov 2, 1965	Municipal Auditorium, San Antonio, Texas, U.S.	
11	Win	11–0	Al Carter	TKO	6 (8), 1:21	Oct 28, 1965	Olympic Auditorium, Los Angeles, California, U.S.	
10	Win	10–0	Milton Manley	KO	1 (8), 0:30	Oct 18, 1965	Memorial Hall, Kansas City, Kansas, U.S.	
9	Win	9–0	Ray Junior Ellis	TKO	3 (6), 0:28	Sep 23, 1965	Olympic Auditorium, Los Angeles, California, U.S.	
8	Win	8–0	John Henry Jackson	UD	8	Aug 9, 1965	Memorial Hall, Kansas City, Kansas, U.S.	
7	Win	7–0	JP Spencer	TKO	4 (8), 0:34	Aug 2, 1965	Hacienda Hotel, Paradise, Nevada, U.S.	
6	Win	6–0	Ray Junior Ellis	UD	6	Jul 29, 1965	Olympic Auditorium, Los Angeles, California, U.S.	
5	Win	5–0	Willie Davis	KO	3 (6), 1:43	Jul 16, 1965	Olympic Auditorium, Los Angeles, California, U.S.	
4	Win	4–0	Dave Centi	UD	6	Jun 24, 1965	Olympic Auditorium, Los Angeles, California, U.S.	
3	Win	3–0	Lance Holmberg	UD	6	Jun 17, 1965	Olympic Auditorium, Los Angeles, California, U.S.	
2	Win	2–0	John Henry Jackson	KO	4 (6), 1:06	Jun 3, 1965	Olympic Auditorium, Los Angeles, California, U.S.	
1	Win	1–0	Gene Hamilton	PTS	4	May 7, 1965	Memorial Coliseum, Los Angeles, California, U.S.	
