= Mike Quarry =

American boxer (1971-2006)

Personal information
- Nationality: American
- Born: March 4, 1951
- Died: June 11, 2006 (aged 55) La Habra, California, US
- Height: 5 ft 11 in (180 cm)
- Weight: Light heavyweight

Boxing career
- Stance: Orthodox

Boxing record
- Total fights: 82
- Wins: 63
- Win by KO: 17
- Losses: 13
- Draws: 6

Michael Wayne Quarry (March 4, 1951 – June 11, 2006) was an American light-heavyweight boxer. He had a record of 63–13–6 with 17 knockouts. He defeated such fighters as Jimmy Dupree and Mike Rossman.

Mike Quarry was born in Bakersfield, California. He began boxing at the age of eight and obtained his license to fight as an amateur at 17. He tried to emulate his elder brother Jerry Quarry, a renowned heavyweight fighter. At one time, Michael said, "They might as well put on my epitaph: Here lies Jerry Quarry's little brother." After a win over title challenger Dupree, he had his one chance at a title shot in 1972, when he went up against Bob Foster for the World Boxing Council and World Boxing Association light-heavyweight crowns. Quarry lost by a fourth-round knockout.

Quarry died at age 55 in La Habra, California. His death was attributed to pugilistic dementia, which had also caused his brother Jerry's death. His grave is at Shafter Cemetery in Shafter, California.

== Professional boxing record ==
62 Wins (16 knockouts, 46 decisions), 13 Losses (5 knockouts, 8 decisions), 6 Draws
Result	Record	Opponent	Type	Round	Date	Location	Notes
Loss	64–13–5	(United States) Blufort Spencer	PTS	8	27/08/1982	(United States) Crystal City, Virginia, U.S.	
Loss	64–12–5	(Jamaica) Bunny Johnson	TKO	7	08/02/1981	Hordern Pavilion, Sydney, Australia	
Win	64–11–5	(United States) Alvin Dominey	PTS	10	30/08/1980	(United States) Hyatt, Incline Village, Nevada, U.S.	
Win	63–11–5	(United States) Pascual Ramirez	KO	8	23/11/1979	(United States) Hyatt, Lake Tahoe, Nevada, U.S.	
Loss	62–11–5	(United States) Tommy Evans	TKO	8	12/07/1978	(United States) Oakland, California, U.S.	
Draw	62–10–5	(United States) Kevin Smith	PTS	10	13/06/1978	(United States) Ice World, Totowa, New Jersey, U.S.	
Loss	62–10–4	(United States) Pete McIntyre	KO	5	10/03/1978	(United States) San Diego Coliseum, San Diego, California, U.S.	
Win	62–9–4	(Canada) Ron Wilson	SD	10	24/02/1978	(United States) San Diego Coliseum, San Diego, California, U.S.	
Draw	61–9–4	(United States) Ned Hallacy	PTS	10	24/01/1978	(United States) Wichita, Kansas, U.S.	
Loss	61–9–3	(United States) Mike Rossman	RTD	6	11/05/1977	(United States) Madison Square Garden, New York City, U.S.	
Win	61–8–3	(United States) Fred Wallace	PTS	10	23/03/1977	(United States) Anchorage, Alaska, U.S.	
Loss	60–8–3	(United States) Mike Rossman	MD	10	11/12/1976	(United States) The Aladdin, Las Vegas, Nevada, U.S.	
Win	60–7–3	(United States) Tom Bethea	UD	10	30/10/1976	(United States) The Aladdin, Las Vegas, Nevada, U.S.	
Win	59–7–3	(United States) Eddie Owens	UD	10	05/10/1976	(United States) Catholic Youth Center, Scranton, Pennsylvania, U.S.	
Win	58–7–3	(United States) Tony Greene	PTS	10	24/08/1976	(United States) Miami Beach, Florida, U.S.	
Win	57–7–3	(United States) Billy Freeman	KO	8	03/08/1976	(United States) Orlando, Florida, U.S.	
Win	56–7–3	(United States) Sylvester Wilder	TKO	5	22/06/1976	(United States) Orlando, Florida, U.S.	
Win	55–7–3	(United States) Chuck Warfield	PTS	10	08/06/1976	(United States) Orlando, Florida, U.S.	
Win	54–7–3	(United States) Nat Gates	SD	10	11/05/1976	(United States) Albuquerque Civic Auditorium, Albuquerque, New Mexico, U.S.	
Win	53–7–3	(United States) Mike Rossman	UD	10	30/09/1975	(United States) Nassau Coliseum, Uniondale, New York, U.S.	
Win	52–7–3	(Puerto Rico) Tony Santiago	SD	10	09/09/1975	(United States) Orlando, Florida, U.S.	
Loss	51–7–3	(United States) Pedro Soto	MD	10	25/07/1975	(United States) Tropicana Hotel & Casino, Las Vegas, Nevada, U.S.	
Win	51–6–3	(United States) Vernon McIntosh	TKO	6	08/07/1975	(United States) Miami Beach Convention Center, Miami Beach, Florida, U.S.	
Win	50–6–3	(United States) Vernon McIntosh	UD	10	03/06/1975	(United States) Orlando, Florida, U.S.	
Loss	49–6–3	(Mexico) Yaqui Lopez	UD	10	14/05/1975	(United States) Stockton, California, U.S.	
Win	49–5–3	(United States) Melvin Mott	UD	12	21/04/1975	(United States) Dallas Convention Center, Dallas, Texas, U.S.	Texas Light Heavyweight Title.
Win	48–5–3	(United States) Bobby Rascon	PTS	10	17/02/1975	(United States) Memorial Coliseum, Corpus Christi, Texas, U.S.	
Win	47–5–3	(Puerto Rico) José Roman	UD	10	03/01/1975	(United States) Fort Homer W. Hesterly Armory, Tampa, Florida, U.S.	
Win	46–5–3	(United States) Pedro Soto	UD	8	09/12/1974	(United States) Felt Forum, New York City, U.S.	
Win	45–5–3	(United States) Bobby Rascon	UD	10	26/11/1974	(United States) Albuquerque Civic Auditorium, Albuquerque, New Mexico, U.S.	
Win	44–5–3	(United States) Karl Zurheide	UD	10	21/05/1974	(United States) Jones Hall, Houston, Texas, U.S.	
Win	43–5–3	(Canada) Gary Summerhays	SD	12	10/04/1974	(United States) Orlando Sports Stadium, Orlando, Florida, U.S.	
Loss	42–5–3	(South Africa) Pierre Fourie	PTS	10	02/03/1974	Ellis Park Tennis Stadium, Johannesburg, South Africa	
Win	42–4–3	(United States) Bobby Rascon	UD	10	15/02/1974	(United States) Albuquerque Civic Auditorium, Albuquerque, New Mexico, U.S.	
Win	41–4–3	(United States) Brian Kelly Burden	UD	10	05/02/1974	(United States) Oklahoma City, U.S.	
Win	40–4–3	(United States) Karl Zurheide	UD	10	18/12/1973	(United States) Eagles Club, Milwaukee, Wisconsin, U.S.	
Loss	39–4–3	(United Kingdom) Chris Finnegan	PTS	10	13/11/1973	(United Kingdom) Empire Pool, London, England	
Loss	39–3–3	(United States) Andy Kendall	MD	10	03/10/1973	(United States) Orlando Sports Stadium, Orlando, Florida, U.S.	
Draw	39–2–3	(United States) Billy Wagner	PTS	12	21/07/1973	(United States) Felt Forum, New York City, U.S.	American Light Heavyweight Title.
Loss	39–2–2	(Denmark) Tom Bogs	UD	10	10/05/1973	K.B. Hallen, Copenhagen, Denmark	
Draw	39–1–2	(United States) Hal Carroll	PTS	10	23/04/1973	(United States) Felt Forum, New York City, U.S.	
Win	39–1–1	(United States) Walter White	UD	10	04/04/1973	(United States) Orlando, Florida, U.S.	
Win	38–1–1	(United States) Ray White	UD	12	29/01/1973	(United States) Anaheim Convention Center, Anaheim, California, U.S.	California Light Heavyweight Title.
Win	37–1–1	(United States) Paul Kasper	TKO	5	11/01/1973	(United States) Orlando, Florida, U.S.	Referee stopped the bout at 1:45 of the fifth round.
Draw	36–1–1	(United States) Frank "Bob" Evans	PTS	10	12/12/1972	(United States) Miami Beach Auditorium, Miami Beach, Florida, U.S.	
Loss	36–1	(United States) Bob Foster	KO	4	27/06/1972	(United States) Las Vegas Convention Center, Las Vegas, Nevada, U.S.	WBA/WBC Light Heavyweight Titles.
Win	36–0	(United States) Chuck Hamilton	TKO	8	03/04/1972	(United States) Inglewood Forum, Inglewood, California, U.S.	Referee stopped the bout at 1:15 of the eighth round..
Win	35–0	(United States) Tommy Hicks	UD	10	10/03/1972	(United States) Madison Square Garden, New York City, U.S.	
Win	34–0	(United States) Jimmy Dupree	TD	5	29/10/1971	(United States) Anaheim Convention Center, Anaheim, California, U.S.	NABF Light Heavyweight Title.
Win	33–0	(United States) Chuck Hamilton	UD	10	14/08/1971	(United States) Anaheim Convention Center, Anaheim, California, U.S.	
Win	32–0	(United States) Amado Vasquez	TKO	9	31/05/1971	(United States) Baseball park, National City, California, U.S.	Referee stopped the bout at 2:23 of the ninth round.
Win	31–0	(Canada) Ron Wilson	UD	10	15/05/1971	(United States) Valley Music Theater, Woodland Hills, California, U.S.	
Win	30–0	(United States) Hill Chambers	SD	10	28/04/1971	(United States) Silver Slipper, Las Vegas, Nevada, U.S.	
Win	29–0	(United States) Larry Cruz	KO	1	13/04/1971	(United States) Sahara Tahoe, Stateline, Nevada, U.S.	
Win	28–0	(Canada) Ron Wilson	MD	10	27/02/1971	(United States) Valley Music Theater, Woodland Hills, California, U.S.	
Win	27–0	(United States) Andy Kendall	MD	10	23/01/1971	(United States) Valley Music Theater, Woodland Hills, California, U.S.	
Win	26–0	(United States) Amado Vasquez	UD	10	19/12/1970	(United States) Valley Music Theater, Woodland Hills, California, U.S.	
Win	24–0	(Mexico) Enrique Villareal	TKO	9	14/11/1970	(United States) Valley Music Theater, Woodland Hills, California, U.S.	Referee stopped the bout at 1:36 of the ninth round.
Win	23–0	(Puerto Rico) Ray Ayala	MD	10	17/06/1970	(United States) Madison Square Garden, New York City, U.S.	
Win	22–0	(Wales) Eddie Avoth	UD	10	06/06/1970	(United States) Valley Music Theater, Woodland Hills, California, U.S.	
Win	21–0	(United States) Jesse Jerome Hill	PTS	10	25/04/1970	(United States) Santa Barbara, California, U.S.	
Win	20–0	(United States) Filifili Alaiasa	PTS	8	24/03/1970	(United States) Honolulu, Hawaii, U.S.	
Win	19–0	(United States) George Holden	UD	8	03/03/1970	(United States) Miami Beach Auditorium, Miami Beach, Florida, U.S.	
Win	18–0	(United States) Bob Matthews	PTS	6	19/02/1970	(United States) Olympic Auditorium, Los Angeles, California, U.S.	
Win	17–0	(United States) George Thomas	UD	8	26/01/1970	(United States) Beverly Hilton Hotel, Los Angeles, California, U.S.	
Win	16–0	(Puerto Rico) Ruben Figueroa	SD	8	31/10/1969	(United States) Madison Square Garden, New York City, U.S.	
Win	15–0	(United States) Teddy Murray	UD	8	21/10/1969	(United States) Orlando Sports Stadium, Orlando, Florida, U.S.	
Win	14–0	(United States) George Holden	TKO	7	14/10/1969	(United States) Orlando, Florida, U.S.	
Win	13–0	(United States) Vidal Flores	PTS	8	09/10/1969	(United States) La Crosse, Wisconsin, U.S.	
Win	12–0	(United States) Dean Whitlock	TKO	6	06/10/1969	(United States) Minneapolis Auditorium, Minneapolis, Minnesota, U.S.	
Win	11–0	(United States) Jeff Wall	KO	3	18/09/1969	(United States) Seattle Center Coliseum, Seattle, Washington, U.S.	
Win	10–0	(United States) Ken Watkins	UD	6	09/09/1969	(United States) Valley Music Theater, Woodland Hills, California, U.S.	
Win	9–0	(United States) George Thomas	PTS	8	03/09/1969	(United States) Oakland Arena, Oakland, California, U.S.	
Win	8–0	(United States) Ken Watkins	PTS	6	15/08/1969	(United States) Arena, San Bernardino, California, U.S.	
Win	7–0	Larry Gregg	KO	2	11/08/1969	(United States) Aldrich Arena, Saint Paul, Minnesota, U.S.	
Win	6–0	(Puerto Rico) Ruben Figueroa	MD	6	23/06/1969	(United States) Madison Square Garden, New York City, U.S.	
Win	5–0	(United States) Ernie Gipson	TKO	5	27/05/1969	(United States) Oakland Auditorium, Oakland, California, U.S.	
Win	4–0	(United States) LaVerne Williams	KO	3	19/05/1969	(United States) San Diego Sports Arena, San Diego, California, U.S.	
Win	3–0	(United States) Bob Matthews	PTS	6	13/05/1969	(United States) Valley Music Theater, Woodland Hills, California, U.S.	
Win	2–0	(United States) Butch McCarthy	KO	1	29/04/1969	(United States) Valley Music Theater, Woodland Hills, California, U.S.	McCarthy knocked out at 1:53 of the first round.
Win	1–0	(United States) James Dick	UD	5	18/04/1969	(United States) Inglewood Forum, Inglewood, California, U.S.	
