= Ray White (boxer) =

American boxer

Personal information
- Nickname: Windmill
- Nationality: American
- Born: August 5, 1938 (age 88) Monroe, Louisiana, U.S.
- Height: 6’ 4”
- Weight: Heavyweight

Boxing career
- Stance: Orthodox

Boxing record
- Total fights: 59
- Wins: 40
- Win by KO: 10
- Losses: 14
- Draws: 5

Ray "Windmill" White (born August 5, 1938) is an American former professional boxer best known for his unorthodox punches. He fought boxers like Jimmy Dupree, Jesse Burnett and Mike Quarry.

== History ==
White fought out of Ventura, California in the 1960s and 1970s. He was a popular draw in the Los Angeles area, fighting multiple times at the Olympic Auditorium and winning the California State Light Heavyweight title. The tall and lanky White, with his unusual reach advantage, invented several unorthodox punches including the behind the back punch. His popularity led to appearances on national television shows including The Tonight Show Starring Johnny Carson and The Merv Griffin Show. He retired in 1974 and despite a record of 41-14-5 and wins over name contenders of the era, he was never offered a shot at a world title.

White currently resides in Ventura County, California and is an instructor at The Ventura KO Academy, where he helps in the training of amateur and professional fighters. In the summer of 2011, White will be inducted into California Boxing Hall of Fame as well as inducted to the Ventura County Hall of Fame. He was ranked the 7th most awkward fighter of all time in The Ultimate Boxing Book of Lists by Bert Randolph Sugar and Teddy Atlas.

== Professional boxing record ==
40 Wins (10 knockouts, 30 decisions), 14 Losses (3 knockouts, 11 decisions), 5 Draws Archived May 2, 2015, at the Wayback Machine
Result	Record	Opponent	Type	Round	Date	Location	Notes
Win	--	(United States) Randy Miller	TKO	9	11/06/1974	(United States) Sam Houston Coliseum, Houston, U.S.	
Win	10-8-4	(United States) Eddie Bailey	PTS	10	29/04/1974	(United States) Philadelphia Spectrum, Philadelphia, U.S.	
Loss	7-0-1	(United States) Jesse Burnett	KO	8	15/03/1974	(United States) San Diego Coliseum, San Diego, U.S.	
Draw	10-8-3	(United States) Eddie Bailey	PTS	8	18/02/1974	(United States) Philadelphia Spectrum, Philadelphia, U.S.	
Win	0-6	(United States) Faustino Perez	TKO	7	22/01/1974	(United States) El Paso County Coliseum, El Paso, Texas, U.S.	
Win	3-4	(United States) Charles Anderson Atlas	PTS	10	10/12/1973	(United States) Monroe, Louisiana, U.S.	
Win	41-25-1	(United States) Bobby Rascon	PTS	10	10/11/1973	(United States) Tucson Convention Center, Tucson, Arizona, U.S.	
Draw	22-4-3	(United States) Hildo Silva	PTS	8	17/08/1973	(United States) San Diego Coliseum, San Diego, U.S.	
Win	10-3	(Samoa) Koroseta Kid	PTS	10	03/07/1973	(United States) Honolulu Civic Auditorium, Honolulu, U.S.	
Win	40-24-1	(United States) Bobby Rascon	UD	10	01/06/1973	(United States) Tucson Convention Center, Tucson, Arizona, U.S.	
Win	16-14	(United States) Chuck Hamilton	TKO	8	10/03/1973	(United States) Santa Rosa, California, U.S.	
Win	19-18-2	(Cuba) Lino Rendon	PTS	10	20/02/1973	(United States) Bakersfield Civic Auditorium, Bakersfield, California, U.S.	
Loss	36-1-1	(United States) Mike Quarry	UD	12	29/01/1973	(United States) Anaheim Convention Center, Anaheim, California, U.S.	California Light Heavyweight Title.
Win	39-42-7	(United States) Charley Austin	UD	10	18/12/1972	(United States) Phoenix Riverside Ballroom, Phoenix, Arizona, U.S.	
Win	3-7	(United States) Bob Hazelton	TKO	8	12/12/1972	(United States) San Diego, U.S.	
Win	17-6-1	(United States) Orlando de la Fuentes	UD	12	20/11/1972	(United States) Valley Music Theater, Woodland Hills, California, U.S.	
Win	16-42-11	(United States) Frank Niblett	UD	10	06/11/1972	(United States) Phoenix Riverside Ballroom, Phoenix, Arizona, U.S.	
Draw	43-7-4	(Mexico) Rafael Gutierrez	PTS	12	02/10/1972	(United States) Valley Music Theater, Woodland Hills, California, U.S.	California Light Heavyweight Title.
Loss	19-7	(United States) Johnny Griffin	UD	10	26/04/1972	(United States) Cleveland Arena, Cleveland, Ohio, U.S.	
Win	8-16-1	(United States) Hill Chambers	UD	10	08/04/1972	(United States) Tucson Convention Center, Tucson, Arizona, U.S.	
Win	12-11-3	(United States) "Irish" Terry Lee	SD	12	26/02/1972	(United States) Long Beach Auditorium, Long Beach, California, U.S.	California Light Heavyweight Title.
Win	11-10-3	(United States) "Irish" Terry Lee	SD	12	04/12/1971	(United States) Long Beach Auditorium, Long Beach, California, U.S.	California Light Heavyweight Title.
Win	5-14-1	(United States) Hill Chambers	UD	10	19/11/1971	(United States) Long Beach Auditorium, Long Beach, California, U.S.	
Win	14-7-3	(United States) Amado Vasquez	TKO	10	24/09/1971	(United States) Anaheim Convention Center, Anaheim, California, U.S.	California Light Heavyweight Title.
Loss	31-6-2	(United States) Jimmy "The Cat" Dupree	UD	12	03/07/1971	(United States) Santa Monica Civic Auditorium, Santa Monica, California, U.S.	NABF Light Heavyweight Title.
Loss	3-1	(United States) Lonnie Bennett	SD	10	19/06/1971	(United States) Ventura County Fairgrounds, Ventura, California, U.S.	
Win	13-9-1	(United States) Steve Grant	PTS	10	05/06/1971	(United States) Santa Monica Civic Auditorium, Santa Monica, California, U.S.	
Win	37-14-5	(United States) Roger Rouse	UD	10	22/05/1971	(United States) Santa Monica Civic Auditorium, Santa Monica, California, U.S.	
Win	15-9	(United States) Chuck Hamilton	UD	12	17/04/1971	(United States) Valley Music Theater, Woodland Hills, California, U.S.	California Light Heavyweight Title.
Win	15-8	(United States) Chuck Hamilton	TKO	2	20/03/1971	(United States) Valley Music Theater, Woodland Hills, California, U.S.	California Light Heavyweight Title. Referee stopped the bout at 0:28 of the second round.
Win	11-8-3	(United States) Terry Lee	UD	10	20/02/1971	(United States) Valley Music Theater, Woodland Hills, California, U.S.	
Win	3-6-1	(United States) "Big" Robie Harris	SD	10	09/01/1971	(United States) Valley Music Theater, Woodland Hills, California, U.S.	
Draw	13-8	(United States) Steve Grant	PTS	8	21/11/1970	(United States) Valley Music Theater, Woodland Hills, California, U.S.	
Loss	13-2	(United States) Steve Carter	UD	10	10/08/1970	(United States) Oakland Auditorium, Oakland, California, U.S.	
Loss	32-9-6	(United States) Hank Casey	PTS	10	29/06/1970	(United States) Oakland Auditorium, Oakland, California, U.S.	
Win	10-4	(United States) AJ Staples	UD	10	01/05/1970	(United States) Kiel Auditorium, Saint Louis, Missouri, U.S.	
Loss	8-10-1	(United States) Willis Earls	PTS	10	30/03/1970	(United States) Austin, Texas, U.S.	
Win	15-35-11	(United States) Frank Niblett	UD	10	27/10/1969	(United States) Valley Music Theater, Woodland Hills, California, U.S.	
Win	7-11	(United States) Rocky Martin	TKO	8	26/08/1969	(United States) Valley Music Theater, Woodland Hills, California, U.S.	
Win	12-7	(United States) Steve Grant	SD	10	01/07/1969	(United States) Valley Music Theater, Woodland Hills, California, U.S.	
Win	19-16-2	(United States) Lino Rendon	PTS	10	04/12/1968	(United States) Ventura County Fairgrounds, Ventura, California, U.S.	
Win	20-27-2	(United States) Sonny Moore	UD	10	27/08/1968	(United States) San Antonio Municipal Auditorium, San Antonio, U.S.	
Win	10-4-2	(United States) Gary Bates	PTS	6	17/07/1968	(United States) Silver Slipper, Las Vegas, Nevada, U.S.	
Win	7-7	(United States) Dick Gosha	PTS	10	06/07/1968	(United States) Ventura County Fairgrounds, Ventura, California, U.S.	
Loss	13-16-4	(United States) George Johnson	UD	10	28/11/1967	(United States) Community Concourse, San Diego, U.S.	
Loss	4-5-2	(United States) Sam Wyatt	PTS	6	09/10/1967	(United States) Long Beach Municipal Auditorium, Long Beach, California, U.S.	
Win	2-3	(United States) Mark White	KO	2	27/07/1967	(United States) Olympic Auditorium, Los Angeles, U.S.	
Draw	2-0	(United States) Roy Wallace	PTS	6	04/05/1967	(United States) Olympic Auditorium, Los Angeles, U.S.	
Win	2-1	(United States) Mark White	UD	6	06/04/1967	(United States) Olympic Auditorium, Los Angeles, U.S.	
Loss	1-1	(United States) Mark White	PTS	4	23/03/1967	(United States) Olympic Auditorium, Los Angeles, U.S.	
Win	2-3	(United States) Gene Turner	PTS	4	16/02/1967	(United States) Olympic Auditorium, Los Angeles, U.S.	
Win	1-5	(United States) Frank Davis	PTS	4	02/02/1967	(United States) Olympic Auditorium, Los Angeles, U.S.	
Win	2-3	(United States) Buddy Levine	TKO	4	03/11/1966	(United States) Seattle Center Coliseum, Seattle, U.S.	
Win	--	Lavern Hardison	KO	4	09/05/1966	(United States) Hacienda Hotel, Las Vegas, Nevada, U.S.	
Win	1-1	(United States) Scott Wisooker	PTS	5	28/03/1966	(United States) Las Vegas, Nevada, U.S.	
Loss	18-4-2	(United States) Archie Ray	KO	3	15/01/1966	(United States) Phoenix, Arizona, U.S.	
Loss	1-5	(United States) Aaron Peralta	PTS	4	30/03/1962	(United States) Los Angeles Sports Arena, Los Angeles, U.S.	
Win	6-3-1	(United States) Dewayne Garris	PTS	4	10/07/1959	(United States) Monroe, Louisiana, U.S.	
Loss	--	(United States) Bill DeSoto	TKO	2	12/12/1958	(United States) Monroe, Louisiana, U.S.	
