= George Johnson (boxer) =

American boxer, born 1941

Personal information
- Nickname: Scrap Iron
- Nationality: American
- Born: December 15, 1938 Oklahoma City, Oklahoma, U.S.
- Died: April 9, 2016 (aged 77)
- Height: 5 ft 9 in (175 cm)
- Weight: 235 (1972)

Boxing career
- Stance: Orthodox

Boxing record
- Total fights: 54
- Wins: 22
- Win by KO: 11
- Losses: 27
- Draws: 5

George Raft "Scrap Iron" Johnson (December 15, 1938 – April 9, 2016) was an American heavyweight boxer whose career spanned the 1950s, 1960s and 1970s. Johnson fought many of the top fighters of his era, including George Foreman, Joe Frazier, Sonny Liston, Ron Lyle, Duane Bobick, Joe Bugner, Jerry Quarry, and Eddie Machen.

Whilst a journeyman fighter he was nonetheless notorious for being extremely durable. He could take vast amounts of punishment. George Foreman said he had the best chin of all his opponents. He retired in 1975 with a record of 22–27–5. He was inducted into the California Boxing Hall of Fame in 2005.

Johnson was nicknamed "Scrap" by girls in his neighborhood in Oklahoma City when he was about seven years old, because he used a wheelbarrow to salvage machinery parts to earn money. By high school, his American football teammates tacked on the "iron."

In 1969, after putting together a string of wins, Johnson was defeated by Sonny Liston in Las Vegas by a seventh round TKO. Johnson had been scheduled to get married at midnight after the fight, but pushed off the wedding to the next day to recover. Johnson later claimed "Liston hit me so hard, I married the wrong woman."

== Professional boxing record ==
22 Wins (11 knockouts, 11 decisions), 27 Losses (12 knockouts, 15 decisions), 5 Draws
Result	Record	Opponent	Type	Round	Date	Location	Notes
Loss	31–0	(United States) Duane Bobick	RTD	4	13 Nov 1975	(United States) Met Center, Bloomington, Minnesota	
Draw	14–1	(United States) Scott LeDoux	PTS	10	14 Aug 1975	(United States) Saint Paul Civic Center, Saint Paul, Minnesota	SD for LeDoux overturned due to crowd response.
Loss	12–0	(United States) Leroy Jones	PTS	10	18 Mar 1975	(United States) Honolulu, Hawaii	
Loss	49–7–4	(United States) Jerry Quarry	UD	10	25 Feb 1975	(United States) Hawaii International Center, Honolulu, Hawaii	
Loss	10–0	(United States) Johnny Boudreaux	PTS	10	16 Sep 1974	(United States) Houston, Texas	
Loss	29–2	(United States) Boone Kirkman	UD	10	23 Oct 1973	(United States) Seattle Center Arena, Seattle, Washington	
Win	4–6–1	(United States) Joe Tiger Harris	TKO	3	2 Jul 1973	(United States) Las Vegas, Nevada	
Win	—	(United States) John Robinson	KO	2	16 May 1973	(United States) Las Vegas, Nevada	
Win	5–17–1	(United States) Terry Sorrell	KO	5	25 Apr 1973	(United States) Las Vegas, Nevada	Sorrell knocked out at 1:41 of the fifth round.
Win	1–3	(United States) Dave Sherman	TKO	2	11 Apr 1973	(United States) Las Vegas, Nevada	
Loss	12–0	(United States) Ron Lyle	KO	3	25 Mar 1972	(United States) Denver, Colorado	Johnson knocked out at 0:31 of the third round.
Loss	26–9–6	(Germany) Juergen Blin	TKO	2	1 Oct 1971	Hamburg, Germany	
Win	7–8	(United States) MacArthur Swindell	PTS	10	30 Jun 1971	(United States) Silver Slipper, Paradise, Nevada	
Loss	28–2	(Australia) Joe Bugner	PTS	10	3 Nov 1970	(United Kingdom) Royal Albert Hall, London, England	
Loss	19–0	(United States) George Foreman	TKO	7	16 May 1970	(United States) Great Western Forum, Inglewood, California	Referee stopped the bout at 1:41 of the seventh round.
Loss	34–4–4	(United States) Jerry Quarry	UD	10	19 Mar 1970	(United States) Olympic Auditorium, Los Angeles, California	
Loss	47–3	(United States) Sonny Liston	TKO	7	19 May 1969	(United States) Las Vegas Convention Center, Winchester, Nevada	Referee stopped the bout at 2:55 of the seventh round.
Win	13–5–1	(Canada) Bob Felstein	PTS	10	18 Feb 1969	(United States) Olympic Auditorium, Los Angeles, California	
Win	3–13–1	(United States) Alvin Tiger	TKO	6	2 Oct 1968	(United States) Silver Slipper, Paradise, Nevada	
Win	5–6–1	(United States) Roy Wallace	UD	10	22 Aug 1968	(United States) Olympic Auditorium, Los Angeles, California	
Win	8–5–1	(United States) Ray White	UD	10	28 Nov 1967	(United States) Community Concourse, San Diego, California	
Win	9–4–1	(United States) Earl Averette	UD	10	26 Oct 1967	(United States) Olympic Auditorium, Los Angeles, California	
Win	57–8–3	(Italy) Santo Amonti	TKO	10	2 Aug 1967	(United States) Los Angeles Sports Arena, Los Angeles, California	Referee stopped the bout at 1:19 of the tenth round.
Loss	15–0	(United States) Joe Frazier	UD	10	4 May 1967	(United States) Olympic Auditorium, Los Angeles, California	
Win	25–3–4	(United States) Otha Brown	TKO	7	15 Dec 1966	(United States) Olympic Auditorium, Los Angeles, California	Referee stopped the bout at 0:59 of the seventh round.
Loss	49–8–3	(United States) Eddie Machen	UD	10	29 Sep 1966	(United States) Olympic Auditorium, Los Angeles, California	
Win	6–6	(Germany) Emil Umek	UD	10	26 Jul 1966	(United States) Stockyards Coliseum, Oklahoma City, Oklahoma	
Loss	15–0–2	(United States) Jerry Quarry	TKO	2	7 Apr 1966	(United States) Olympic Auditorium, Los Angeles, California	Referee stopped the bout at 2:40 of the second round.
Draw	11–8–1	(United States) Chuck Leslie	PTS	10	6 Jan 1966	(United States) Olympic Auditorium, Los Angeles, California	
Draw	5–5–1	(Mexico) Manuel Ramos	PTS	10	4 Nov 1965	(United States) Olympic Auditorium, Los Angeles, California	
Win	9–2–1	(United States) Jimmy Harryman	TKO	10	21 Oct 1965	(United States) Olympic Auditorium, Los Angeles, California	Referee stopped the bout at 1:18 of the tenth round.
Loss	12–1–2	(United States) Elmer Rush	UD	10	27 Sep 1965	(United States) The Hacienda, Paradise, Nevada	
Loss	7–2–1	(United States) Henry Clark	PTS	10	23 Sep 1965	(United States) Kezar Pavilion, San Francisco, California	1-6.
Loss	32–7–1	(United States) Amos Lincoln	KO	5	5 Aug 1965	(United States) Olympic Auditorium, Los Angeles, California	Johnson knocked out at 2:27 of the fifth round.
Win	8–3–1	(United States) Roy Rogers	TKO	7	22 Jun 1965	(United States) Lubbock, Texas	Referee stopped the bout at 2:30 of the seventh round.
Loss	7–1–1	(United States) Roy "Cowboy" Rogers	UD	10	9 Nov 1964	(United States) Dallas Sportatorium, Dallas, Texas	
Loss	19–2	(United States) Thad Spencer	KO	4	4 Aug 1964	(United States) Castaways Hotel and Casino, Las Vegas, Nevada	
Loss	17–17–2	(United States) Sonny "Policeman" Moore	PTS	10	25 May 1964	(United States) Dallas Sportatorium, Dallas, Texas	
Win	17–16–2	(United States) Sonny Moore	SD	10	14 Apr 1964	(United States) Lindsayland Auditorium, Oklahoma City, Oklahoma	
Draw	5–4–1	(United States) John L. Davey	PTS	10	7 Apr 1964	(United States) Stockyards Coliseum, Oklahoma City, Oklahoma	
Win	0–2	(United States) Roy Crear	SD	10	17 Mar 1964	(United States) Lindsayland Auditorium, Oklahoma City, Oklahoma	
Win	0–8	(United States) Leo Bennett	TKO	2	11 Feb 1964	(United States) Stockyards Coliseum, Oklahoma City, Oklahoma	
Draw	35–10–1	(United States) Buddy Turman	PTS	10	5 Nov 1962	(United States) Tyler, Texas	
Loss	14–14–1	(United States) Ernie Cab	KO	6	25 Apr 1961	(United States) City Auditorium, Houston, Texas	
Loss	11–0	(United States) Tod Herring	KO	6	7 Mar 1961	(United States) Houston, Texas	
Loss	34–10–1	(United States) Donnie Fleeman	TKO	7	28 Nov 1960	(United States) Dallas Memorial Auditorium, Dallas, Texas	
Win	0–3	(United States) Leo "Zorro" Bennett	KO	1	15 Sep 1960	(United States) Oklahoma City Municipal Auditorium, Oklahoma City, Oklahoma	Bennett knocked out at 2:45 of the first round.
Loss	13–4–1	(United States) Floyd Joyner	PTS	6	31 Aug 1960	(United States) Albuquerque Civic Auditorium, Albuquerque, New Mexico	
Win	0–1	(United States) Benny Lee Bowser	PTS	6	2 Aug 1960	(United States) Port Arthur, Texas	
Win	—	Donny Blue	PTS	6	13 Jun 1960	(United States) Wichita, Kansas	
Loss	3–1	(United States) Wayne Heath	PTS	6	12 Apr 1960	(United States) Lindsayland Auditorium, Oklahoma City, Oklahoma	
Loss	1–0	(United States) Wayne Heath	PTS	4	24 Nov 1959	(United States) Lindsayland Auditorium, Oklahoma City, Oklahoma	
Win	2–7	(United States) Ted Hester	PTS	4	10 Nov 1959	(United States) Lindsayland Auditorium, Oklahoma City, Oklahoma	
Loss	11–16–2	(United States) Johnny "J.C." Carroll	TKO	2	9 Jun 1958	(United States) Tucson Sports Center, Tucson, Arizona	
