= Vicente Rondón =

Venezuelan boxer

Personal information
- Nicknames: El Muchachote de Barlovento ("The Windward Boy")
- Born: Vicente Paul Rondón; July 29, 1938 San José de Río Chico, Venezuela
- Died: December 28, 1992 (aged 54) Caracas, Venezuela
- Height: 6 ft 1 in (185 cm)
- Weight: Light heavyweight

Boxing career
- Reach: 77 in (196 cm)
- Stance: Orthodox

Boxing record
- Total fights: 59
- Wins: 40
- Win by KO: 23
- Losses: 16
- Draws: 1
- No contests: 2

Vicente Paúl Rondón (July 29, 1938 – December 28, 1992) was a Venezuelan professional boxer who competed from 1965 to 1974, holding the WBA light heavyweight title from 1971 to 1972.

== Personal background ==
Rondón was born into extreme poverty in San José de Río Chico, Miranda, Venezuela, and decided to escape his poor surroundings by enlisting in the Venezuelan military at an early age.

== Professional career ==
When Rondón turned professional, his year of birth was listed as 1944; in fact it was 1938. Rondón began fighting as a middleweight and made a name for himself with upset victories over former world welterweight champion Luis Rodríguez and middleweight contender Bennie Briscoe. However, Rondon was growing and quickly established himself as a top rated light heavyweight with impressive wins over Roger Rouse, Eddie Talhami, and Allen Thomas. World Light-heavyweight Champion Bob Foster did not seem eager to fight the #2 ranked Rondón or the #1 rated Jimmy Dupree at the time. In 1971, the WBA stripped Foster of his title and matched Rondón and Dupree.

Rondón and Dupree faced each other on February 27, 1971, at Nuevo Circo in Caracas. In an exciting slugfest, Rondón climbed off the canvas in the second round to stop the favored Dupree at 2:58 of the 6th round. At the time of the stoppage, referee Zack Clayton had the fight scored even at 47–47. Judge Dimas Hernandez also scored the bout 47–47, and judge Gustavo Vargas favored Rondón, 48–47. Following the fight, a controversy broke out with Dupree claiming he was drugged. The United Press International published a story of the claim. In the UPI article, Charliese Smith, a registered nurse and friend of Dupree said, "I believe Jimmy was drugged. I saw Jimmy after the fight and he was very very weak. His vision was blurry and he couldn't even see the other side of the room." She went on to say, "I know of muscle relaxants that can be administered in food and I'm convinced that Jimmy was given something." Regardless of the charges, the World Boxing Association recognized Rondón as world champion, while The Ring magazine viewed Bob Foster as the legitimate light-heavyweight king.

1971 was an outstanding year for Rondón with a number of title defenses. He became the first and only fighter to stop Gomeo Brennan. Many experts felt that Rondón could and would defeat Bob Foster, with a unification fight finally arranged for April 7, 1972. On fight night at Miami Beach, Florida, Rondón was stopped by Foster in two rounds. A venture into the heavyweight ranks proved just as bad, as he was beaten by Ron Lyle by TKO, Earnie Shavers by UD, and José Urtain on points. Interestingly for a former light heavyweight, he was one of the few fighters to go the distance with famed heavyweight power-puncher Shavers, being the second of just six fighters to lose to Shavers by decision, though he had earlier been stopped by the similarly powerful hitter Lyle. Rondón did better in 1973 as he started to trim down in weight. He scored an impressive 10-round decision over undefeated prospect Oliver Wright on Miami Beach. Shortly after, he stopped heavyweight Mike "Jim" Boswell in four rounds.

At the same time, Rondón was plagued by troubles outside of the ring. He was developing a drinking problem and had very poor spending habits. An attempt to regain the light-heavyweight title saw him drop a decision to number 1-rated Len Hutchins; Rondón later suffered a 9th-round technical knockout to John Conteh. In 1974, Rondón, weighing 188 pounds, went back to the heavyweight division, where he would be largely unsuccessful. He was unable to get off the stool for round three in his fight with Rodney Bobick at Miami Beach, Florida. In his next fight, he was knocked out in two rounds by former world heavyweight title contender José Roman. This proved to be the last bout in his career.

== Retirement and life after boxing ==
Shortly after the Roman fight, Rondón faced a litany of problems that forced him into retirement. He was confined to a mental hospital, and later arrested on charges of robbing a store for $150. Rondon served a prison sentence, and there are unconfirmed reports that he boxed some exhibitions or possibly a professional match while incarcerated. Rondón was released from prison a physical wreck. Rondón, a boxing idol of his country, died in poverty in Santa Ana de Carapita, a slum of Caracas. Rondón had been living with his elderly mother at the time. He was 54 when he died.

== Professional boxing record ==
| 59 fights | 40 wins | 16 losses |
|---|---|---|
| By knockout | 23 | 7 |
| By decision | 17 | 9 |
| Draws | 1 | |
| No contests | 2 | |

| No. | Result | Record | Opponent | Type | Round, time | Date | Location | Notes |
|---|---|---|---|---|---|---|---|---|
| 59 | Loss | 40–16–1 (2) | José Roman | TKO | 2 (10) | 1974-06-06 | Curtis Hixon Hall, Tampa, Florida, U.S. | |
| 58 | Loss | 40–15–1 (2) | Rodney Bobick | RTD | 2 (10) | 1974-02-19 | Auditorium, Miami Beach, Florida, U.S. | |
| 57 | Loss | 40–14–1 (2) | Bobby Lloyd | UD | 10 (10) | 1973-12-08 | Birdland Arena, Nassau, Bahamas | |
| 56 | Loss | 40–13–1 (2) | Rudiger Schmidtke | PTS | 10 (10) | 1973-11-17 | Festhalle, Frankfurt, Germany | |
| 55 | Loss | 40–12–1 (2) | John Conteh | TKO | 9 (10) | 1973-09-10 | Empire Pool, Wembley, England, U.K. | |
| 54 | Win | 40–11–1 (2) | Mike Boswell | TKO | 4 (10) | 1973-08-24 | Convention Exposition Center, Indianapolis, Indiana, U.S. | |
| 53 | Win | 39–11–1 (2) | Boston Blackie | TKO | 7 (10) | 1973-07-03 | A.F. Adderley Auditorium, Nassau, Bahamas | |
| 52 | Loss | 38–11–1 (2) | Tom Bogs | UD | 10 (10) | 1973-06-14 | K.B. Hallen, Copenhagen, Denmark | |
| 51 | Loss | 38–10–1 (2) | Len Hutchins | UD | 10 (10) | 1973-05-19 | Olympia Stadium, Detroit, Michigan, U.S. | |
| 50 | Win | 38–9–1 (2) | Oliver Wright | UD | 10 (10) | 1973-04-03 | Auditorium, Miami Beach, Florida, U.S. | |
| 49 | Win | 37–9–1 (2) | Larry Beilfuss | PTS | 10 (10) | 1973-02-15 | Roberto Clemente Coliseum, San Juan, Puerto Rico | |
| 48 | Loss | 36–9–1 (2) | José Manuel Urtain | PTS | 10 (10) | 1972-12-01 | Pabellón Polideportivo, Madrid, Spain | |
| 47 | Loss | 36–8–1 (2) | Earnie Shavers | UD | 10 (10) | 1972-08-26 | Memorial Auditorium, Canton, Ohio, U.S. | |
| 46 | Loss | 36–7–1 (2) | Ron Lyle | TKO | 2 (10) | 1972-07-10 | Mile High Stadium, Denver, Colorado, U.S. | |
| 45 | Loss | 36–6–1 (2) | Bob Foster | TKO | 2 (15) | 1972-04-07 | Auditorium, Miami Beach, Florida, U.S. | Lost WBA light-heavyweight title; For WBC & The Ring light-heavyweight titles |
| 44 | Win | 36–5–1 (2) | Doyle Baird | TKO | 8 (15) | 1971-12-15 | Arena, Cleveland, Ohio, U.S. | Retained WBA light-heavyweight title |
| 43 | Win | 35–5–1 (2) | Gomeo Brennan | TKO | 13 (15) | 1971-10-26 | Auditorium, Miami Beach, Florida, U.S. | Retained WBA light-heavyweight title |
| 42 | Win | 34–5–1 (2) | Conny Velensek | PTS | 10 (10) | 1971-10-14 | Germany | |
| 41 | Win | 33–5–1 (2) | Eddie Jones | UD | 15 (15) | 1971-08-21 | Nuevo Circo, Caracas, Venezuela | Retained WBA light-heavyweight title |
| 40 | Win | 32–5–1 (2) | Johnny Griffin | PTS | 10 (10) | 1971-07-11 | Valencia, Venezuela | |
| 39 | Win | 31–5–1 (2) | Piero Del Papa | KO | 1 (15) | 1971-06-05 | Nuevo Circo, Caracas, Venezuela | Retained WBA light-heavyweight title |
| 38 | Win | 30–5–1 (2) | Jimmy Dupree | KO | 6 (15) | 1971-02-27 | Nuevo Circo, Caracas, Venezuela | Won vacant WBA light-heavyweight title |
| 37 | Win | 29–5–1 (2) | Roger Rouse | UD | 10 (10) | 1970-11-07 | Hiram Bithorn Stadium, San Juan, Puerto Rico | |
| 36 | Win | 28–5–1 (2) | Willie Johnson | TKO | 4 (10) | 1970-10-06 | Auditorium, Miami Beach, Florida, U.S. | |
| 35 | Win | 27–5–1 (2) | Hydra Lacy | KO | 2 (10) | 1970-08-11 | Auditorium, Miami Beach, Florida, U.S. | |
| 34 | Win | 26–5–1 (2) | Levan Roundtree | PTS | 10 (10) | 1970-05-20 | Parque Isidoro García, Mayagüez, Puerto Rico | |
| 33 | Win | 25–5–1 (2) | Fred Williams | KO | 4 (10) | 1970-04-18 | San Juan, Puerto Rico | |
| 32 | Win | 24–5–1 (2) | Avenamar Peralta | PTS | 10 (10) | 1969-12-06 | Estadio Luna Park, Buenos Aires, Argentina | |
| 31 | Win | 23–5–1 (2) | Randy Stevens | KO | 5 (10) | 1969-11-29 | San Juan, Puerto Rico | |
| 30 | Win | 22–5–1 (2) | Angel Oquendo | TKO | 6 (10) | 1969-10-26 | San Juan, Puerto Rico | |
| 29 | NC | 21–5–1 (2) | Paul Johnson | NC | 7 (10) | 1969-08-09 | San Juan, Puerto Rico | |
| 28 | Win | 21–5–1 (1) | Eddie Talhami | PTS | 10 (10) | 1969-07-05 | San Juan, Puerto Rico | |
| 27 | Win | 20–5–1 (1) | Jose Luis Garcia | PTS | 12 (12) | 1969-05-30 | Caracas, Venezuela | Won vacant Venezuelan light-heavyweight title |
| 26 | Win | 19–5–1 (1) | Karl Zurheide | UD | 10 (10) | 1969-05-06 | Aragon Ballroom, Chicago, Illinois, U.S. | |
| 25 | Win | 18–5–1 (1) | Allen Thomas | UD | 10 (10) | 1969-04-01 | Aragon Ballroom, Chicago, Illinois, U.S. | |
| 24 | Loss | 17–5–1 (1) | Bennie Briscoe | TKO | 8 (10) | 1969-01-25 | San Juan, Puerto Rico | |
| 23 | Win | 17–4–1 (1) | Charlie Jordan | UD | 10 (10) | 1968-11-26 | Auditorium, Miami Beach, Florida, U.S. | |
| 22 | Win | 16–4–1 (1) | Charlie Jordan | UD | 10 (10) | 1968-11-12 | Auditorium, Miami Beach, Florida, U.S. | |
| 21 | Loss | 15–4–1 (1) | Juarez de Lima | PTS | 10 (10) | 1968-11-03 | San Juan, Puerto Rico | |
| 20 | Win | 15–3–1 (1) | Bennie Briscoe | UD | 10 (10) | 1968-09-23 | Hiram Bithorn Stadium, San Juan, Puerto Rico | |
| 19 | Win | 14–3–1 (1) | Charley Austin | PTS | 10 (10) | 1968-09-09 | San Juan, Puerto Rico | |
| 18 | Loss | 13–3–1 (1) | Luis Manuel Rodríguez | UD | 10 (10) | 1968-07-18 | Hiram Bithorn Stadium, San Juan, Puerto Rico | |
| 17 | Win | 13–2–1 (1) | Luis Manuel Rodríguez | UD | 10 (10) | 1968-06-03 | Hiram Bithorn Stadium, San Juan, Puerto Rico | |
| 16 | Loss | 12–2–1 (1) | Jose Gonzalez | TKO | 8 (10) | 1968-04-19 | National Maritime Union Hall, New York City, New York, U.S. | |
| 15 | Loss | 12–1–1 (1) | Bobby Warthen | SD | 10 (10) | 1968-01-12 | National Maritime Union Hall, New York City, New York, U.S. | |
| 14 | Win | 12–0–1 (1) | Phil Robinson | KO | 5 (10) | 1967-12-14 | Caracas, Venezuela | |
| 13 | Draw | 11–0–1 (1) | Harold Richardson | PTS | 10 (10) | 1967-11-10 | San Juan, Puerto Rico | |
| 12 | Win | 11–0 (1) | Pedro Miranda | TKO | 10 (10) | 1967-10-14 | San Juan, Puerto Rico | |
| 11 | Win | 10–0 (1) | Tony Smith | KO | 3 (10) | 1967-09-08 | Estadio Manuel Carrasquillo Herpen, Río Piedras, Puerto Rico | |
| 10 | Win | 9–0 (1) | Marco Tulio Polanco | KO | 3 (10) | 1967-06-12 | Nuevo Circo, Caracas, Venezuela | |
| 9 | Win | 8–0 (1) | Danny Machado | TKO | 4 (10) | 1967-03-20 | Palacio de Deportes, Caracas, Venezuela | |
| 8 | NC | 7–0 (1) | Marco Tulio Polanco | NC | 2 (10) | 1966-12-04 | Nuevo Circo, Caracas, Venezuela | Suspended on account of rain |
| 7 | Win | 7–0 | Marcos Pirella | KO | 2 (10) | 1966-11-14 | Caracas, Venezuela | |
| 6 | Win | 6–0 | Melville Bennett | KO | 2 (10) | 1966-09-16 | Caracas, Venezuela | |
| 5 | Win | 5–0 | Marco Tulio Polanco | KO | 3 (10) | 1966-06-24 | Nuevo Circo, Caracas, Venezuela | |
| 4 | Win | 4–0 | Pedro Vanegas | KO | 7 (10) | 1965-12-05 | Estadio Once de Noviembre, Cartagena, Colombia | |
| 3 | Win | 3–0 | Pedro Vanegas | TKO | 4 (10) | 1965-10-29 | Coliseo Humberto Perea, Barranquilla, Colombia | |
| 2 | Win | 2–0 | Joe Louis Troconis | KO | 1 (?) | 1965-07-26 | Palacio de Deportes, Caracas, Venezuela | |
| 1 | Win | 1–0 | Jose Caraballo | KO | 3 (?) | 1965-06-28 | Palacio de Deportes, Caracas, Venezuela | |

== See also ==
- List of world light-heavyweight boxing champions

Sporting positions
Regional boxing titles
| New title | Venezuelan light-heavyweight champion May 30, 1969 – February 27, 1971; Won world title | Vacant Title next held by Dervin Colina |
World boxing titles
| Vacant Title last held by Bob Foster | WBA light-heavyweight champion February 27, 1971 – April 7, 1972 | Succeeded by Bob Foster |
