= Bobby Cassidy =

American boxer (1944–2022)

Robert Cassidy Sr. (April 19, 1944 – December 11, 2022) was an American professional boxer and actor, who fought from 1963 to 1980. Although born and raised in New York, Cassidy is of Irish lineage and fought under the name, "Irish" Bobby Cassidy.

Cassidy was a southpaw (left-handed) who was world-rated in the junior middleweight, middleweight, light heavyweight and cruiserweight divisions. In 1975, he was ranked number one in the world as a light heavyweight by the World Boxing Council.

== Biography ==
In 1963, Cassidy, from Levittown, Long Island, New York, scored a one-punch, 39-second knockout in his professional debut at Sunnyside Garden. He went on to compile a ring record of 59 wins, 16 losses, three draws, one no contest and 27 knockouts. Among the notable fighters that he defeated were Don Fullmer, Jimmy Dupree, Tom Bethea, Isaac Logart, Ramon Ranquello, Tommy Hicks and Christy Elliott. He also fought world champions Luis Manuel Rodríguez, Rodrigo Valdez and Alessandro Mazzinghi.

In a six-month span of 1973, Cassidy fought Dupree three times, for a total of 30 rounds. Both light heavyweights were ranked in the top 10 at the time. They fought to a draw in the first fight, Dupree won a split decision in the second fight and Cassidy won a unanimous decision in the third. The final meeting was held at Madison Square Garden's Felt Forum. Cassidy dropped Dupree three times in the fight. The Dupree fights were part of stretch during which Cassidy fought eight consecutive opponents ranked in the Top 10.

Throughout his career he fought main events in both the old and current Madison Square Garden.

After his boxing career, Cassidy began training fighters and has worked with two world champions, WBC light heavyweight champion Donny Lalonde and WBO middleweight champion Lonnie Bradley. He also trained Ugandan contender Godfrey Nyakana.

As an actor, Cassidy has appeared in three films, Rocky, Uncle Joe Shannon and This Thing of Ours.

In 2007, his son, boxing writer Bobby Cassidy Jr., wrote a play, Kid Shamrock, based on his life and boxing career. It has been produced Off Broadway three times. In June 2007 at the Producers Club. In February 2011 at the Atlantic Theater Company, Stage 2, and in November–December 2011 at TADA! Theater. The cast has featured several former boxers, including John Duddy, Seamus McDonagh and Mark Breland. The most recent production was directed by former WBO heavyweight champion Michael Bentt.

Cassidy was inducted into the New Jersey Boxing Hall of Fame in 2001, the New York State Boxing Hall of Fame in 2013 and the Florida Boxing Hall of Fame in 2018.

Cassidy died on December 11, 2022, at the age of 79.
