= Bob Foster (boxer) =

American boxer (1938–2015)

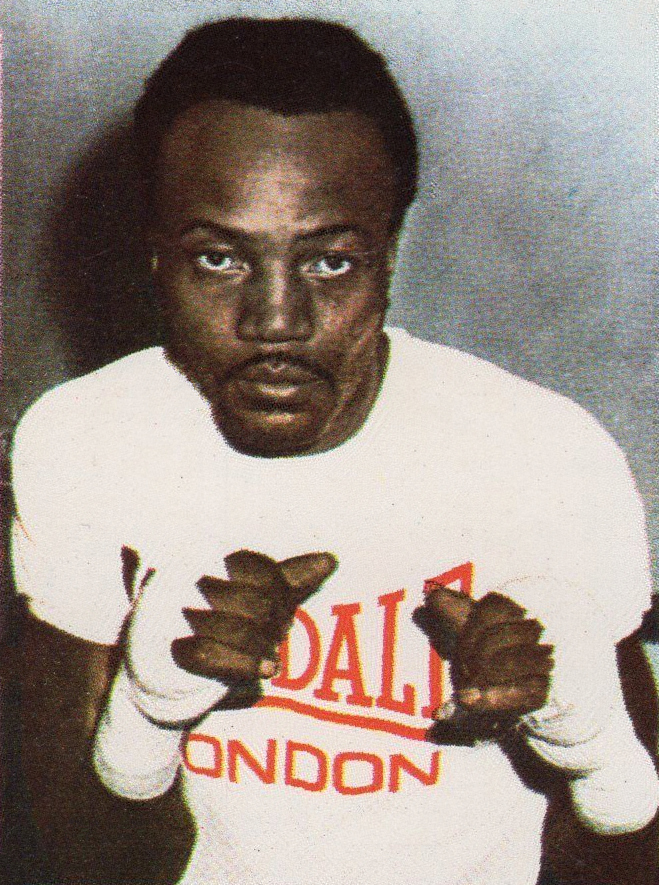
- Foster c. 1972

Personal information
- Nickname: The Deputy Sheriff
- Born: Robert Wayne Foster; December 15, 1938 Borger, Texas, U.S.
- Died: November 21, 2015 (aged 77) Albuquerque, New Mexico, U.S.
- Height: 6 ft 3 in (191 cm)
- Weight: Light heavyweight; Heavyweight

Boxing career
- Reach: 79 in (201 cm)
- Stance: Orthodox

Boxing record
- Total fights: 65
- Wins: 56
- Win by KO: 46
- Losses: 8
- Draws: 1
Medal record
Men's amateur boxing
Representing United States
Pan American Games
Silver medal – second place	1959 Chicago	Middleweight

Robert Wayne Foster (December 15, 1938 – November 21, 2015) was an American professional boxer who fought as a light heavyweight and heavyweight. He won the world light heavyweight title from Dick Tiger in 1968 via fourth-round knockout, and went on to defend the title fourteen times against thirteen different fighters in total from 1968 to 1974. Foster challenged Joe Frazier and Muhammad Ali during his career, but was knocked out by both (the fight with Frazier being for the WBA, WBC and The Ring world heavyweight titles). He was named to Ring's list of 100 Greatest Punchers of all time. He was also named to Ring's list of the 80 Best Fighters of the Last 80 Years, ranking at No. 55. He was inducted into the International Boxing Hall of Fame in the inaugural class of 1990.

== Early life ==
Foster was born at Borger, Texas on December 15, 1938. In his childhood years his family moved to Albuquerque in New Mexico, and he received his formal education at Albuquerque High School. Upon leaving school he enlisted with the United States Air Force, in which he served with the rank of Airman Second Class. He began boxing on the Golden Gloves amateur circuit, and also took part in competitive inter-service matches for the U.S. Air Force.

== Boxing career ==
Foster started his professional career on the night of March 27, 1961, against Duke Williams, in Washington, D.C., winning by knockout in two rounds. The first 12 bouts of his career were spent campaigning in the United States' Eastern coast and in Canada. In his tenth bout, he made his first of multiple forays into the heavyweight division, and suffered his first loss, at the hands of Doug Jones, by a knockout in the eighth round.

After two more wins, he went in 1963 to Peru, where he lost to South American champion Mauro Mina by a decision in ten rounds at Lima. This was his first major Light Heavyweight bout, but it wouldn't be his last.

Three more fights back in the States resulted in quick knockout wins for him, and then, in 1964, he made his second attempt at entering the heavyweight rankings, being knocked out in the seventh by future world Heavyweight champion Ernie Terrell. He finished the year by posting three more knockout wins at Light Heavyweight, two of them in the month of November. The night of November 11 was Foster's first win of note as a light-heavyweight. One month after knocking out Don Quinn in the first round, he stepped up in the ring again and faced former world title challenger Henry Hank. He beat Hank by a knockout in the tenth.

In 1965, he had five fights, winning four and losing one. He beat Hank again, by decision in 12 rounds, and lost to Zora Folley, by a decision in ten rounds, in another attempt at joining the heavyweight top ten.

In 1966 he defeated Leroy Green in two rounds.

By 1967, Foster, although his attempts to become a top heavyweight were being frustrated, was a ranked light heavyweight. He decided to stick to the light-heavyweight division for the time being, and he won all seven of his fights, six by knockout. Among the fighters he beat were Eddie Cotton, Eddie Vick, and Sonny Moore. After defeating Moore, Foster became the world's number one ranked light heavyweight challenger.

=== World light-heavyweight champion ===
In 1968, Foster got his first shot at a world title. At Madison Square Garden in New York, on the night of March 24, Foster became world champion by knocking out Dick Tiger in four rounds. Tiger had been a two-time world middleweight champion and was defending his world light heavyweight crown that night. Foster then decided to box at heavyweight once again, and beat Charlie Polite by a knockout in three. He ended that year defeating Vick again, and his future world title challenger Roger Rouse, both by a knockout.

In 1969, he began by rising off the canvas to knock out Frank DePaula in the same first round and retain his belt. Foster's next fight in 1969 was against Andy Kendall, whom he beat in four rounds by knockout, to once again retain the crown. He closed the 1960s with two more knockout wins.

=== Frazier vs Foster ===
In 1970, Foster made two more trips to the heavyweights. In the first, he beat fringe contender Lee Wallace in six rounds by knockout. This was followed by a return to the light-heavyweight division to defend his title against Rouse. Infuriated by some comments that Rouse's manager had made before the bout concerning the fact that even though Foster knocked out Rouse in their first bout he was not able to drop him, Foster dropped Rouse five times en route to a fourth-round knockout victory. A knockout in 10 to retain the title against Mark Tessman followed, and then he was given the chance to challenge for the world heavyweight title. Facing world champion Joe Frazier on the night of November 18 in Detroit, he was knocked out in the second round.

After defeating Hal Carroll by a knockout in four rounds to defend his crown, the WBA stripped him of the title, but he was still recognized by the WBC as a champion. Foster became enraged at the WBA, which proceeded to have Vicente Rondon of Venezuela and Jimmy Dupree fight for the world title. Rondon won, becoming the second Latin American world light-heavyweight champion (after José Torres), and Foster set his eyes on him. Foster went on defending his WBC title, and he defeated challengers Ray Anderson, Tommy Hicks, and Brian Kelly. Of those three, it was Anderson who was the only one to last the 15 round distance with Foster.

=== Ali vs Foster ===
Foster and Rondon met in Miami on April 7, 1972, in a unification bout. Foster became the undisputed world champion once again, by knocking Rondon out in the second round. In his next fight, he used what many critics have called one of the best punches in history to retain his title by a knockout in four against Mike Quarry. Foster then went up in weight and faced former world heavyweight champion Muhammad Ali, on November 21, 1972, in what was legendary referee Mills Lane's first bout of note as a referee. Foster lost to Ali by a knockout in the eighth, after being knocked down 7 times.

In 1973, Foster retained his title twice against Pierre Fourie, both by decision. Their second fight had a distinct social impact because it was fought in apartheid-ruled South Africa, Foster being Black and Fourie being White. Foster became a hero to South African Blacks by beating Fourie the first time around, and in their rematch, the first boxing fight in South Africa during apartheid featuring a White versus a Black, he cemented that position by defeating Fourie on points again.

Piet Koornhoff was the South African Minister of Sport at that time and he had to be persuaded to allow the fight. He had to amend the regulations relating to the prohibition of "mixed sport" in order to do so. Foster was allowed into the country on condition that he refrain from making any political comments or speeches. In a post fight interview he diplomatically responded to a question that he liked the country and would be willing to come back again. This explains the sentiment of Mark Mathabane as noted in his autobiography Kaffir Boy, that South Africa's black population felt betrayed by Foster since he did not address apartheid during his time in South Africa.

His last defense as world light-heavyweight champion came in 1974, when he was dropped by Argentinian Jorge Ahumada, but managed to keep the title with a draw. After that, he announced his retirement, leaving the world's light-heavyweight championship vacant.

Foster returned to boxing in 1975, before retiring from the sport in 1978 at the age of 36.

== Post-boxing life ==
In the mid-1970s Foster became a police officer with the Bernalillo County Sheriff's Department, later becoming a detective and a well known policeman in Albuquerque, New Mexico.

== Personal life ==
He married Pearl with whom he had four children. He divorced then married Sue. He had a child named Nelson. Foster married Patricia Saiz in 1982. Her death in 1984 was ruled a suicide. His fourth wife was Rosetta Benjamin.

Foster died at the age of 77 on November 21, 2015, in a hospital in Albuquerque, New Mexico.

== Professional boxing record ==
65 fights	56 wins	8 losses
By knockout	46	6
By decision	10	2
Draws	1	

No.	Result	Record	Opponent	Type	Round, time	Date	Location	Notes
65	Loss	56–8–1	Bob Hazelton	TKO	2 (10)	Jun 2, 1978	Century II Convention Hall, Wichita, Kansas, U.S.	
64	Loss	56–7–1	Mustafa Wassaja	RTD	5 (8)	Feb 9, 1978	K.B. Hallen, Copenhagen, Denmark	
63	Win	56–6–1	Bob Hazelton	KO	10 (10), 0:22	Sep 2, 1977	Willemstad, Curaçao, Netherlands Antilles	
62	Win	55–6–1	Al Bolden	KO	6 (10)	Sep 25, 1976	Spokane Coliseum, Spokane, Washington, U.S.	
61	Win	54–6–1	Harold Carter	UD	10	Aug 28, 1976	Eagles Aerie, Missoula, Montana, U.S.	
60	Win	53–6–1	Al Bolden	KO	3 (10), 2:53	May 8, 1976	Adams Field House, Missoula, Montana, U.S.	
59	Win	52–6–1	Bill Hardney	KO	3 (10), 1:26	Jun 28, 1975	Sweeney Gym, Santa Fe, New Mexico, U.S.	
58	Draw	51–6–1	Jorge Ahumada	SD	15	Jun 17, 1974	University Arena, Albuquerque, New Mexico, U.S.	Retained WBA, WBC, and The Ring light heavyweight titles
57	Win	51–6	Pierre Fourie	UD	15	Dec 1, 1973	Rand Stadium, Johannesburg, Transvaalx South Africa	Retained WBA, WBC, and The Ring light heavyweight titles
56	Win	50–6	Pierre Fourie	UD	15	Aug 21, 1973	University Arena, Albuquerque, New Mexico, U.S.	Retained WBA, WBC and The Ring light heavyweight titles
55	Loss	49–6	Muhammad Ali	KO	8 (12), 0:40	Nov 21, 1972	Sahara Tahoe Hotel, Stateline, Nevada, U.S.	For WBC-NABF heavyweight title
54	Win	49–5	Chris Finnegan	KO	14 (15), 0:55	Sep 26, 1972	Empire Pool, Wembley, London, England	Retained WBA, WBC, and The Ring light heavyweight titles
53	Win	48–5	Mike Quarry	KO	4 (15), 3:00	Jun 27, 1972	Las Vegas Convention Center, Las Vegas, Nevada, U.S.	Retained WBA, WBC, and The Ring light heavyweight titles
52	Win	47–5	Vicente Rondón	KO	2 (15), 2:55	Apr 7, 1972	Miami Beach Convention Hall, Miami Beach, Florida, U.S.	Retained WBC and The Ring light heavyweight titles; Won WBA light heavyweight title
51	Win	46–5	Brian Kelly	TKO	3 (15), 1:56	Dec 16, 1971	Fairgrounds Arena, Oklahoma City, Oklahoma, U.S.	Retained WBC and The Ring light heavyweight titles
50	Win	45–5	Tommy Hicks	TKO	8 (15)	Oct 30, 1971	Catholic Youth Center, Scranton, Pennsylvania, U.S.	Retained WBC and The Ring light heavyweight titles
49	Win	44–5	Vernon McIntosh	TKO	3 (10), 0:37	Aug 17, 1971	Miami Beach, Florida, U.S.	
48	Win	43–5	Ray Anderson	UD	15	Apr 24, 1971	Curtis Hixon Hall, Tampa, Florida, U.S.	Retained WBC and The Ring light heavyweight titles
47	Win	42–5	Hal Carroll	TKO	4 (15), 2:32	Mar 2, 1971	Catholic Youth Center, Scranton, Pennsylvania, U.S.	Retained WBC and The Ring light heavyweight titles
46	Loss	41–5	Joe Frazier	KO	2 (15), 0:49	Nov 18, 1970	Cobo Arena, Detroit, Michigan, U.S.	For WBA, WBC, and The Ring heavyweight titles
45	Win	41–4	Mark Tessman	TKO	10 (15), 2:00	Jun 27, 1970	Baltimore Civic Center, Baltimore, Maryland, U.S.	Retained WBA, WBC, and The Ring light heavyweight titles
44	Win	40–4	Roger Rouse	RTD	3 (15), 3:00	Apr 4, 1970	Adams Field House, Missoula, Montana, U.S.	Retained WBA, WBC, and The Ring light heavyweight titles
43	Win	39–4	Roy Wallace	KO	6 (10)	Mar 9, 1970	Fort Homer W. Hesterly Armory, Tampa, Florida, U.S.	
42	Win	38–4	Bill Hardney	TKO	4 (10)	Feb 24, 1970	Orlando Sports Stadium, Orlando, Florida, U.S.	
41	Win	37–4	Chuck Leslie	TKO	5 (10), 2:58	Nov 2, 1969	New Orleans Municipal Auditorium, New Orleans, Louisiana, U.S.	
40	Win	36–4	Levan Roundtree	TKO	4 (10), 2:10	Jun 19, 1969	Atlanta Municipal Auditorium, Atlanta, Georgia, U.S.	
39	Win	35–4	Andy Kendall	TKO	4 (15), 1:15	May 24, 1969	Eastern States Coliseum, West Springfield, Massachusetts, U.S.	Retained WBA, WBC, and The Ring light heavyweight titles
38	Win	34–4	Frank DePaula	TKO	1 (15), 2:17	Jan 22, 1969	Madison Square Garden, New York City, New York, U.S.	Retained WBA, WBC, and The Ring light heavyweight titles
37	Win	33–4	Roger Rouse	TKO	5 (10), 2:34	Sep 9, 1968	Washington Coliseum, Washington, D.C., U.S.	
36	Win	32–4	Eddie Vick	TKO	9 (10)	Aug 26, 1968	Tingley Coliseum, Albuquerque, New Mexico, U.S.	
35	Win	31–4	Charley Polite	TKO	3 (10)	Jul 29, 1968	Eastern States Coliseum, West Springfield, Massachusetts, U.S.	
34	Win	30–4	Dick Tiger	KO	4 (15), 2:05	May 24, 1968	Madison Square Garden, New York City, New York, U.S.	Won WBA, WBC, and The Ring light heavyweight titles
33	Win	29–4	Sonny Moore	KO	5 (10)	Dec 5, 1967	Washington Coliseum, Washington, D.C., U.S.	
32	Win	28–4	Eddie Vick	UD	10	Nov 20, 1967	Providence Coliseum, Providence, Rhode Island, U.S.	
31	Win	27–4	Levan Roundtree	KO	8 (10), 1:35	Oct 25, 1967	Washington Coliseum, Washington, D.C., U.S.	
30	Win	26–4	Henry Matthews	TKO	2 (10)	Jun 9, 1967	Starland Arena, Roanoke, Virginia, U.S.	
29	Win	25–4	Eddie Cotton	KO	3 (12), 1:58	May 8, 1967	Washington Coliseum, Washington, D.C., U.S.	
28	Win	24–4	Andres Antonio Selpa	KO	2 (10), 2:30	Feb 27, 1967	Washington Coliseum, Washington, D.C., U.S.	
27	Win	23–4	Jim Robinson	KO	1 (10)	Jan 16, 1967	Washington Coliseum, Washington, D.C., U.S.	
26	Win	22–4	LeRoy Green	KO	2 (?)	Dec 6, 1966	Norfolk Arena, Norfolk, Virginia, U.S.	
25	Loss	21–4	Zora Folley	UD	10	Dec 6, 1965	Municipal Auditorium, New Orleans, Louisiana, U.S.	
24	Win	21–3	Henry Hank	UD	12	Jul 26, 1965	Municipal Auditorium, New Orleans, Louisiana, U.S.	
23	Win	20–3	Chuck Leslie	TKO	3 (10), 2:58	May 24, 1965	Municipal Auditorium, New Orleans, Louisiana, U.S.	
22	Win	19–3	Dave Russell	TKO	6 (10), 1:30	Mar 21, 1965	Norfolk Arena, Norfolk, Virginia, U.S.	
21	Win	18–3	Bobby Rascon	KO	2 (10)	Feb 15, 1965	Albuquerque Civic Auditorium, Albuquerque, New Mexico, U.S.	
20	Win	17–3	Henry Hank	TKO	9 (10)	Dec 11, 1964	Municipal Auditorium, Norfolk, Virginia, U.S.	
19	Win	16–3	Norman Letcher	TKO	1 (10), 0:43	Nov 23, 1964	Kezar Pavilion, San Francisco, California, U.S.	
18	Win	15–3	Don Quinn	KO	1 (10), 1:07	Nov 11, 1964	Norfolk, Virginia, U.S.	
17	Loss	14–3	Ernie Terrell	TKO	7 (10), 0:58	Jul 10, 1964	Madison Square Garden, New York City, New York, U.S.	
16	Win	14–2	Allen Thomas	TKO	1 (10), 1:26	May 8, 1964	Chicago Coliseum, Chicago, Illinois, U.S.	
15	Win	13–2	Dave Bailey	KO	1 (6)	Feb 25, 1964	Miami Beach Convention Hall, Miami Beach, Florida, U.S.	
14	Win	12–2	Willi Besmanoff	KO	3 (10), 2:55	Dec 11, 1963	Arena, Norfolk, Virginia, U.S.	
13	Loss	11–2	Mauro Mina	UD	10	Nov 7, 1963	Estadio Nacional, Lima, Peru	
12	Win	11–1	Curtis Bruce	KO	4 (8), 2:33	Apr 29, 1963	Capitol Arena, Washington, D.C., U.S.	
11	Win	10–1	Richard Benjamin	KO	1 (8), 0:47	Feb 18, 1963	Capitol Arena, Washington, D.C., U.S.	
10	Loss	9–1	Doug Jones	TKO	8 (10), 0:23	Oct 20, 1962	Madison Square Garden, New York City, New York, U.S.	
9	Win	9–0	Bert Whitehurst	SD	8	Jun 27, 1962	Sunnyside Garden Arena, New York City, New York, U.S.	
8	Win	8–0	Billy Tisdale	TKO	2 (6)	May 19, 1962	St. Nicholas Arena, New York City, New York, U.S.	
7	Win	7–0	Clarence Floyd	KO	4 (6), 2:56	Dec 4, 1961	Maple Leaf Gardens, Toronto, Ontario, Canada	
6	Win	6–0	Ernie Knox	TKO	3 (6)	Nov 21, 1961	Norfolk, Virginia, U.S.	
5	Win	5–0	Floyd McCoy	PTS	6	Aug 8, 1961	Delormier Stadium, Montreal, Quebec, Canada	
4	Win	4–0	Ray Bryan	TKO	2 (6)	Jun 22, 1961	Forum, Montreal, Quebec, Canada	
3	Win	3–0	Billy Johnson	PTS	4	May 8, 1961	St. Nicholas Arena, New York City, New York, U.S.	
2	Win	2–0	Clarence Ryan	PTS	4	Apr 3, 1961	St. Nicholas Arena, New York City, New York, U.S.	
1	Win	1–0	Duke Williams	KO	2 (5), 2:03	Mar 27, 1961	Capitol Arena, Washington, District of Columbia, U.S.	

== Titles in boxing ==
=== Major world titles ===
- WBA light heavyweight champion (175 lbs) (2×)
- WBC light heavyweight champion (175 lbs)

=== The Ring magazine titles ===
- The Ring light heavyweight champion (175 lbs)

=== Undisputed titles ===
- Undisputed light heavyweight champion (2×)

== See also ==
- List of WBC world champions

Sporting positions
World boxing titles
Preceded by Dick Tiger	WBA light heavyweight champion May 24, 1968 – December 9, 1970; Stripped	Vacant Title next held by Vicente Rondón
Preceded by Dick Tiger	WBC light heavyweight champion May 24, 1968 – September 16, 1974; Retired	Vacant Title next held by John Conteh
Preceded by Dick Tiger	The Ring light heavyweight champion May 24, 1968 – September 16, 1974; Retired	Vacant Title next held by Matthew Saad Muhammad
Preceded by Dick Tiger	Undisputed light heavyweight champion May 24, 1968 – December 9, 1970; Titles fragmented	Vacant Title next held by Himself
Preceded by Vicente Rondón	WBA light heavyweight champion April 7, 1972 – September 16, 1974; Retired	Vacant Title next held by Víctor Galíndez
Vacant Title last held by Himself	Undisputed light heavyweight champion April 7, 1972 – September 16, 1974; Retired	Vacant Title next held by Michael Spinks
