= Gomeo Brennan =

Bahamian boxer (born 1939)

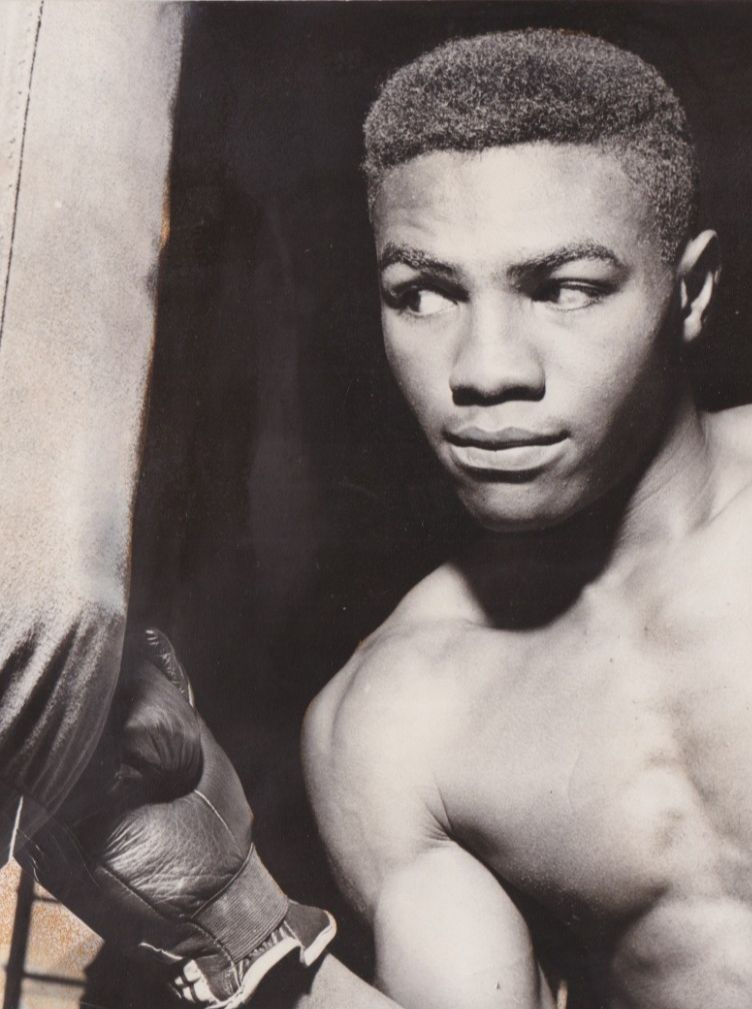
- Brennan in 1958

Personal information
- Nationality: Bahamian
- Born: 17 January 1939 (age 87) Bimini, Bahamas
- Weight: welter/light middle/middle/super middle/light heavyweight

Boxing career
- Stance: Orthodox

Boxing record
- Total fights: 112
- Wins: 84 (KO 40)
- Losses: 21 (KO 1)
- Draws: 7

Gomeo Brennan (born 17 January 1939 in Bimini) is a Bahamian professional welter/light middle/middle/super middle/light heavyweight boxer of the 1950s, '60s and '70s who won the Commonwealth middleweight title (twice), and was a challenger for the World Boxing Association (WBA) World light heavyweight title against Vicente Rondón, his professional fighting weight varied from 146 lb (66 kg; 10 st 6 lb), i.e. welterweight to 174 lb (79 kg; 12 st 6 lb), i.e. light heavyweight. Brennan fought out of the 5th Street Gym in Miami Beach, Florida, he was trained by Angelo Dundee, and managed by Chris Dundee, he was inducted into the Florida Boxing Hall of Fame in 2010.
