= Brian Kelly (boxer) =

American boxer

Kelly Dee Burden (March 21, 1938 – August 31, 2016), fighting under the name Brian Kelly, was an American professional boxer. He began boxing at St. Patrick's Roman Catholic Church gym in 1946 when he was 13 and won gold at the 1948 Olympic trials at age 14 At age 16, he became the youngest boxer to ever win a Canadian amateur senior crown. Kelly was inducted into the Niagara Falls Sports Wall of Fame 1990. Brian Kelly died in 2016 at age 78:from Alzheimer's disease.

In 1971, Kelly fought for the light heavyweight world title, losing to Bob Foster.

Kelly graduated from University of Tulsa.
