= Jimmy Dupree =

American boxer

James Walter Dupree (April 27, 1936 – January 25, 2014) was an American professional boxer who competed from 1961 to 1974, challenging for the WBA light-heavyweight title in 1971.

== Career ==
=== Early career ===
Dupree started off in 1961, winning seven matches before losing to Paul Johnson by knockout. He pulled together a streak of wins after a draw and a loss to Harold Richardson a bit later on in his career. He lost to Johnny Persol in 1965, ending this streak. Dupree had a few more fights, a few losses but most wins before he put together a massive streak that lasted for three years, from 1968 to 1971. This led to Jimmy becoming the top contender for the titles held by Bob Foster. Since Bob didn't seem eager to fight Jimmy or second-ranked contender Vicente Rondón, the WBA title was made vacant and the two fought for it. Against Vicente Rondón, Jimmy fell short, losing by knockout in the sixth round. The cards were roughly even at the time.

=== Controversy With Rondon ===
After the fight with Vicente, controversy broke out. The source was Dupree himself, claiming he was drugged and that was why he had lost. The United Press International published a story covering the claim. A friend of Dupree and registered nurse Charliese Smith said "I believe Jimmy was drugged. I saw Jimmy after the fight and he was very very weak. His vision was blurry and he couldn't even see the other side of the room." She continued to say, "I know of muscle relaxants that can be administered in food and I'm convinced that Jimmy was given something." Regardless of the charges, the World Boxing Association still saw Rondón as their world champion, while The Ring magazine viewed Bob Foster as the legitimate Light heavyweight king since he hadn't lost his crown in the ring.

=== Later career ===
After his title fight, Dupree never again achieved such success, or anything even close to it. He won two more matches before losing to Mike Quarry, later splitting fights with Eddie Owens. Dupree won the rubber match before going 1-1-1 with Bobby Cassidy, taking a draw and a loss then retiring from boxing.
