= Randy Neumann =

American boxer and boxing referee

Personal information
- Nationality: American
- Born: Randolph Neumann; July 21, 1948 (age 78)
- Weight: Heavyweight

Boxing career

Boxing record
- Total fights: 38
- Wins: 31
- Win by KO: 11
- Losses: 7
- Draws: 0

Randolph Neumann (born July 21, 1948), raised in Cliffside Park, New Jersey, is a former professional boxer who has been a referee for the New York State Athletic Commission since 1982. He has been the "third man" in many championship matches that have taken place in Madison Square Garden in New York City.

== Boxer ==
As a boxer, he compiled a professional record of 31 wins (11 by way of knockout) and 7 losses in 38 contests. In his career, he faced the likes of Jimmy Young, Chuck Wepner, and Jerry Quarry. He was ranked as high as the #9 contender worldwide at the Heavyweight division. However, after graduating from Fairleigh Dickinson University in Teaneck, New Jersey with a degree in business in 1975, he decided to retire from boxing. He won the New Jersey State Heavyweight title in 1971 by beating Chuck Wepner. The pair fought for that title three times, with Wepner winning twice.

Though he came back for one more bout as a Cruiserweight against Ibar Arrington on April 15, 1977, he retired from prizefighting for good to focus on acting, writing, and a business career.

== Retirement ==
Neumann was elected to the board of directors by the members of the International Boxing Federation at their annual convention, held in Montreal in May 2015. While there, he attended his first board meeting at which time he was elected Treasurer of the organization. Although he no longer referees fights (which he did for 31 years), he now supervises championship fights around the world. From 1983 to 2014, he refereed 339 fights, including many world title ones.

Today he is the president of Randy Neumann Wealth Management, located in Upper Saddle River, New Jersey.

== Professional boxing record ==
31 Wins (11 knockouts, 20 decisions), 7 Losses (5 knockouts, 2 decisions)
Result	Record	Opponent	Type	Round	Date	Location	Notes
Loss	19-2-1	(United States) Ibar Arrington	TKO	5	15/04/1977	(United States) William L. Dickinson High School, Jersey City, New Jersey	
Loss	32-0	(United States) Duane Bobick	TKO	4	12/12/1975	(United States) Madison Square Garden, New York City, New York	Referee stopped the bout at 2:17 of the fourth round.
Win	7-5	(United States) Bobby Walker	UD	10	17/10/1975	(United States) Long Island Arena, Commack, New York	
Win	32-5	(United States) Boone Kirkman	UD	10	05/09/1975	(United States) Las Vegas, Nevada	
Loss	7-10-2	(Trinidad and Tobago) Wendell Joseph	DQ	6	27/06/1975	(The Bahamas) Nassau, Bahamas	
Win	17-8-4	(United Kingdom) Billy Aird	TKO	8	05/06/1975	(United Kingdom) Cunard Hotel, London	
Win	19-16	(Canada) Larry Renaud	PTS	10	08/04/1975	(United States) Orlando, Florida	
Win	6-7	(United States) "Irish" Bob Scott	DQ	2	21/03/1975	(The Bahamas) Bimini, Bahamas	
Win	13-7	(United States) Larry Beilfuss	TKO	5	04/02/1975	(United States) Milwaukee Auditorium, Milwaukee, Wisconsin	Referee stopped the bout at 2:08 of the fifth round.
Win	20-20-1	(Trinidad and Tobago) Carl "Tank" Baker	TKO	10	15/12/1974	(The Bahamas) Nassau, Bahamas	
Loss	27-9-2	(United States) Chuck Wepner	TKO	6	08/03/1974	(United States) Madison Square Garden, New York City, New York	New Jersey Heavyweight Title.
Win	11-4-1	(Argentina) Reinaldo Raul Gorosito	PTS	10	05/11/1973	(United States) Felt Forum, New York City, New York	
Win	26-4	(Puerto Rico) Pedro Agosto	TKO	9	10/09/1973	(United States) Madison Square Garden, New York City, New York	
Win	13-2	(United States) Doug Kirk	TKO	2	19/04/1973	(United States) Embassy Hall, North Bergen, New Jersey	
Loss	43-6-4	(United States) Jerry Quarry	RTD	7	05/01/1973	(United States) Madison Square Garden, New York City, New York	
Win	5-2-2	(United States) G.G. Maldonado	TKO	6	26/10/1972	(United States) Embassy Hall, North Bergen, New Jersey	
Win	1-1-1	(United States) Alex Carr	KO	1	14/09/1972	(United States) Embassy Hall, North Bergen, New Jersey	Carr knocked out at 1:24 of the first round.
Loss	22-9-2	(United States) Chuck Wepner	PTS	12	15/04/1972	(United States) Jersey City, New Jersey	New Jersey Heavyweight Title.
Win	7-2	(United States) Jimmy Young	PTS	10	10/03/1972	(United States) Madison Square Garden, New York City, New York	
Win	22-8-2	(United States) Chuck Wepner	PTS	12	09/12/1971	(United States) Embassy Hall, North Bergen, New Jersey	New Jersey Heavyweight Title.
Win	5-1	(Argentina) Reinaldo Raul Gorosito	UD	10	17/11/1971	(United States) Madison Square Garden, New York City, New York	
Win	2-4	(United States) Bob Castle	TKO	5	28/10/1971	(United States) Embassy Hall, North Bergen, New Jersey	
Win	9-5	(United States) Brian O'Melia	PTS	10	17/06/1971	(United States) Embassy Hall, North Bergen, New Jersey	
Win	1-0	(Argentina) Reinaldo Raul Gorosito	PTS	8	13/05/1971	(United States) Embassy Hall, North Bergen, New Jersey	
Win	1-3	(United States) Tony Norris	PTS	10	16/04/1971	(United States) Paterson Armory, Paterson, New Jersey	
Win	2-2	(United States) Jimmy Harris	PTS	8	18/03/1971	(United States) Embassy Hall, North Bergen, New Jersey	
Loss	1-2	(United States) Jimmy Harris	KO	2	18/02/1971	(United States) Embassy Hall, North Bergen, New Jersey	
Win	4-4-2	(Jamaica) Edmund Stewart	PTS	4	17/06/1970	(United States) Madison Square Garden, New York City, New York	
Win	4-3-2	(Jamaica) Edmund Stewart	PTS	8	28/05/1970	(United States) Cliffside Park, New Jersey	
Win	0-9-2	(United States) Sonny Pittman	PTS	8	09/04/1970	(United States) Embassy Hall, North Bergen, New Jersey	
Win	0-4	(Canada) Len Couture	KO	4	19/03/1970	(United States) Embassy Hall, North Bergen, New Jersey	
Win	13-9-3	(United States) Tony Gagliardo	PTS	6	16/02/1970	(United States) Madison Square Garden, New York City, New York	
Win	0-3	(Puerto Rico) Angel Viera	TKO	2	15/01/1970	(United States) Embassy Hall, North Bergen, New Jersey	
Win	1-2	(United States) Junior Wilkerson	PTS	4	12/12/1969	(United States) Madison Square Garden, New York City, New York	
Win	1-1	(United States) Junior Wilkerson	PTS	6	20/11/1969	(United States) Embassy Hall, North Bergen, New Jersey	
Win	0-2	(United States) George Simpson	PTS	6	30/10/1969	(United States) Embassy Hall, North Bergen, New Jersey	
Win	--	(United States) Junior Wilkerson	PTS	4	01/10/1969	(United States) Jersey City Armory, Jersey City, New Jersey	
Win	2-0	(United States) Jeff Marx	KO	1	18/08/1969	(United States) Madison Square Garden, New York City, New York	

== Referee ==
In 1982, he telephoned John Condon (president of Madison Square Garden Boxing) and expressed interest in being a referee. After Condon put in a good word with the New York State Athletic Commission, they started using him as a ringside judge. Before long, he had his first assignment as a referee in a four-round bout at the Felt Forum (a part of Madison Square Garden).

Neumann is now a respected figure within the boxing community and has worked in the ring for 50+ title fights involving champions including Mike Tyson, Wladimir Klitschko, Meldrick Taylor, Buddy McGirt, Chris Byrd, Evander Holyfield, John Ruiz, and many others.

== Writer ==
Neumann wrote an article about a fight that he had against Chuck Wepner in Madison Square Garden that was published in the July 1974 issue of Sport magazine. He wrote 13 columns about boxing for the sports section of the New York Times. He wrote stories of boxing The New York Post, The New York News Magazine, Forbes, Signature, Harper's, New Jersey Monthly and other magazines. In 1988 he began writing a financial column for the Hudson Dispatch. Over the years he has syndicated the column in several newspapers. He wrote another book titled "Fighting for your Financial Future - Round Two".
