= Muhammad Ali vs. Jerry Quarry =

Boxing competition

The Return of the Champion
- Date: October 26, 1970
- Venue: Municipal Auditorium, Atlanta, Georgia
- Title(s) on the line: Lineal heavyweight title

Tale of the tape
Boxer	(United States) Muhammad Ali	(United States) Jerry Quarry
Nickname	"The Greatest"	"Irish"
Hometown	Louisville, Kentucky	Bakersfield, California
Purse	$200,000	$150,000
Pre-fight record	29–0 (23 KO)	37–4–4 (24 KO)
Age	28 years, 9 months	25 years, 5 months
Height	6 ft 3 in (191 cm)	6 ft 0 in (183 cm)
Weight	213 1/2 lb (97 kg)	197 1/2 lb (90 kg)
Style	Orthodox	Orthodox
Recognition	Lineal; Heavyweight Champion	WBA; No. 3 Ranked Heavyweight; The Ring; No. 1 Ranked Heavyweight

Result
- Ali won via 3rd round RTD

Muhammad Ali vs. Jerry Quarry, billed as The Return of the Champion, was a professional boxing match contested on October 26, 1970, for the Lineal heavyweight championship. This was Ali's first fight since his suspension from boxing in 1967.

== Background ==
Muhammad Ali was stripped of his heavyweight titles in 1967 when he faced charges for refusing to be drafted into the Vietnam War. For nearly four years, Ali was banned from the sport, missing out on what could have been the prime of his career, until Georgia granted Ali a boxing license in 1970. Meanwhile, Jerry Quarry had risen through the ranks in the late 1960s, but lost title fights against Joe Frazier and Jimmy Ellis.

== The fight ==
Both fighters were hoping that the victory would be a launchpad to a championship match with Frazier. Ali had accumulated a bit of rust and lost a bit of speed from the years off, but was sharp throughout the match, using his jab to keep Quarry off balance and landing power shots consistently. Quarry grew bolder as the fight went on, and managed to land several shots on the former champion, but suffered a cut over the left eye in the third round, and began to bleed profusely. The fight was stopped by the fight doctor following the end of the third round.

== Aftermath ==
=== Rematch ===
The two fighters rematched less than two years later. The fight would be for the NABF heavyweight title, which Ali now held. Quarry did better this time, lasting much longer, but once again struggled to close the distance with, and hurt Ali, who once again dominated most of the fight from the outside. Quarry was hurt going into the seventh round, and after landing several unanswered shots, Ali signaled to the referee to stop the fight, which he did shortly afterwards.

== Undercard ==
Confirmed bouts:

== Broadcasting ==
Country	Broadcaster
Philippines	ABS-CBN
United Kingdom	BBC

Preceded by vs. Zora Folley	Muhammad Ali's bouts 26 October 1970	Succeeded by vs. Oscar Bonavena
Preceded by vs. Stamford Harris	Jerry Quarry's bouts 26 October 1970	Succeeded by vs. Dick Gosha
