= Tommy Hicks =

American boxer

Tommy Hicks (June 27, 1944 – February 14 2023) is an American former light heavyweight boxer.

== Early life ==
Thomas R. Hicks was born in Lockport, New York. He attended Ithaca College where he played football and wrestled. He graduated in 1966.

== Career ==
Hicks won the Buffalo Golden Gloves tournament in 1965 in the 175 Novice Division, and in 1967 won the Open 175 Division and finished third in the Nationals in Milwaukee.

Hicks began boxing professionally part-time in 1967, while continuing to work as a teacher. Fighting from 1967 to 1974, he won 18 fights, 10 by knockout, while losing 12, 8 by knockout, and drawing 3. On October 30, 1971, Hicks challenged Bob Foster (boxer) for the World Boxing Council Light Heavyweight title at Scranton Pennsylvania. Hicks was stopped in the 8th round.

He was inducted into the Buffalo Boxing Hall of Fame.

Hicks died on February 14, 2023, In Cedar Rapids, Iowa
