= Municipal Auditorium (Atlanta) =

Auditorium in Atlanta, United States

Coordinates: 33°45′13″N 84°23′4″W

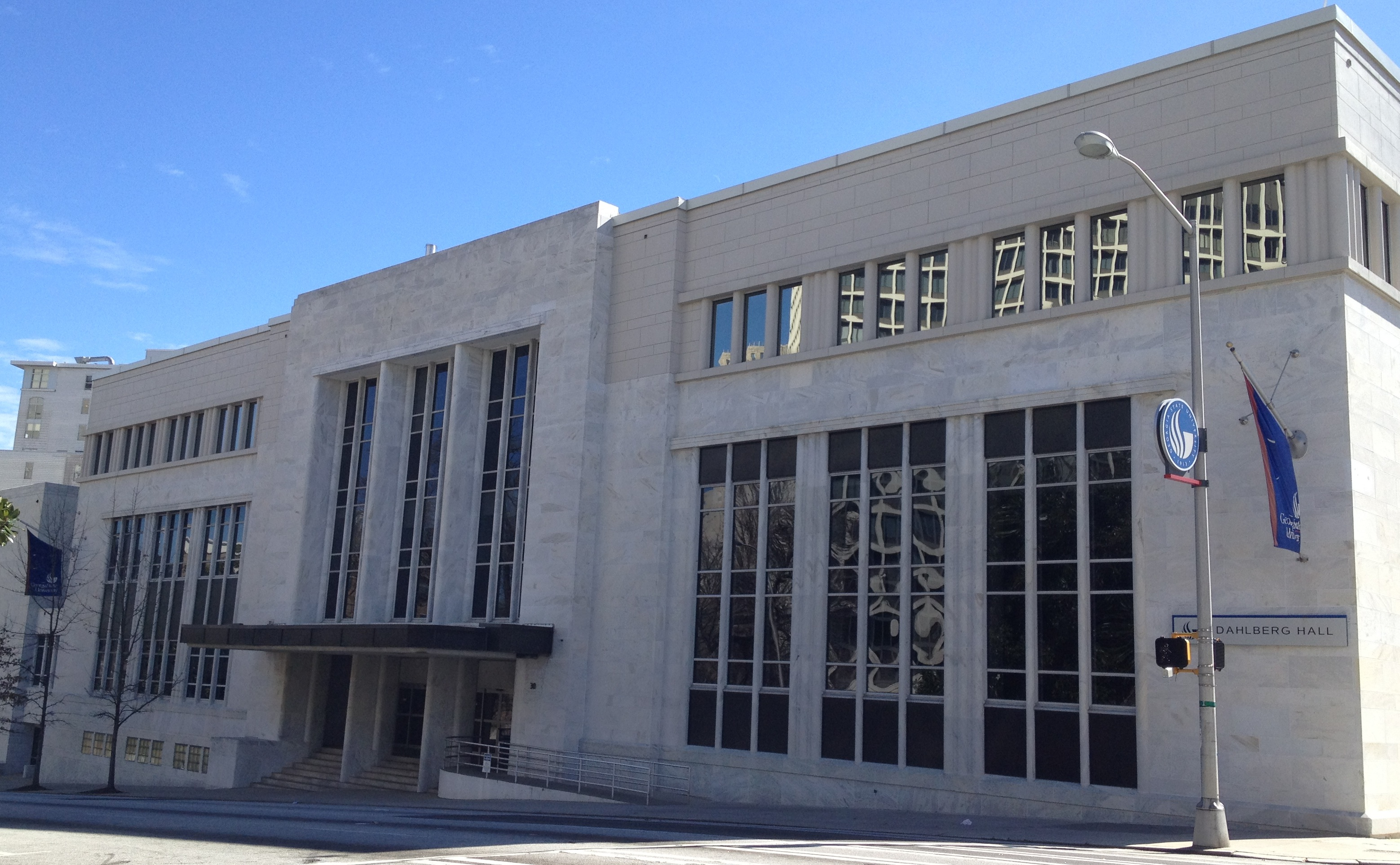
GSU Dahlberg Hall, 2012

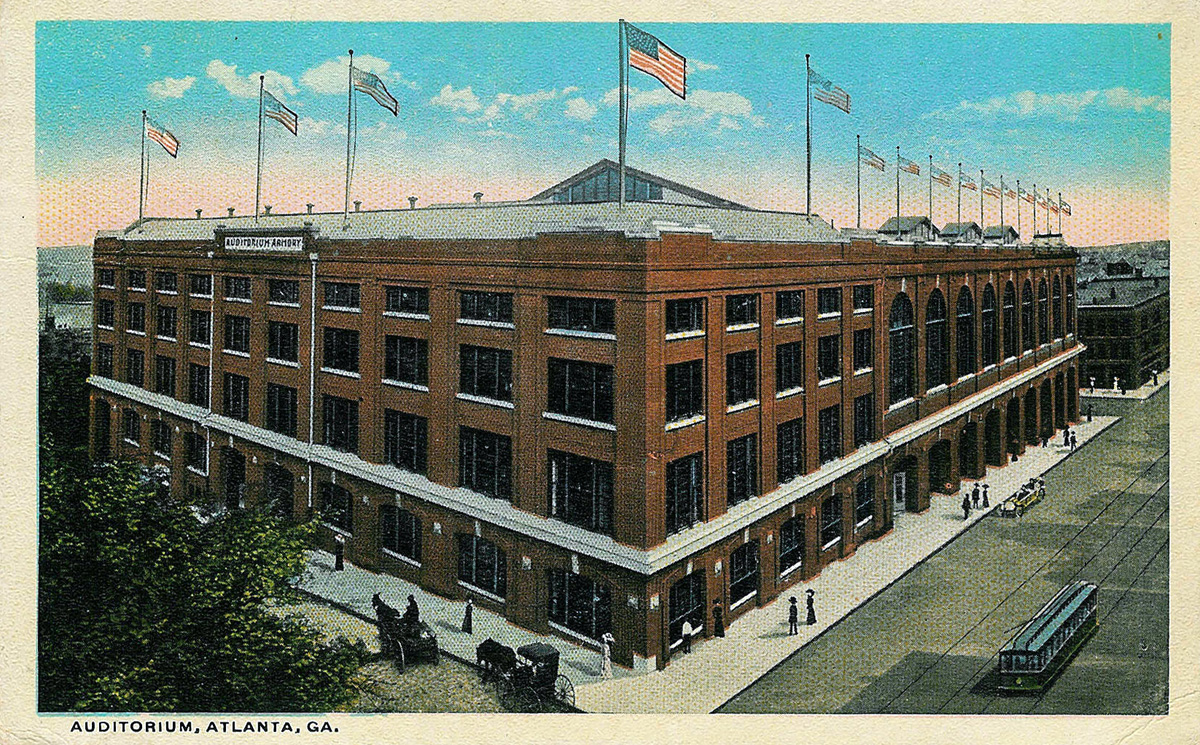
Atlanta Municipal Auditorium with original brick facade

Atlanta Municipal Auditorium, originally known as the Auditorium and Armory, was an auditorium in Atlanta, Georgia, USA. It was constructed with funds raised by a committee of Atlanta citizens and then sold to the city of Atlanta.

The structure was dedicated in a pre-inaugural visit from President William Howard Taft in 1909 during which he was served a possum dinner, and the dining hall in which this event took place was named in his honor. The public dedication of the Auditorium took place with the hosting of the inaugural Atlanta Music Festival in May 1909. The Auditorium and Armory also housed the 179th Field Artillery, who stored munitions there as well as using the space for drills.

Over the years various concerts, theater productions, operas, balls, and professional wrestling matches were hosted at the auditorium, as were the 1922 to 1932 Southern Conference men's basketball tournaments. One additional event of note was the Gone with the Wind Ball, held in conjunction with the 1939 premiere of the film.

The building originally had a red brick facade. After a 1940 fire the original architect, John Robert Dillon, redesigned the exterior and it was rebuilt with a marble facade.

Until Woodruff Arts Center opened, the Municipal Auditorium was the home of the Atlanta Symphony Orchestra.

Prior to the GSU sale the building housed an Austin concert pipe organ, typical of such turn of the century municipal halls (Chattanooga's Soldiers and Sailor's Auditorium still has theirs). It was (poorly) located in the ceiling space above the stage. By around 1970 it was used only two weeks in the Spring when most of the Atlanta High Schools held their graduation ceremonies there. Exactly one piece was played, Elgar's "Pomp and Circumstance". Elton John had a performance there during this time, wearing a red hotpants jumpsuit.

On October 26, 1970, the auditorium hosted the first Muhammad Ali fight in over three years, against Jerry Quarry. Ali had been banned from boxing in over 50 locations due to his refusal to participate in the Vietnam War draft. Atlanta was the first city to offer him a venue to box, effectively breaking the ban.

The building was sold in 1979 to Georgia State University which now uses the structure as their Alumni Hall. On September 17, 2010, Georgia State University renamed their Alumni Hall Dahlberg Hall, after alumnus A. W. "Bill" Dahlberg.

Atlanta Municipal Auditorium is located at Gilmer and Courtland Streets in downtown Atlanta.
