= Valley Music Theater =

Entertainment venue in Los Angeles, California

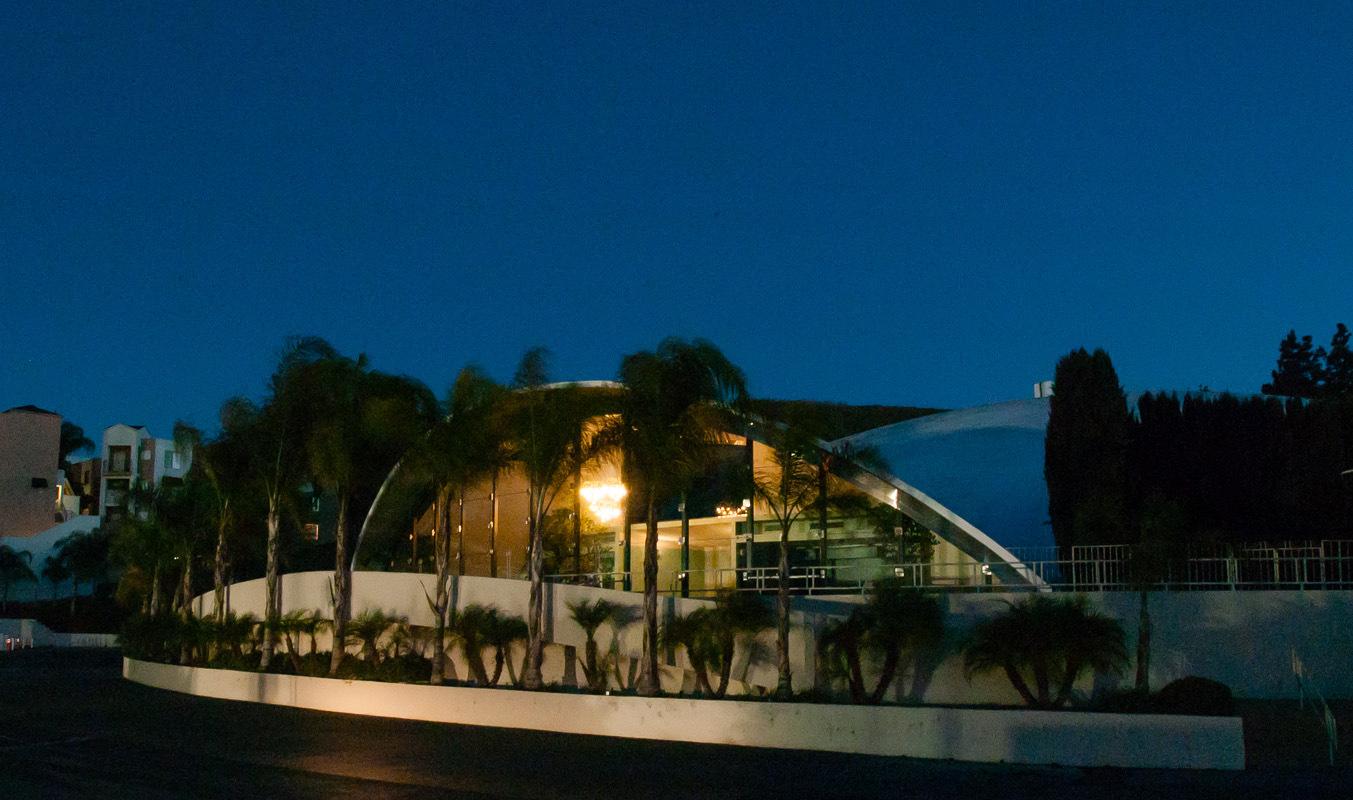
- Valley Music Theater
- Interactive map of the Valley Music Theater area
- Alternative names: Assembly Hall of Jehovah's Witnesses

General information
- Architectural style: Concrete Dome
- Location: Woodland Hills, California
- Coordinates: 34.166389°N 118.581667°W
- Completed: 1963
- Demolished: 2007

Design and construction
- Architect: Thomas Wayne Lindsey
- Architecture firm: Hawkins and Lindsey AIA

Other information
- Seating capacity: 2865

The Valley Music Theater was a theater-in-the-round performing arts hall located in Woodland Hills, Los Angeles, California. It was just south of the Ventura Freeway at 20600 Ventura Boulevard, in the Chalk Hills of the western San Fernando Valley. The modernist style 2,865-seat facility opened in 1964, and was demolished in 2007 by a developer for a condominium project.

== History ==
The Valley Music Theater was built in 1963, as a concrete shell structure, by pouring a concrete 'dome' over a rounded hill of soil, then excavating the soil away. The theater project was backed by entertainers Bob Hope and Art Linkletter, along with businessmen Cy Warner and Randolph Hale.

The 2,865-seat facility opened July 6, 1964 with The Sound of Music. The first year saw the theater mount 18 musicals, three comedies, a drama, as well as concerts with a combined audience of over 600,000.

Among the performers who appeared at the Valley Music Theater were Sammy Davis Jr., Johnny Carson, Don Rickles, Woody Allen, Ray Charles, Art Linkletter, Robert Goulet, Mitzi Gaynor, Eddie Fisher, Ike & Tina Turner, Peter, Paul & Mary, Janis Ian, B.B. King, Lou Rawls, Three Dog Night, Jim Croce, and the Spiral Starecase. The Byrds, Buffalo Springfield, and The Doors appeared there together on February 22, 1967.

It was featured as a music venue in the 1967 film, The Cool Ones.

=== Demise ===
By 1966 the theater began to fall on hard times. Over the years, the fare changed from legitimate theater, to rock concerts, to boxing matches, until in 1970's it became a Jehovah's Witness Regional Assembly Hall. In 1968, the front of the venue was used as a set in the TV series The Invaders on an episode called "Inquisition," where it portrayed the new electronics laboratory of 'Scoville Electronics & Manufacturing Co.' Exterior scenes showed the access road, parking area and main entrance of the building. By 2004, the church had outgrown the facility and sold the property, which it had bought for $1 million, to the developer JPI for $30 million. (LA Assessor's record Document 2014505 show sale at $25 million on 8/05/2004.) On Feb. 2017 The Watchtower requested release of funds from the sale in the amount of $18.6 million from local participating congregation owners. The disparity in the sold amount + interest of ~14 years and funds released of $18.6 in 2017 was not disclosed.

JPI Development of Texas demolished the Valley Music Theater building in 2007, and planned to erect 350 condominiums on the 8.3-acre site. In April 2009, JPI defaulted on its loan of $41.8 million and the property was seized by Bank of America. The current owner is John Stanek of The Jefferson Project who has received preliminary approval May 27, 2011 for a mixed-use development consisting of retail shops and a maximum of 340 dwelling units. The project began in 2012, and remained under construction in 2013.

In 2014, the site at 20600 Ventura Blvd. became The Boulevard Apartment Homes.
