= Albuquerque Civic Auditorium =

Former arena in Albuquerque, NM

Coordinates: 35°05′15″N 106°38′14″W

Albuquerque Civic Auditorium was an indoor arena in Albuquerque, New Mexico. It opened in 1957, and was demolished in 1986. It was notable for its innovative construction, as the dome was created by pouring concrete over a mound of packed earth that was subsequently removed. The auditorium was located east of Downtown on Grand Avenue (now Dr. Martin Luther King Jr. Ave.), between St. Joseph Hospital and Interstate 25. It had a capacity of 6,000 people.

== History ==
The Albuquerque Civic Auditorium was designed by the Albuquerque firm of Ferguson, Stevens and Associates in 1955. Architects Gordon Ferguson and Donald Stevens came up with the idea of using an earthen mound as a form for the poured-in-place concrete dome. An existing hill on the site was built up and shaped to the proper dimensions, followed by a ten-day concrete pour. The earth was then excavated from under the dome to create the arena space. The finished dome was 62 feet (19 m) high, 218 feet (66 m) in diameter, and varied in thickness from 5 inches (13 cm) at the center to 2 feet (61 cm) at the edges. The innovative construction technique garnered a mention in Life and was also praised by Frank Lloyd Wright during a lecture at the University of New Mexico in 1956.

The venue opened on April 27, 1957, with a performance by the Albuquerque Civic Symphony. Over the years the venue hosted a number of notable acts, including Led Zeppelin in 1969, Jimi Hendrix in 1970, just three months before his death, and the Grateful Dead in 1971. It was also the home venue of the University of Albuquerque Dons basketball team from 1963 to 1969. However, the auditorium had poor acoustics and eventually fell from popularity as a music venue in favor of Tingley Coliseum and Popejoy Hall. It was demolished in 1986.
