= Banks (surname) =

Banks is an English toponymic surname for people who lived near hillsides or riverbanks. In Ireland, it is also an Anglicized form of the Irish patronym Ò Bruacháin (descendant of Bruachán), where Bruachán was a nickname for a potbellied person, which got confused with the word bruach (bank). Notable people and fictional characters with the surname include:

== Sports ==
- Adrian Banks (born 1986), American basketball player
- Alan Banks (rugby league) (born c. 1965), rugby league footballer of the 1980s and 1990s
- Antonio Banks (American football) (born 1973), defensive back
- Barbara Banks (1947–2025), English long-distance runner
- Brad Banks (born 1980), American football player
- Caleb Banks (born 2001), American football player
- Carl Banks (born 1962), American football player
- Charlie Banks (rugby league) (1923–2016), Scottish-born Australian rugby league player
- Carrie Banks, American basketball player and coach
- Chip Banks (born 1959), American football player
- Denis Banks (born 1959), Australian rules footballer
- Deonte Banks (born 2001), American football player
- Eric Banks (American football) (born 1998), American football player
- Ernie Banks (1931–2015), American baseball player
- GG Banks (born 2008), American basketball player
- Gordon Banks (1937–2019), English football goalkeeper
- Henry Banks (1914–1994), American racing driver
- Jahmal Banks (born 2001), American football player
- James Banks III (born 1998), American basketball player
- Jeremy Banks (born 1999), American football player
- Johnathon Banks (born 1982), American boxer
- Kelvin Banks Jr. (born 2004), American football player
- Kenny Banks (1923–1994), English footballer
- Keshawn Banks (born 1999), American football player
- M. B. Banks (1883–1970), American football and basketball player and football, basketball and baseball coach
- Marcus Banks (born 1981), American basketball player
- Maud Banks (born 1879 – n.d.), American tennis player
- Maurice Banks (American football) (born 1983), American football coach
- Omari Banks (born 1982), West Indian cricketer
- Percy Banks (1885–1915), English cricketer
- Sasha Banks (born 1992), stage/ring name for professional wrestler Mercedes Kaestner-Varnado
- Sean Banks (born 1985), American basketball player
- Sevyn Banks (born 1999), American football player
- Shad Banks Jr. (born 2003), American football player
- Sonny Banks (1940–1965), American boxer
- Steve Banks (footballer) (born 1972), English football goalkeeper
- Tavian Banks (born 1974), American footballer
- Tom Banks (American football) (born 1948), American footballer
- Tommy Banks (footballer) (1929–2024), English footballer (Bolton Wanderers)
- Tony Banks (American football) (born 1973), American football quarterback
- Vic Banks (1889–1972), rugby league footballer from New Zealander of the 1910s
- Willie Banks (born 1956), American track athlete
- Willie Banks (baseball) (born 1969), American baseball player
- Yam Banks (born 2002), American football player
- Zach Banks (born 1997), American race car driver

== Politics ==
- Caleb Banks (politician) (1659–1696), English politician, member of the House of Commons
- Charles Arthur Banks (1885–1961), Lieutenant-Governor of British Columbia
- Dennis Banks (1932–2017), Native American activist and writer
- Gladys E. Banks (1897–1972), New York politician
- Gordon Banks (politician) (born 1955), British politician
- Hal C. Banks (1909–1985), Canadian labour leader
- Jim Banks (born 1979), American Congressman representing Indiana
- John Banks (New Zealand politician) (born 1946), Mayor of Auckland, New Zealand
- J. B. Banks (1924–2003), American politician
- Laurence H. Banks (1897–1972), American politician
- Nathaniel P. Banks (1816–1894), American politician and Union General during the American Civil War
- Rosemary Banks (born 1951), New Zealand's ambassador to France
- Tommy Banks (musician) (1936–2018), Canadian musician and politician
- Tony Banks, Baron Stratford (1943–2006), British Labour politician
- Victor Banks (born 1947), Anguillan politician

== Arts and entertainment ==
=== Writing ===
- Carolyn Banks (born 1941), American novelist
- Emma Dunning Banks (1856–1931), American actress, dramatic reader, teacher, and writer
- Catherine Banks, Canadian playwright
- Charles Eugene Banks (1852–1932), American writer and newspaper editor
- Charles L. Banks (1914–1988), United States Marine Corps general
- Chris Banks (poet) (born 1970), Canadian poet
- Enoch Marvin Banks (1877–1911), American historian and educator
- George Linnaeus Banks (1821–1881), British writer
- Iain Banks (1954–2013), Scottish novelist
- Isabella Varley Banks (1821–1897), British novelist (married to George Linnaeus Banks)
- Leanne Banks (born 1959), American novelist
- Leslie Esdaile Banks (1959–2011), American novelist
- Mary Ross Banks (1846–1910), American litterateur and author
- Michael A. Banks (1951–2023), American science fiction writer
- Russell Banks (1940–2023), American novelist

=== Music ===
- Aidan Banks, bass guitarist
- Aimee Banks (born 2002), Irish soprano
- Ant Banks (born 1969), American rapper
- Azealia Banks (born 1991), American singer/rapper
- Bankie Banx (born 1953, birth name Clement Ashley Banks), Anguillan musician
- Bessie Banks (born 1938), American soul singer
- Chico Banks (1962–2008), American Chicago blues guitarist and singer
- Durk Banks (born 1992), American rapper and singer known professionally as Lil Durk
- Erica Banks (born 1998), American rapper
- Jillian Banks, American singer, and songwriter known as Banks (born 1988)
- Larry Banks (1931–1992), American soul singer, songwriter and record producer
- Lloyd Banks (born 1982), American rapper
- L.V. Banks (1932–2011), American blues guitarist, singer and songwriter
- Mike Banks (musician), techno musician
- Ms Banks (born 1994), British rapper
- Nick Banks (born 1965), British drummer and businessman
- Paul Banks (American singer) (born 1978), English-American singer and guitarist (Interpol)
- Paul Banks (English musician) (born 1973), British songwriter and guitarist (Shed Seven, The Rising and Albion)
- Peter Banks (1947–2013), English guitarist
- Tony Banks (musician) (born 1950), British songwriter and keyboardist (Genesis)

=== Film ===
- Asha Banks (born 2003), English actress and singer
- Briana Banks (born 1978), American pornographic actress
- Elizabeth Banks (born 1974), American actress
- Jonathan Banks (born 1947), American actor
- Leslie Banks (1890–1952), British actor and director
- Lionel Banks (1901–1950), American art director
- Monty Banks (1887–1950), comedian and film director
- Morwenna Banks, British actress and comedian
- Robert Banks (filmmaker) (Robert C. Banks Jr.) (born 1966), American filmmaker
- Steven Banks, American comedian, actor and screenwriter

=== Other ===
- Darryl Banks, comics artist
- Doug Banks (1958–2016), American radio personality
- Lesley Banks (born 1962), British artist
- Michele Banks, artist
- Nancy Banks-Smith (born 1929), British television critic
- Robin Banks (born 1972), radio DJ and TV presenter in the UK
- Thomas Banks (sculptor) (1735–1805), English sculptor
- Timothy Banks, American illustrator
- Violet Banks (1896–1985), Scottish artist

== Science and technology ==
- Edgar James Banks (1866–1945), American archeologist
- Edward Banks (naturalist) (1903–1988), British naturalist and museum curator
- Francis Rodwell Banks (1898–1985), British engineer and fuel specialist
- Harlan Parker Banks (1913–1998), American paleobotanist
- James Arthur Banks (1897–1967), British civil engineer
- Sir Joseph Banks (1743–1820), English naturalist
- Karen Banks, computer networking expert
- Kirsten Banks, Australian astrophysicist and science communicator
- Nathan Banks (1868–1953), American entomologist
- Richard C. Banks (1931–2021), American ornithologist
- Robert Banks (chemist) (1921–1989), American research chemist
- Sarah Gertrude Banks (1839–1926), American physician and suffragist
- Tom Banks (physicist) (born 1949), American physicist

== Other ==
- Aaron Banks (disambiguation), multiple people
- Charles C. Banks (1893–1971), British World War I flying ace
- David Banks (disambiguation), multiple people
- Edward Banks (disambiguation), multiple people
- George Banks (spree killer) (1942–2025), American convicted murderer
- Heide Banks, psychotherapist, celebrity relationship expert
- Mary MacLeod Banks (1861–1951), folklorist
- Mateo Banks (1872–1949), Argentine spree killer
- Sir Maurice Banks (1901–1991), British businessman
- Mike Banks (mountaineer) (1922–2013), British mountain climber
- Nathaniel P. Banks (1816–1894), American Civil War Union general
- Ridgway Banks, American inventor
- Tom Banks (disambiguation), multiple people
- Tyra Banks (born 1973), American supermodel
- William Mitchell Banks (1842–1904), Scottish surgeon
- William Banks (barrister) (1719–1763)

== Fictional characters ==
- Adam Banks, in the film The Mighty Ducks
- Inspector Alan Banks, in the crime novels of Peter Robinson
- Charlie Banks (One Life to Live), from the American soap opera One Life to Live
- Clifford Banks, in the TV series Murder One
- Rosie M. Banks, a recurring character in stories by author P. G. Wodehouse
- Alfie Banks, the main protagonist of the graphic adventure game A Golden Wake
- Tom Banks (EastEnders), from the British soap opera EastEnders
- Jared Banks, from One Life to Live
- Joe Banks, title character of the film Joe Versus the Volcano, played by Tom Hanks
- Natalie Banks, from One Life to Live
- Victoria Lord Banks, fictional character form One Life to Live
- Banks, a family on the television series The Fresh Prince of Bel-Air
- The Banks family in Mary Poppins (book series), children's books by P. L. Travers, and the film and musical based upon them

== See also ==
- Bank (surname)
- Banksia (disambiguation)
