= Bank (surname) =

Bank is a surname. Notable people with the surname include:

- Floyd Bank, American former basketball coach
- Frank Bank (1942–2013), American actor
- István Bank (born 1984), Hungarian footballer
- Jan Bank (born 1940), Dutch historian
- Jesper Bank (born 1957), Danish sailor
- Joshua Bank, Russian writer and rabbi
- Lawrence C. Bank, American engineer
- Linda Bank (born 1986), Dutch swimmer
- Melissa Bank (1960–2022), American writer
- Ondřej Bank (born 1980), Czech alpine skier
- Zsuzsa Bánk (born 1965), German writer

== See also ==
- Banks (surname)
