= Gregorio Peralta =

Argentine boxer (1935–2001)

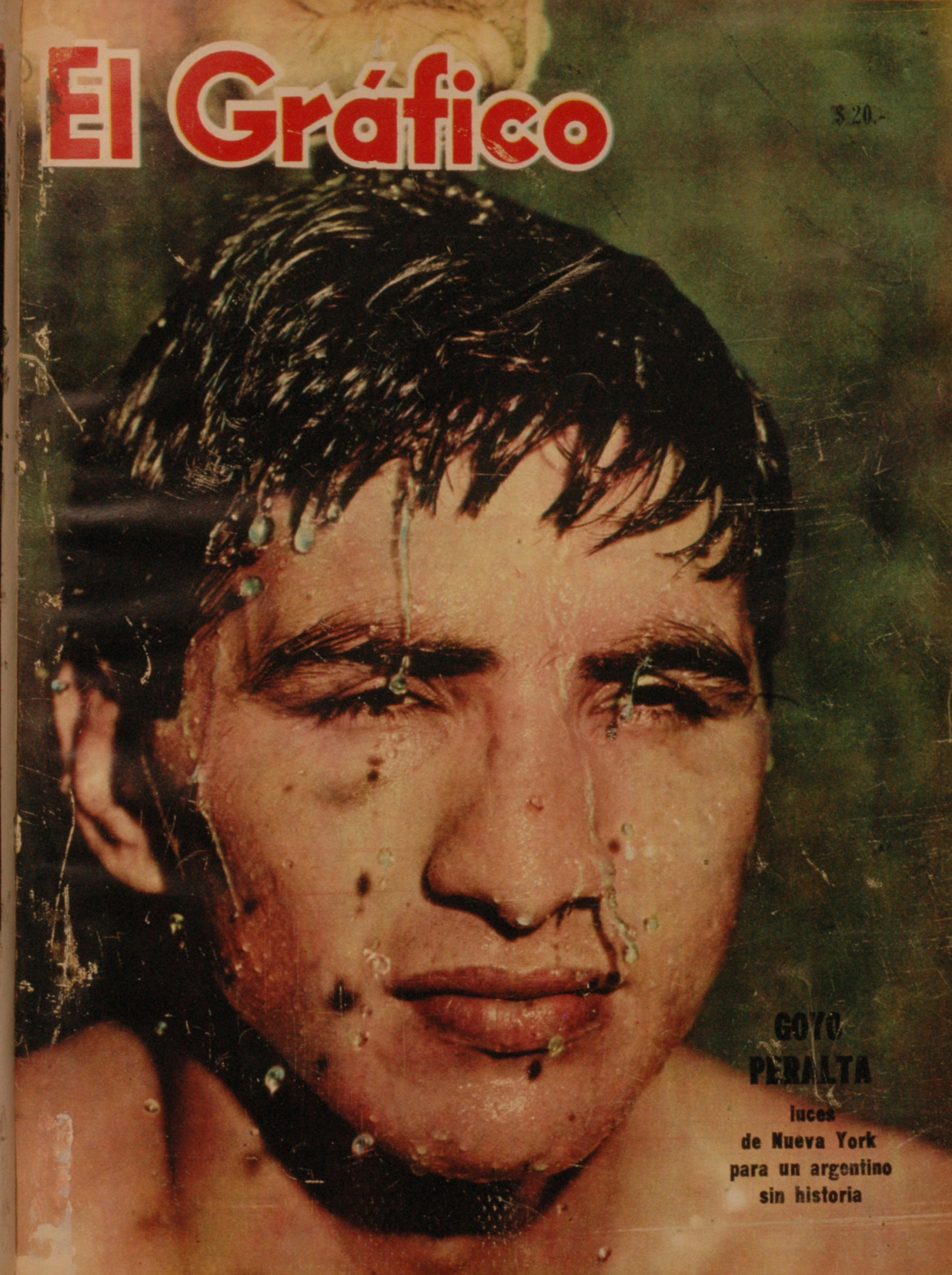

Personal information
- Nickname: Goyo
- Born: Gregorio Manuel Peralta; May 8, 1935 San Juan, Argentina
- Died: October 3, 2001 (aged 66)
- Height: 6 ft 0 in (1.83 m)
- Weight: Heavyweight

Boxing career
- Reach: 77 in (196 cm)
- Stance: Orthodox

Boxing record
- Total fights: 116
- Wins: 98
- Win by KO: 60
- Losses: 9
- Draws: 9

Gregorio Manuel Peralta (May 8, 1935 – October 3, 2001), better known as Gregorio "Goyo" Peralta, was a top Argentine boxer. Peralta enjoyed success as both a light heavyweight and a heavyweight, one of a small group Latin American Heavyweights to attain world-class status. (John Ruiz and later Andy Ruiz are the only Hispanics to be world Heavyweight champion in boxing history.) Greg Peralta was a popular performer during the 1950s, 1960s and 1970s.

== Biography ==
Gregorio Peralta was born in San Juan. He later resided in the area of Rosario, in Santa Fe Province.

On April 5, 1958, he made his professional boxing debut, knocking out a rival (Rene Pereira) who had lost all fourteen of his bouts. Peralta's fourth-round knockout of Pereira was at the legendary Luna Park, in Buenos Aires.

Peralta won his first five fights by knockout, then went the ten round distance for the first time on September 6 of that same year, against Jose Angel Manzur, whom he outpointed over ten rounds in Montevideo, Uruguay. His first fight abroad had already been held, when he beat Marcelo Farias by a second-round knockout 35 days before, also at Montevideo.

On October 22, he and Manzur had a rematch, with the two boxers drawing (tying) after ten more rounds.

On March 31, 1959, Peralta suffered his first loss as a professional, a ten-round decision defeat to then reigning South American light heavyweight champion Luis Ignacio in São Paulo, Brazil in a non-title bout. Peralta had one loss and two draws in his next three fights, but then he returned to winning, when he avenged his defeat against Ignacio by knocking him out in three rounds, August 23 in Brazil.

After winning his next five fights, including four in Uruguay, Peralta faced Mauro Mina, in a widely expected light heavyweight bout between two South Americans. On June 15, 1960, Peralta was knocked out by Mina in eight rounds at Lima, Peru.

Peralta then won twelve and drew one of his next thirteen bouts. Among those were a ten-round decision in a rubber match with Manzur, and a four-round disqualification win over Aurelio Diaz. Peralta was given his first chance at winning a belt when he fought Jose Giorgetti, on August 4, 1962, at Mar del Plata for the Argentine Heavyweight title. He won the national belt by outpointing Giorgetti over twelve rounds, and then won fifteen more bouts in a row, for a total of 24 victories and one draw in twenty-five bouts.

== Beats Pastrano ==
The biggest win of his career came during that streak, when he outpointed world light heavyweight champion Willie Pastrano over ten rounds at Miami, Florida on September 20, 1963, in a non-title bout. His first fight with Pastrano marked Peralta's United States debut as a professional boxer.

== Pastrano – light heavyweight title ==
Peralta's next fight, on November 15 of that year, was also his first bout at New York's Madison Square Garden. He beat future José Torres world championship challenger, Wayne Thornton, by a ten-round decision there. After two more wins, including another one over Thornton, Peralta was given a shot at Pastrano's world Light-Heavyweight title, on April 10, 1964, in New Orleans, Louisiana. Pastrano retained the championship with a sixth-round knockout in a fight that had different views from boxing magazines; while the general consensus is that Pastrano was actually winning the fight when it was stopped, Ring En Español actually claimed twenty years later that Peralta was hitting Pastrano and had him against the ropes when the referee intervened and raised Pastrano's arm as the fight's winner. The truth is a cut opened in the second Thornton fight re-opened during Peralta's challenge of Pastrano and the bout was, to some hastily, to others justifiably, halted.

== Bonavena takes Argentine title ==
Peralta went on to win nine of his next ten fights, including a rematch victory over Mauro Mina, outpointed in ten rounds at Buenos Aires on September 19 of '64, before defending his Argentine Heavyweight title for the first time, and losing it, to Oscar Bonavena by a twelve-round decision on September 4, 1965, in Buenos Aires. They'd rematch four years later.

Peralta then went undefeated over his next 32 bouts, building a record of twenty nine wins and three draws, with seventeen knockouts over that span. Among the highlights of those thirty two bouts were three ninth round disqualifications in a row (over Ron Marsh on March 11, 1968, and two over Felipe Pablo Marich, on April 5 and April 20 of that same year), a ten-round decision over Ramón Rocha on August 23, and a draw in a non-title rematch with Bonavena, held on August 8, 1969.

== Foreman ==
After the Bonavena rematch, Peralta faced George Foreman in a fight that was televised in the United States, on February 16, 1970, once again at Madison Square Garden. With a new fighting weight around 200 lbs (90 kg), Peralta had earlier left the light-heavyweight scene. Foreman was the rising ex-Olympic star and Peralta, then ranked 9th world contender, was predicted to be his biggest test to date. Foreman held an aura as an awesome knockout artist but Peralta doggedly went ten full rounds with the future two-time world Heavyweight champion. He lost a unanimous decision to Foreman. But Peralta's boxing skill and mobility showed that Foreman was open to fast well-placed counters and that he could weaken late in a fight. It's thought Muhammad Ali studied this fight in preparation for his legendary 'Rumble in the Jungle' victory.

Peralta's next bout came when he beat future world Light Heavyweight title challenger Piero del Papa, by a fifth-round knockout on June 6 at Montevideo.

His next bout marked his European debut, when he defeated Herbert Wick, exactly sixteen days after the fight with del Papa, by a second-round knockout in Barcelona, Spain. Peralta had three consecutive bouts in Spain, winning each of by knockout.

== Foreman rematch ==
After two more wins, he faced Foreman again, at Oakland, California, this time with the NABF's vacant regional Heavyweight title on the line. Once again, Peralta fought ten rounds with Foreman, but he was knocked out in the tenth, on May 10, 1971.

Peralta then moved to Spain for a one year. With the exception of a victory over Gerhard Zech on December 3 over at Germany, Peralta fought nine of his next ten bouts in Spain. These included a ten-round win over perennial contender Jose Urtain on October 8, a win over Leroy Caldwell by a fourth-round knockout on February 2, 1972, and a ten-round decision loss to Bob Foster world Light Heavyweight title challenger Ray Anderson on June 9 of that same year.

== Ron Lyle twice ==
After the loss to Anderson, Peralta moved to Germany and won his next six bouts by knockout. A 10-round loss by decision to top world title contender Ron Lyle, however, took place on May 12, 1973, at Denver, Colorado.

Peralta won his next two bouts by knockout in Germany, and then in a rematch held Lyle to a ten-round draw in Frankfurt, Germany. Peralta aged 38 years retired for good after the match.

Gregorio Peralta's record contained 98 wins, 9 defeats and 9 draws as a professional boxer, with 60 knockout wins, which places him in the group of boxers that won fifty or more fights by knockout during their careers.

He led a quiet life after retiring, dying on October 3, 2001.

== Professional boxing record ==
98 Wins (60 knockouts), 9 Losses (3 knockouts), 9 Draws
| Res. | Record | Opponent | Type | Round Time | Date | Location | Notes |
| Draw | 98–9–9 | (United States) Ron Lyle | PTS | 10 | 1973–11–17 | (Germany) Frankfurt, Hesse | |
| Win | 98–9–8 | (United States) Johnny Griffin | KO | 5 (10) | 1973–10–26 | (Germany) Cologne, North Rhine-Westphalia | |
| Win | 97–9–8 | (England) Billy Aird | TKO | 4 (10) | 1973–09–21 | (Germany) Hamburg | |
| Loss | 96–9–8 | (United States) Ron Lyle | PTS | 10 | 1973–05–12 | (United States) Denver Coliseum, Denver, Colorado | |
| Win | 96–8–8 | (Mali) Ba Sounkalo | TKO | 10 (10) | 1973–04–06 | (Germany) Hamburg | |
| Win | 95–8–8 | (United States) Ronnie Wright | KO | 6 (10) | 1973–02–16 | (Germany) Sporthalle, Cologne, North Rhine-Westphalia | |
| Win | 94–8–8 | (Germany) Horst Benedens | KO | 3 (10) | 1972–12–08 | (Germany) Cologne, North Rhine-Westphalia | |
| Win | 93–8–8 | (Germany) Arno Prick | KO | 3 (10) | 1972–11–24 | (Germany) Hamburg | |
| Win | 92–8–8 | (Germany) Conny Venselek | TKO | 4 (10) | 1972–10–13 | (Germany) Hamburg | |
| Win | 91–8–8 | (Canada) Bill Drover | TKO | 6 (10) | 1972–09–15 | (Spain) Barcelona, Catalonia | |
| Loss | 90–8–8 | (United States) Ray Anderson | PTS | 10 | 1972–06–09 | (Spain) Madrid, Community of Madrid | |
| Win | 90–7–8 | (United States) Willie Johnson | KO | 2 (10) | 1972–03–18 | (Spain) Valencia, Valencian Community | |
| Win | 89–7–8 | (United States) Leroy Caldwell | KO | 4 (10) | 1972–03–03 | (Spain) Madrid, Community of Madrid | |
| Win | 88–7–8 | (United States) Vernon McIntosh | TKO | 8 (10) | 1972–02–02 | (Spain) Bilbao, Basque Country | |
| Win | 87–7–8 | (Antigua and Barbuda) Rocky Campbell | TKO | 3 (10) | 1971–12–07 | (Spain) Madrid, Community of Madrid | |
| Win | 86–7–8 | (Germany) Gerhard Zech | KO | 8 (10) | 1971–12–03 | (Germany) Frankfurt, Hesse | |
| Win | 85–7–8 | (Spain) José Manuel Urtain | TKO | 8 (10); 2:15 | 1971–10–08 | (Spain) Palacio de Deportes, Madrid, Community of Madrid | |
| Win | 84–7–8 | (Venezuela) Danny Machado | KO | 1 (10) | 1971–09–10 | (Spain) Plaza de Toros de Bilbao, Bilbao, Basque Country | |
| Win | 83–7–8 | Jesse Billy Crown | KO | 1 (10); 0:30 | 1971–07–16 | (Spain) Campo del Gas, Madrid, Community of Madrid | |
| Loss | 82–7–8 | (United States) George Foreman | TKO | 10 (15) | 1971–05–10 | (United States) Oakland Coliseum Arena, Oakland, California | For vacant NABF Heavyweight title. |
| Win | 82–6–8 | (Argentina) Humberto Ghiotti | KO | 2 (10) | 1971–03–06 | (Argentina) Coronel Pringles, Buenos Aires | |
| Win | 81–6–8 | (Italy) Alfredo Vogrig | TKO | 5 (10) | 1970–12–18 | (Spain) Palacio de Deportes, Madrid, Community of Madrid | |
| Win | 80–6–8 | (England) Roger Tighe | TKO | 8 (10) | 1970–09–01 | (Spain) Bilbao, Basque Country | |
| Win | 79–6–8 | (Germany) Herbert Wick | KO | 3 (10) | 1970–06–22 | (Spain) Barcelona, Catalonia | |
| Win | 78–6–8 | (Italy) Piero del Papa | RTD | 5 (10) | 1970–06–06 | (Uruguay) Montevideo, Montevideo | |
| Loss | 77–6–8 | (United States) George Foreman | UD | 10 | 1970–02–16 | (United States) Madison Square Garden, New York City | |
| Draw | 77–5–8 | (Argentina) Oscar Bonavena | PTS | 10 | 1969–08–08 | (Uruguay) Palacio Peñarol, Montevideo, Montevideo | |
| Win | 77–5–7 | (Argentina) José Menno | PTS | 10 | 1969–01–15 | (Argentina) Estadio Bristol, Mar del Plata, Buenos Aires | |
| Win | 76–5–7 | (Argentina) José Menno | PTS | 10 | 1968–12–27 | (Argentina) Mar del Plata, Buenos Aires | |
| Win | 75–5–7 | (Argentina) Marcelo Garnica | KO | 3 (10) | 1968–12–07 | (Argentina) Mar del Plata, Buenos Aires | |
| Win | 74–5–7 | (Argentina) René Sosa | KO | 4 (10) | 1968–11–15 | (Argentina) Estadio Norte, Rosario, Santa Fe | |
| Win | 73–5–7 | (Argentina) Francisco Ramos | TKO | 5 (10) | 1968–11–10 | (Argentina) Club Córdoba, Corrientes, Corrientes | |
| Win | 72–5–7 | (Argentina) Hugo Daniele | TKO | 7 (10) | 1968–10–19 | (Argentina) Club Pacífico, Neuquén, Neuquén | |
| Win | 71–5–7 | (Argentina) Roberto Veliz | KO | 2 (10) | 1968–10–04 | (Argentina) Trelew, Chubut | |
| Win | 70–5–7 | (United States) Dick Hall | PTS | 10 | 1968–09–14 | (Argentina) Luna Park, Buenos Aires | |
| Win | 69–5–7 | (Argentina) Ramón Rocha | PTS | 10 | 1968–08–23 | (Argentina) Rosario, Santa Fe | |
| Win | 68–5–7 | (Argentina) Miguel Angel Paez | PTS | 10 | 1968–08–10 | (Argentina) Luna Park, Buenos Aires | |
| Win | 67–5–7 | (Germany) Kurt Luedecke | TKO | 4 (10) | 1968–07–05 | (Argentina) San Rafael, Mendoza | |
| Draw | 66–5–7 | (Italy) Vittorio Saraudi | PTS | 10 | 1968–05–05 | (Argentina) Luna Park, Buenos Aires | |
| Win | 66–5–6 | (Argentina) Felipe Marich | DQ | 9 (10) | 1968–04–20 | (Argentina) San Juan, San Juan | |
| Win | 65–5–6 | (Argentina) Felipe Marich | DQ | 9 (10) | 1968–04–05 | (Argentina) La Rioja, La Rioja | |
| Win | 64–5–6 | (Argentina) Ron Marsh | DQ | 9 (10) | 1968–03–11 | (Argentina) San Juan, San Juan | |
| Win | 63–5–6 | (Argentina) Carlos Paez | TKO | 3 (10) | 1968–03–08 | (Argentina) Río Cuarto, Córdoba | |
| Draw | 62–5–6 | (United States) Chuck Leslie | PTS | 10 | 1967–12–20 | (Argentina) Luna Park, Buenos Aires | |
| Win | 62–5–5 | (Argentina) Felipe Marich | TKO | 4 (10) | 1967–11–24 | (Argentina) Córdoba, Córdoba | |
| Win | 61–5–5 | (United States) Chuck Leslie | PTS | 10 | 1967–11–12 | (Argentina) Buenos Aires | |
| Win | 60–5–5 | (Argentina) Justo Benitez | TKO | 5 (10) | 1967–10–21 | (Argentina) Luna Park, Buenos Aires | |
| Win | 59–5–5 | (Argentina) José Menno | UD | 10 | 1967–10–07 | (Argentina) Luna Park, Buenos Aires | |
| Win | 58–5–5 | (Argentina) René Sosa | TKO | 6 (10) | 1967–09–15 | (Argentina) Trelew, Chubut | |
| Win | 57–5–5 | (Argentina) Angel Ludueña | KO | 4 (10) | 1967–08–18 | (Argentina) Cipolletti, Río Negro | |
| Win | 56–5–5 | (Argentina) Hugo Daniele | TKO | 6 (10) | 1967–08–04 | (Argentina) Bahía Blanca, Buenos Aires | |
| Win | 55–5–5 | (Argentina) Andrés Selpa | UD | 10 | 1967–07–15 | (Argentina) Luna Park, Buenos Aires | |
| Win | 54–5–5 | (Argentina) Hugo Daniele | PTS | 10 | 1967–07–01 | (Argentina) Estadio Parque de Mayo, San Juan, San Juan | |
| Win | 53–5–5 | (Argentina) Carlos Vazquez | KO | 3 (10) | 1967–06–09 | (Argentina) Boxing Club, Río Gallegos, Santa Cruz | |
| Win | 52–5–5 | (Argentina) Alberto Hergerseimer | KO | 3 (10) | 1967–05–28 | (Argentina) Saavedra, Buenos Aires | |
| Win | 51–5–5 | (Argentina) Hugo Daniele | PTS | 10 | 1967–05–19 | (Argentina) Córdoba, Córdoba | |
| Win | 50–5–5 | (Argentina) Carlos Paez | KO | 3 (10) | 1967–05–05 | (Argentina) Salón de los Deportes, Bahía Blanca, Buenos Aires | |
| Win | 49–5–5 | (Argentina) René Sosa | KO | 5 (10) | 1966–11–05 | (Argentina) Azul, Buenos Aires | |
| Loss | 48–5–5 | (Argentina) Oscar Bonavena | UD | 12 | 1965–09–04 | (Argentina) Luna Park, Buenos Aires | Lost Argentine Heavyweight title. |
| Win | 48–4–5 | (Argentina) René Sosa | KO | 3 (10) | 1965–08–06 | (Argentina) Córdoba, Córdoba | |
| Win | 47–4–5 | (Argentina) Miguel Angel Paez | PTS | 10 | 1965–07–10 | (Argentina) Mar del Plata, Buenos Aires | |
| Win | 46–4–5 | (Argentina) René Sosa | KO | 3 (10) | 1965–06–01 | (Argentina) Córdoba, Córdoba | |
| Draw | 45–4–5 | (Argentina) Miguel Angel Paez | PTS | 10 | 1965–05–24 | (Argentina) Mar del Plata, Buenos Aires | |
| Win | 45–4–4 | (Cuba) Lino Armenteros | TKO | 6 (10) | 1965–05–08 | (Argentina) Buenos Aires | |
| Win | 44–4–4 | (Argentina) Aníbal Córdoba | PTS | 10 | 1965–03–27 | (Argentina) Tapalqué, Buenos Aires | |
| Win | 43–4–4 | (Peru) Mauro Mina | UD | 10 | 1964–09–20 | (Argentina) Luna Park, Buenos Aires | |
| Win | 42–4–4 | (Argentina) Pablo Sagrispanti | TKO | 5 (10) | 1964–09–05 | (Argentina) Rivadavia, Mendoza | |
| Win | 41–4–4 | (Uruguay) Juan Morales | TKO | 3 (10) | 1964–08–22 | (Uruguay) Palacio Peñarol, Montevideo, Montevideo | |
| Win | 40–4–4 | (Peru) Roberto Davila | PTS | 15 | 1964–07–18 | (Argentina) Luna Park, Buenos Aires | Won South American Heavyweight titles. |
| Loss | 39–4–4 | (United States) Willie Pastrano | TKO | 5 (15); 3:00 | 1964–04–10 | (United States) Municipal Auditorium, New Orleans, Louisiana | For WBA and WBC; Light heavyweight titles. |
| Win | 39–3–4 | (United States) Wayne Thornton | UD | 10 | 1964–01–24 | (United States) Madison Square Garden, New York City | |
| Win | 38–3–4 | (Argentina) Telmo Gonzalez | KO | 2 (10) | 1963–12–21 | (Argentina) Azul, Buenos Aires | |
| Win | 37–3–4 | (United States) Wayne Thornton | SD | 10 | 1963–11–15 | (United States) Madison Square Garden, New York City | |
| Win | 36–3–4 | (United States) Willie Pastrano | UD | 10 | 1963–09–20 | (United States) Miami Beach Auditorium, Miami Beach, Florida | |
| Win | 35–3–4 | (Argentina) Telmo Gonzalez | KO | 1 (10) | 1963–08–02 | (Argentina) Río Gallegos, Santa Cruz | |
| Win | 34–3–4 | (Argentina) Justo Benitez | TKO | 6 (10) | 1963–07–05 | (Argentina) Río Gallegos, Santa Cruz | |
| Win | 33–3–4 | (Argentina) Justo Benitez | PTS | 10 | 1963–05–03 | San Juan, Argentina | |
| Win | 32–3–4 | (Argentina) Guillermo Dutschmann | TKO | 9 (10) | 1963–04–13 | (Argentina) Buenos Aires | |
| Win | 31–3–4 | (Argentina) Justo Benitez | PTS | 10 | 1963–02–22 | Estadio Julio Mocoroa, San Juan, Argentina | |
| Win | 30–3–4 | (Argentina) Alfredo Yacanto | PTS | 10 | 1963–02–01 | San Juan, Argentina | |
| Win | 29–3–4 | (Argentina) Pablo Sagrispanti | PTS | 10 | 1963–01–25 | San Juan, Argentina | |
| Win | 28–3–4 | (Argentina) Jorge Tissera | KO | 3 (10) | 1962–12–21 | San Juan, Argentina | |
| Win | 27–3–4 | (Argentina) Rodolfo Diaz | PTS | 10 | 1962–12–02 | (Argentina) Buenos Aires | |
| Win | 26–3–4 | (Argentina) Justo Benitez | PTS | 10 | 1962–11–03 | (Argentina) Buenos Aires | |
| Win | 25–3–4 | (Argentina) Justo Benitez | PTS | 12 | 1962–09–19 | (Argentina) Luna Park, Buenos Aires | Retained Argentine Heavyweight title. |
| Win | 24–3–4 | (Argentina) José Giorgetti | PTS | 12 | 1962–08–04 | (Argentina) Mar del Plata, Buenos Aires | Won Argentine Heavyweight title. |
| Win | 23–3–4 | (Argentina) Antonio Diaz | PTS | 10 | 1962–06–16 | (Argentina) Mar del Plata, Buenos Aires | |
| Win | 22–3–4 | (Argentina) Carlos Paiva | KO | 5 (10) | 1962–05–18 | (Argentina) Azul, Buenos Aires Province | |
| Win | 21–3–4 | (Argentina) José Giorgetti | UD | 10 | 1962–04–14 | (Argentina) Estadio Bristo, Mar del Plata, Buenos Aires | |
| Win | 20–3–4 | (Argentina) Andres Villalba | TKO | 3 (10) | 1962–03–02 | (Argentina) Tapalqué, Buenos Aires | |
| Win | 19–3–4 | (Argentina) Aurelio Diaz | DQ | 4 (10) | 1961–12–15 | (Argentina) Azul, Buenos Aires Province | |
| Win | 18–3–4 | (Argentina) Pablo Sagrispanti | PTS | 10 | 1961–11–24 | (Argentina) Azul, Buenos Aires Province | |
| Win | 17–3–4 | (Argentina) José Angel Mazur | PTS | 10 | 1961–10–25 | (Argentina) Buenos Aires | |
| Win | 16–3–4 | (Argentina) Antonio Diaz | PTS | 10 | 1961–09–15 | (Argentina) Azul, Buenos Aires Province | |
| Draw | 15–3–4 | (Argentina) Antonio Diaz | PTS | 10 | 1961–08–04 | (Argentina) Azul, Buenos Aires Province | |
| Win | 15–3–3 | (Argentina) Pablo Sagrispanti | PTS | 10 | 1961–06–09 | (Argentina) Azul, Buenos Aires Province | |
| Win | 14–3–3 | (Argentina) Ricardo Gonzalez | TKO | 6 (10) | 1961–05–05 | (Argentina) Azul, Buenos Aires Province | |
| Win | 13–3–3 | (Argentina) Carloz Vazquez | PTS | 10 | 1961–04–14 | (Argentina) Azul, Buenos Aires Province | |
| Win | 12–3–3 | Hector Wilson | TKO | 4 (10) | 1960–08–16 | (Argentina) Azul, Buenos Aires Province | |
| Loss | 11–3–3 | (Peru) Mauro Mina | KO | 8 (10) | 1960–06–19 | (Peru) Tribuna Norte, Lima | |
| Win | 11–2–3 | (Uruguay) Juan Carlos Comini | KO | 7 (10) | 1959–12–09 | (Uruguay) Palacio Peñarol, Montevideo | |
| Win | 10–2–3 | (Argentina) Jovito Arregui | PTS | 10 | 1959–10–31 | (Uruguay) Montevideo | |
| Win | 9–2–3 | (Argentina) Andrés Villalba | KO | 2 (10) | 1959–10–03 | (Uruguay) Montevideo | |
| Win | 8–2–3 | (Argentina) Aurelio Diaz | TKO | 2 (10); 3:00 | 1959–09–12 | (Uruguay) Palacio Peñarol, Montevideo | |
| Win | 7–2–3 | (Brazil) Luis Ignacio | KO | 3 (10) | 1959–08–23 | (Brazil) Rio de Janeiro | |
| Draw | 6–2–3 | (Argentina) Aurelio Diaz | PTS | 10 | 1959–07–24 | (Brazil) Estádio do Ibirapuera, Rio de Janeiro | |
| Loss | 6–2–2 | (Argentina) Justo Benitez | PTS | 10 | 1959–06–03 | (Uruguay) Montevideo | |
| Draw | 6–1–2 | (Argentina) Aurelio Diaz | PTS | 4 | 1959–05–03 | (Uruguay) Montevideo | |
| Loss | 6–1–1 | (Brazil) Luis Ignacio | PTS | 10 | 1959–03–31 | (Brazil) São Paulo | |
| Draw | 6–0–1 | (Argentina) José Angel Mazur | PTS | 10 | 1958–10–22 | (Uruguay) Montevideo | |
| Win | 6–0 | (Argentina) José Angel Mazur | PTS | 10 | 1958–09–06 | (Uruguay) Palacio Peñarol, Montevideo | |
| Win | 5–0 | (Argentina) Justo Benitez | TKO | 5 (6) | 1958–08–09 | (Uruguay) Montevideo | |
| Win | 4–0 | (Uruguay) Marcelo Farias | TKO | 2 (6) | 1958–08–02 | (Uruguay) Palacio Peñarol, Montevideo | |
| Win | 3–0 | Julio Buffi | KO | 2 (6) | 1958–05–09 | (Argentina) Quilmes, Buenos Aires | |
| Win | 2–0 | Tomas Lenning | TKO | 3 (6) | 1958–04–19 | (Argentina) Luna Park, Buenos Aires | |
| Win | 1–0 | (Argentina) Rene Pereyra | TKO | 4 (6) | 1958–04–05 | (Argentina) Luna Park, Buenos Aires | |

== Exhibition boxing record ==
| 1 fight | 0 wins | 0 losses |
|---|---|---|
| Non-scored | 1 | |

| No. | Result | Record | Opponent | Type | Round, time | Date | Location | Notes |
|---|---|---|---|---|---|---|---|---|
| 1 | —N/a | 0–0 (1) | (United States) Muhammad Ali | —N/a | 8 | Aug 1, 1972 | La Monumental, Barcelona, Spain | Non-scored bout |

== See also ==
- List of Argentines
