= Keena =

Keena is both a given name and surname. Notable people with the name include:

== Given name ==
- Keena Rothhammer (born 1957), American Olympic swimmer
- Keena Turner (born 1958), American football player
- Keena Young (born 1985), American basketball player

== Surname ==
- Aidan Keena (born 1999), Irish football player
- Leo J. Keena (1878–1967), American football player and diplomat
- Monica Keena (born 1979), American actress and model
- Mateo Banks y Keena (1872–1949), Argentine spree killer

== Stage name ==
- Keena, birth name Song Ja-kyung, South Korean singer and member of Fifty Fifty
