= Bancks =

Bancks is a surname. Notable people with the name include:

- Carter Bancks (born 1989), Canadian professional ice hockey player
- Jacob Bancks (1662–1724), Swedish naval officer in the British service
- Jimmy Bancks (1889–1952), Australian cartoonist
- John Bancks (1709–1751), English writer
- Tristan Bancks (born 1974), Australian children's and teen author

== See also ==
- Banks (surname)
