= Mauro Mina =

Peruvian boxer

Personal information
- Nickname: El Expreso de Chincha/ Bombardero de Chincha
- Born: Mauro Mina Baylon; November 12, 1933 Chincha, Peru
- Died: June 1, 1993 aged 59
- Height: 5 ft 11.5 in (1.82 m)
- Weight: Light Heavyweight

Boxing career
- Stance: Orthodox

Boxing record
- Total fights: 58
- Wins: 52
- Win by KO: 25
- Losses: 3
- Draws: 3

Mauro Mina Baylón (November 22, 1933 – June 1, 1993) was a Peruvian Light Heavyweight boxer known as the "Bombardero de Chincha". El Comercio Perú has posthumously named him one of Peru's best boxers.

He was born in Chincha on November 22, 1933. It had been a long road for Mina. He began life in a rural African-Peruvian community, was a child worker in Chincha, Peru and struggled as a young man in Lima before becoming a professional boxer. As his career and fame progressed, he became the toast of the city, the hope of Peru and a national symbol in a fragmented society.

== Boxing career ==
As an amateur he obtained the Latin American championship in the middleweight division in February 1952 in Lima, Peru. He started boxing professionally at the age of 22 defeating Chilean Manuel Vargas in 10 rounds on October 22, 1955. After a few fights in Lima, he had his first loss against Luiz Ignacio, in São Paulo.

After the loss to the Brazilian Mina won five straight fights before challenging Uruguayan Dogomar Martinez for the South American Light Heavyweight Title in October 1958. The fight was held in Montevideo, Uruguay and Martinez came out a victorious on a close decision to retain his title.

After that fight, Mina would not lose again for the next eight years of his career. In 1960 he was proclaimed South American Light Heavyweight Champion, a title he held until he vacated it in 1966. He was a new talent that arrived on the U.S. boxing scene in the 60s. Mauro Mina had become one of the best light heavyweights in the world by fighting exclusively in South America. Just one more obstacle stood between him and international stardom. He continued boxing and winning during the 60s in fights against Gregorio "Goyo" Peralta, Freddie Mack, Sugar Boy Nando, Guillermo Dutschmann, Henry Hank, Eddie Cotton all of which he won. He also won a fight against future champion Bob Foster, in 1963.

In 1962, after defeating Eddie Cotton by decision in 10 rounds in Lima, he had been ranked the number one contender by the prestigious Ring Magazine. He was ready for a shot at the Light Heavyweight title held by Harold Johnson but the discovery of a retinal injury acquired in one of his previous fights (allegedly against Cuban Lino Rendon) prevented such challenge from ever taking place.

== After boxing ==
After his retirement in 1965, he became a boxing professor in his own gym, and is remembered as a former glory in Peru. He had even a song composed to him by Peruvian singer Chabuca Granda, called "Puños de Oro".

He died in 1993 from a heart attack with a professional record of 58 fights, of which he won 52 (25 by KO), Lost 3, and Drew 3.
