= Edward Banks =

Edward Banks may refer to:

- Edward Banks (architect) (1817–1866), English architect
- Edward Banks (builder) (1769–1835), British civil engineer who built several of London's bridges
- Edward Banks (cricketer) (1820–1910), Welsh-born English cricketer
- Edward Banks (naturalist) (1903–1988), British administrator, amateur naturalist and museum curator
- Edward Banks (politician) (1836–1883), Hamburg lawyer and politician
- Edward Banks (Syndicus) (1796–1851), Syndicus of the Free City of Hamburg
- Eddie Banks, fictional character in defunct British soap opera, Brookside
- Ned Banks, fictional character in television drama, Ghost Whisperer
