= David Banks =

David Banks may refer to:

== Sports ==
- David Banks (cricketer, born 1961), English cricketer
- David Banks (cricketer, born 1975), English cricketer
- David Banks (rower) (born 1983), American Olympian
- David Banks (soccer) (born 1967), English-American soccer player

== Others ==
- David Banks (actor) (born 1951), British actor
- David Banks (climate adviser), American political advisor
- David Banks (journalist) (1948–2022), British newspaper editor and broadcaster
- David C. Banks (born 1962), American educator, chancellor of the New York City Dept. of Education
- David L. Banks (born 1956), American statistician
