= Floyd Bank =

Floyd Bank is an American former basketball coach at the high school, college, and professional level.

== Early life ==
Bank played basketball at Dewitt Clinton High School in the Bronx. He later went on to attend school at New York University.

== High school coaching ==
Floyd Bank spent 20 years at Long Island City High School coaching basketball. Bank moved on to Thomas Edison after this. Bank spent an additional 15 years coaching basketball at Thomas Edison High school (New York City). During that period he compiled a 550-241 record. He described his time as being tough, sometimes having to put 4-5 students into his car. Bank would go on to join the New York State Basketball Hall of Fame. After leaving Edison in 2001, he went on to take a position at Long Island University at CW Post. He retired as the coach with the most wins in the PSAL.

== College coaching ==
Bank was an assistant coach at New York University. Bank served as the head coach at Queens College basketball team where he led them to a 12-14 record. At CW Post he was an assistant coach as well. He additionally served as the New York Knicks Head Coach for their Summer Basketball League.

== Personal ==
Bank has been married to his wife Barbera for more than 60 years. He nominated Jeff Bieder for the New York State Basketball Hall of Fame.
