= Lawrence C. Bank =

Lawrence C. Bank was the associate provost for research at The City College of New York and a professor in the Department of Civil Engineering at the Grove School of Engineering. He is a registered Professional Engineer in the State of Wisconsin and the District of Columbia. He is a Fellow of the American Society of Civil Engineers, as well as a Fellow and currently President of the International Institute for FRP Composites in Construction. Prior to joining CCNY, Bank was on the faculty of the University of Wisconsin–Madison, the Catholic University of America and Rensselaer Polytechnic Institute. He has worked as a structural engineer for Leslie E. Robertson and Associates in New York City and as a consultant for the composite materials industry.

== Education ==
Bank completed his undergraduate degree in civil engineering at the Israel Institute of Technology in 1980. He received a master's degree in civil engineering from Columbia University in 1982 and a Master of Philosophy degree in the field of engineering mechanics from Columbia in 1984. In 1985 Bank completed his Ph.D. in civil engineering and engineering mechanics from Columbia University. Bank is registered as a Professional Engineer (P.E.) in both the state of Wisconsin and the District of Columbia.

== Research areas ==
Bank's primary research is in the area of the mechanics and design of composite material structures with an emphasis on applications to civil engineering. He has authored numerous technical publications on composite materials and structures. He is the author of the textbook "Composites for Construction: Structural Design with FRP Materials" (Wiley, 2006). Bank holds three patents.

== Awards ==
In 1999, Bank was awarded the ASCE's Walter L. Huber Civil Engineering Research Prize for his research and contributions to the field of fiber reinforced plastic/advanced composite materials and their application in civil engineering construction. In 2001, Bank was awarded the Richard R. Torrens Award from ASCE for exemplary work as the founding editor of the ASCE Journal of Composites for Construction, and in 2002 he was awarded the Thomas Fitch Rowland Prize by ASCE. In 2005, his work on FRP grid reinforcements for concrete bridge decks was recognized by Popular Science as one of "Best of What's New 2005."
