= Joshua Bank =

Ukrainian Hebrew writer and rabbi

Joshua ben Isaac Bank (Yiddish: יהושע בן יצחק בּאַנק) was a Hebrew writer and rabbi at Tulchin, Polodia, born in Satanov in the first half of the nineteenth century.

== Bibliography ==
Bank was the author of the following works:

- Avshalom ('The Downfall of Absalom'; Odessa, 1868), a tragedy in verse, with a supplement containing a selection of tales, legends, and epigrams;
- Sipurim nifla'im ('Wonderful Tales'; Odessa, 1870), translations from other languages into Hebrew verse; and
- Rosh millin ('Beginning of Words'; Zhitomir, 1872), a concise Hebrew-Yiddish dictionary.
