= Heide Banks =

American psychotherapist

- Born: Heide Mintzer
- Education: M.A. in Spiritual Psychology
- Alma mater: University of Santa Monica
- Occupations: Psychologist, author, media personality & relationship expert
- Website: heidebanks.com

Heide Banks is a psychotherapist, author, TV personality and relationship expert. She is the author of It Works for Me and has appeared on various television programs including 20/20, The Early Show, Good Morning America and The Oprah Winfrey Show.

== Career ==
Banks began her career as a theatre and television producer who produced projects including the Broadway theatre production of I Got a Girl for You! (The Frankenstein Musical) and American Playhouse specials True West and The Dining Room. She is an executive producer of the Cannes Film Festival winning documentary Freedom to Choose. She received her Masters of Arts in Spiritual Psychology from the University of Santa Monica.

In 1996, she authored It Works For Me. She was also a contributing editor for several books including Chicken Soup for the Soul. As a relationship expert, Banks makes regular television appearances on networks including ABC and CBS and CNN. She is also a contributor to The Huffington Post and is referenced in multiple bestsellers including Arianna Huffington's On Becoming Fearless...In Love, Work, and Life.

In 2004, Banks organized the New York Break Up Club, a social club for people who have recently left romantic relationships. She was a relationship therapist for contestants on The Bachelor and appeared on the 20/20 special Inside the Bachelor: The Stories Behind the Rose. In 2010 she appeared on the ABC TV special 25 Years Of Sexy: People Magazine's Sexiest Man Alive. The same year she was a featured panelist on TV Guide Channel's Curb: The Discussion.

Banks is the Chairman of the Board for A Factor Consulting Inc. in New York. She is the senior advisor to the Ignite-Good Movement and is the official representative to the United Nations for Center for Partnership Studies. She is also involved with The Flawless Foundation, an advocacy group for children with brain based behavioral challenges, as well as the non-profit arts association Performa and Phoenix House Drug Treatment Centers.
