= Timothy Banks =

American illustrator and author

Timothy Banks MFA
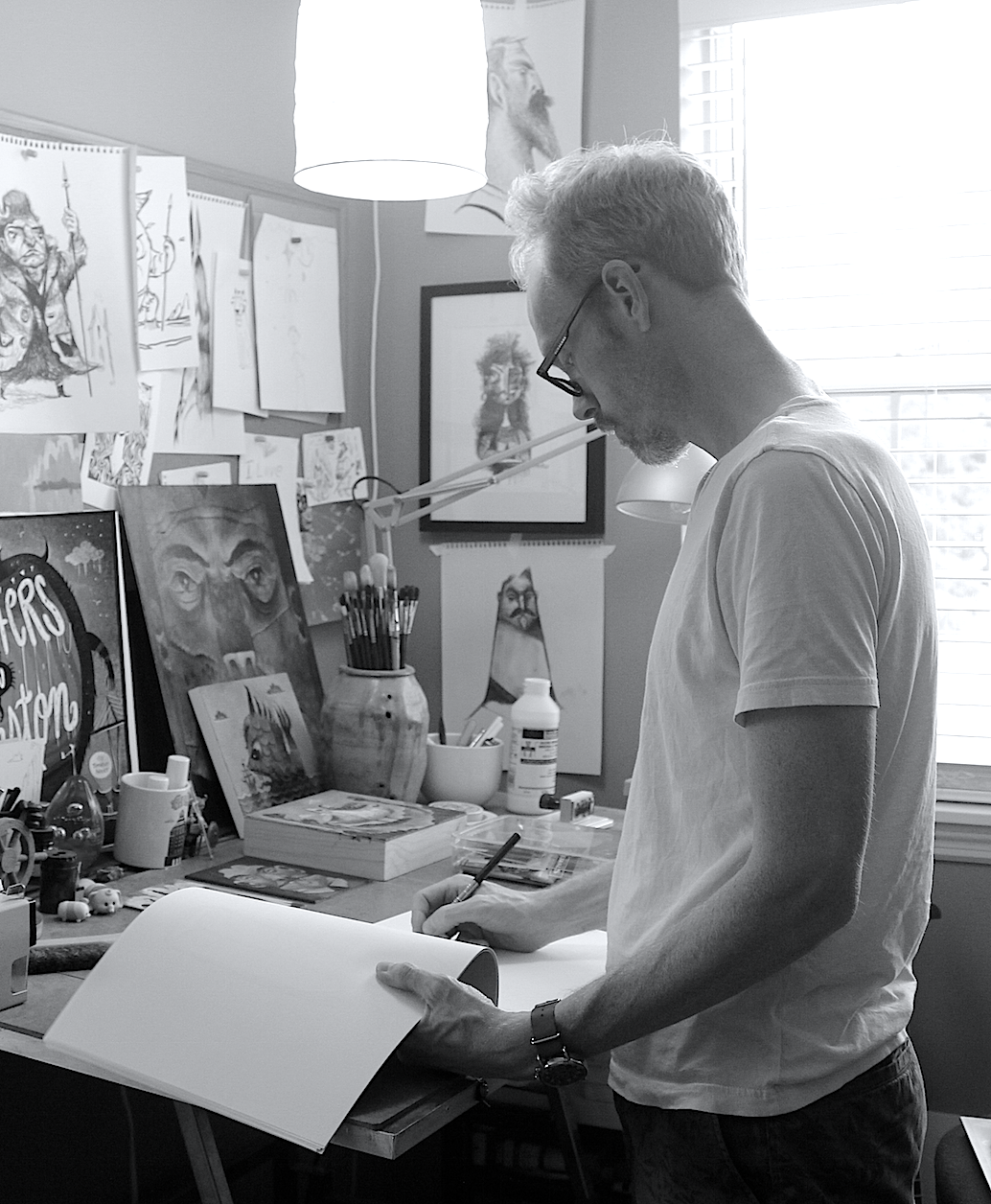
- At work in his studio
- Born: Asheville, NC
- Education: Savannah College of Art & Design
- Known for: Illustration, Painting
- Notable work: Monsters In Charleston, Nian, The Chinese New Year Dragon
- Website: http://timothybanks.com

Timothy Banks is an American illustrator and author recognized by Society of Illustrators Los Angeles, Spectrum, 3×3 Magazine, Creative Quarterly, PLAY! Illustration and Showcase 100. His clients include Nike, Paste Magazine, Egmont, Faber & Faber, and Nickelodeon. He has illustrated dozens of children's books, including a reimagining of the Wizard of Oz for young readers, There's A Norseman in the Classroom and the classic Enid Blyton series, The Five Finder Outer, for Egmont UK. His illustrations for Nian, The Chinese New Year Dragon, released in 2020, help garner a "Reviewer's Choice" Award from Feathered Quill. He has done extensive work for TOWN and Paste Magazine, including Paste's "The Failure Issue" named one of 2015's best covers by min. Also, Banks's work was selected to be the official image for Piccolo Spoleto 2014. In 2017, Banks wrote and published the illustrated anthology, Monsters In Charleston, depicting whimsical monsters taking over his hometown of Charleston, SC.

== Honors and awards ==
Banks is the recipient of numerous honors and awards:

- 2020, Gold Medal for Editorial Illustration, Society of Illustrators Los Angeles
- 2020, Feathered Quill Reviewer's Choice Award, Nian, The Chinese New Year Dragon
- 2018, 3x3 Picture Books Show Winner
- 2018, American Marketing Award for Illustration
- 2014, 2018 200 Best Illustrators Worldwide
- Creative Quarterly 36 Winner
