= Lesley Banks =

Visual artist in Glasgow

Lesley Banks (born 1962) is a British artist based in Glasgow.

== Biography ==
Banks was born in Oxford and studied at the Glasgow School of Art from 1980 to 1984 and then spent two years, on a travelling scholarship, studying in Europe including several months based in Amsterdam. On returning to Britain, Banks worked at a gallery in Glasgow until 1989 when she left to concentrate full-time on her art. Her paintings combine both realistic and surrealist elements. During 1999 Banks was the artist-in-residence at Edinburgh Zoo and has exhibited in numerous solo and group shows in Scotland, winning prizes in several of the latter. Both Aberdeen Art Gallery and the Lillie Art Gallery in Milngavie hold examples of her paintings. Beginning in 2016, Banks spent 15 months as Scotland's first ever artist-in-residence of the nation's canals. The project resulted in an exhibition titled "Gongoozler" with over 40 paintings celebrating Scotland's waterways.
