= Azul, Buenos Aires =

Azul
- Town
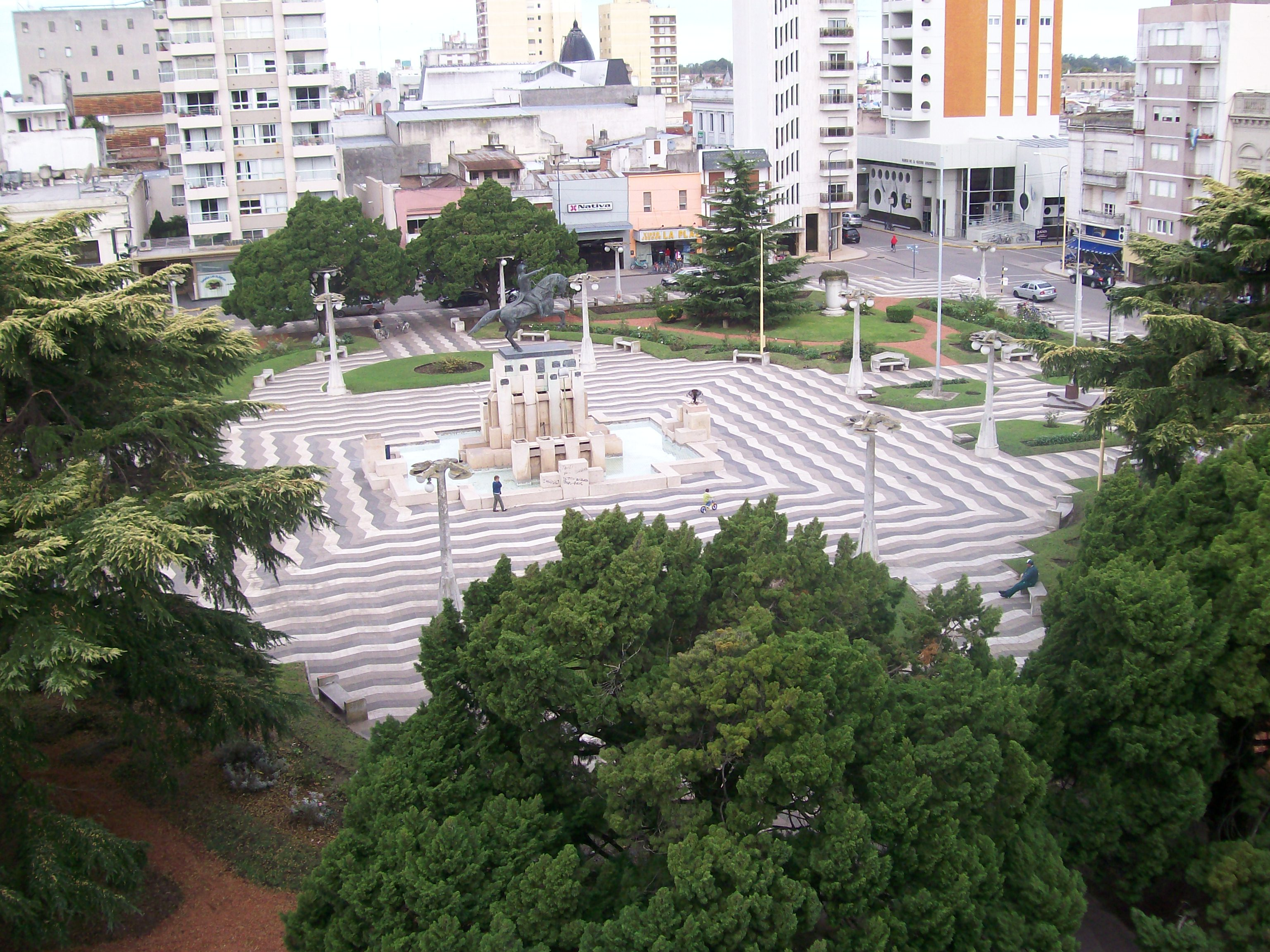
- Plaza San Martín

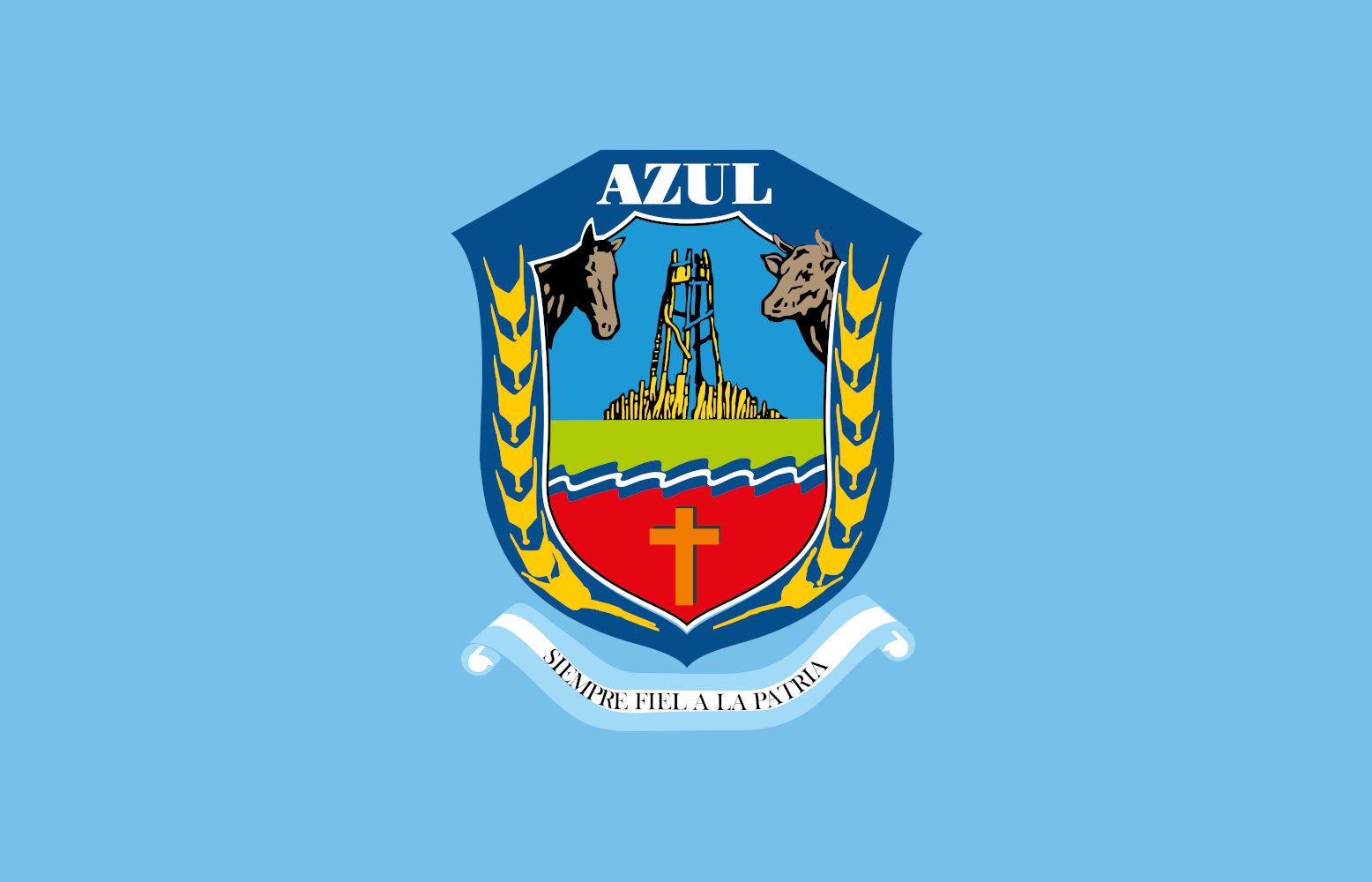
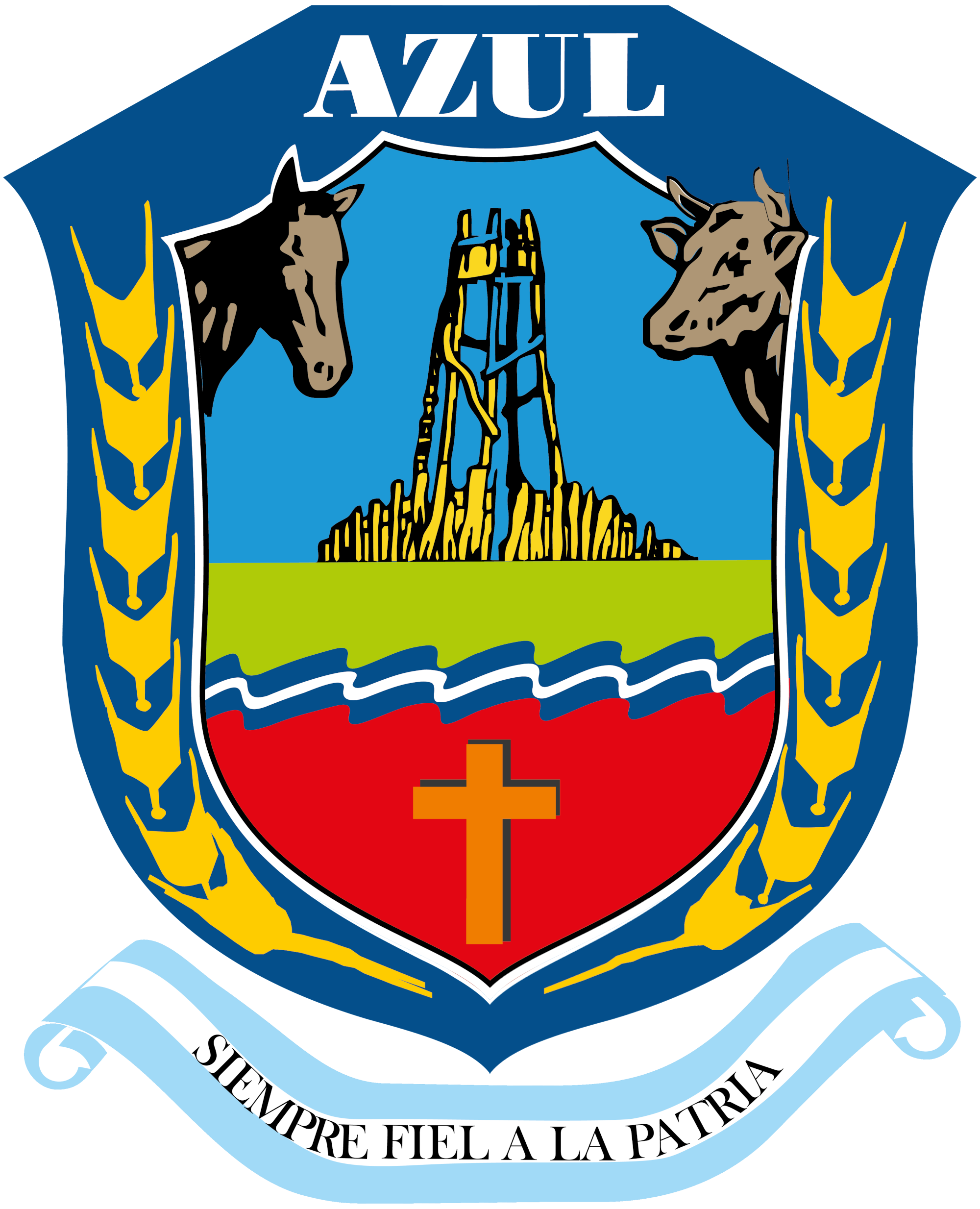
- Flag Coat of arms
- Interactive map of Azul
- Coordinates: 36°47′S 59°51′W
- Country: Argentina
- Province: Buenos Aires
- Partido: Azul
- Founded: December 16, 1832
- Elevation: 137 m (449 ft)

Population (2010 census)
  - Total: 55,728
- CPA Base: B 7330
- Area code: +54 2281
- Climate: Cfb
- Website: www.azul.gov.ar

Azul (Spanish pronunciation: [aˈsul], English: "blue", for the stream Azul, which flows through the area) is the head city of the Azul Partido, located at the center of the Buenos Aires Province in Argentina, 300 km south of Buenos Aires. It has 63,000 inhabitants as per the 2001 census [INDEC] .

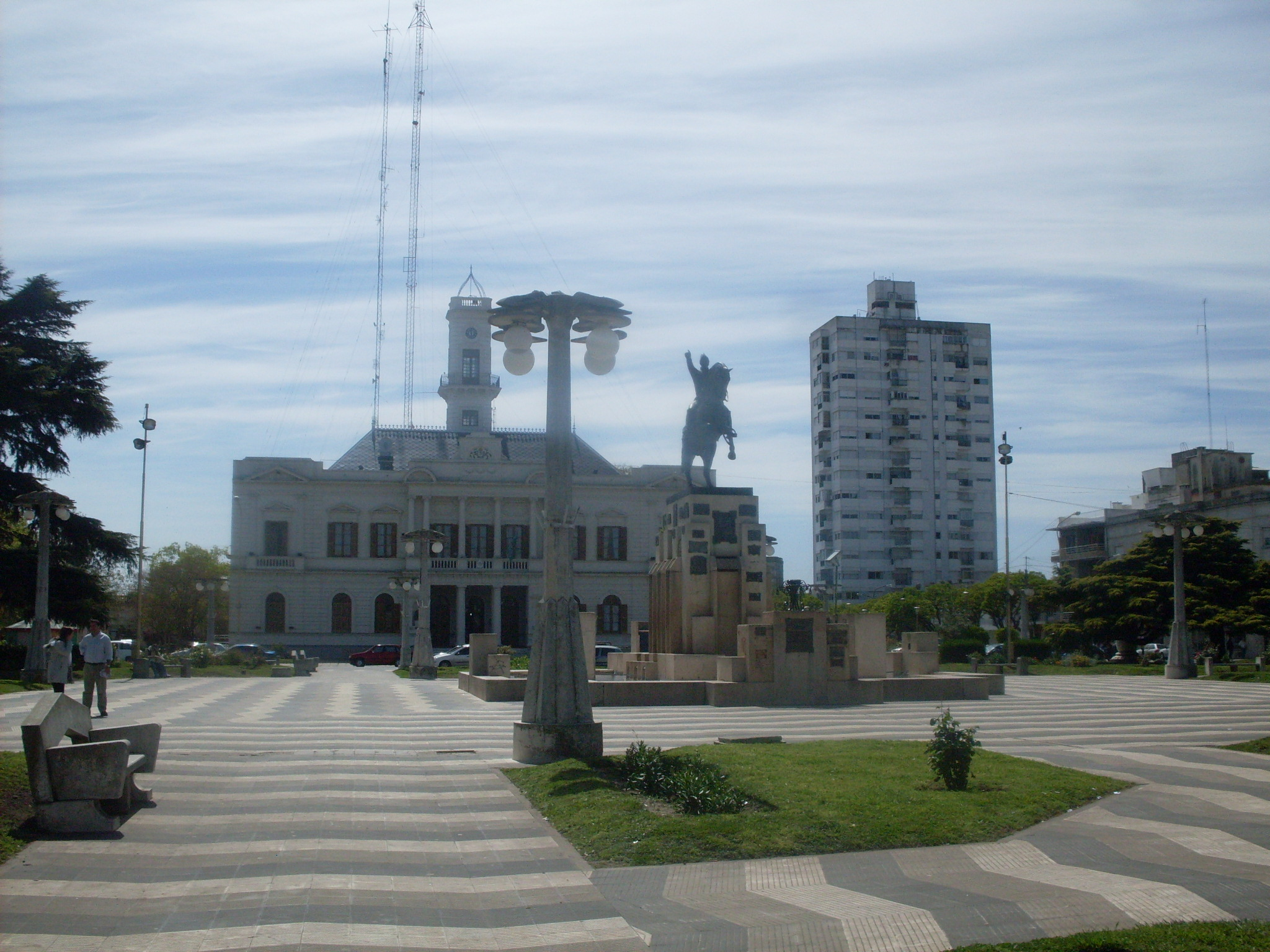
City Hall

Its principal, goods-producing economic activities are agriculture and the raising of cattle for meat and leather exports. Home to a dynamic services sector, over 2,000 commercial businesses are registered in the city.It is the birthplace of Franco Mastantuono.

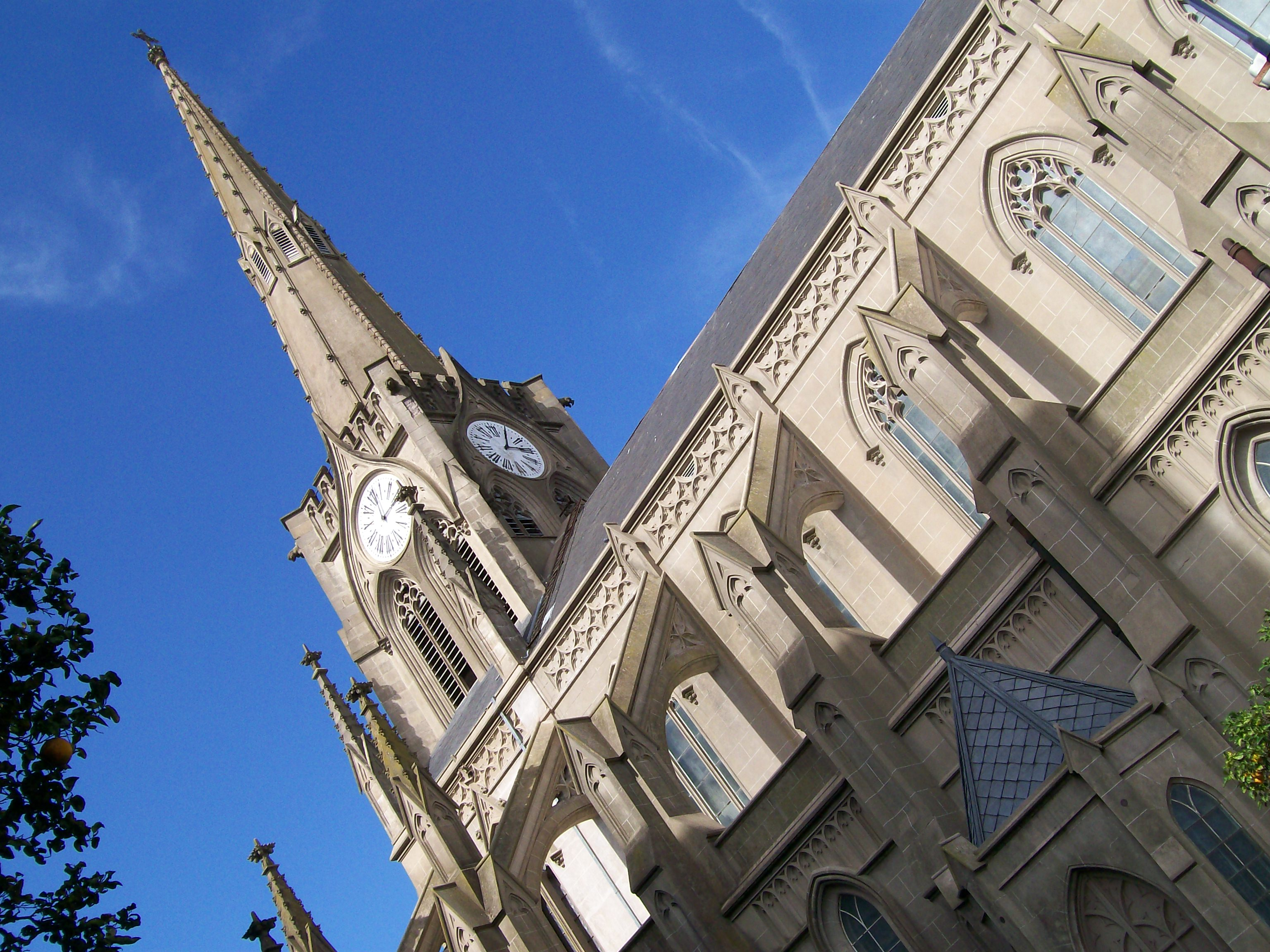
Cathedral of Our Lady of the Rosary

The town was founded on December 16, 1832, following Governor Juan Manuel de Rosas' orders for the construction of a fort, San Serapio Mártir del Arroyo Azul, to guard against indigenous raids. Subsequent land grants led to the development of a stable community, and in 1895, Azul was formally declared a town by provincial authorities. The local cathedral, Nuestra Señora del Rosario, was consecrated in 1906.

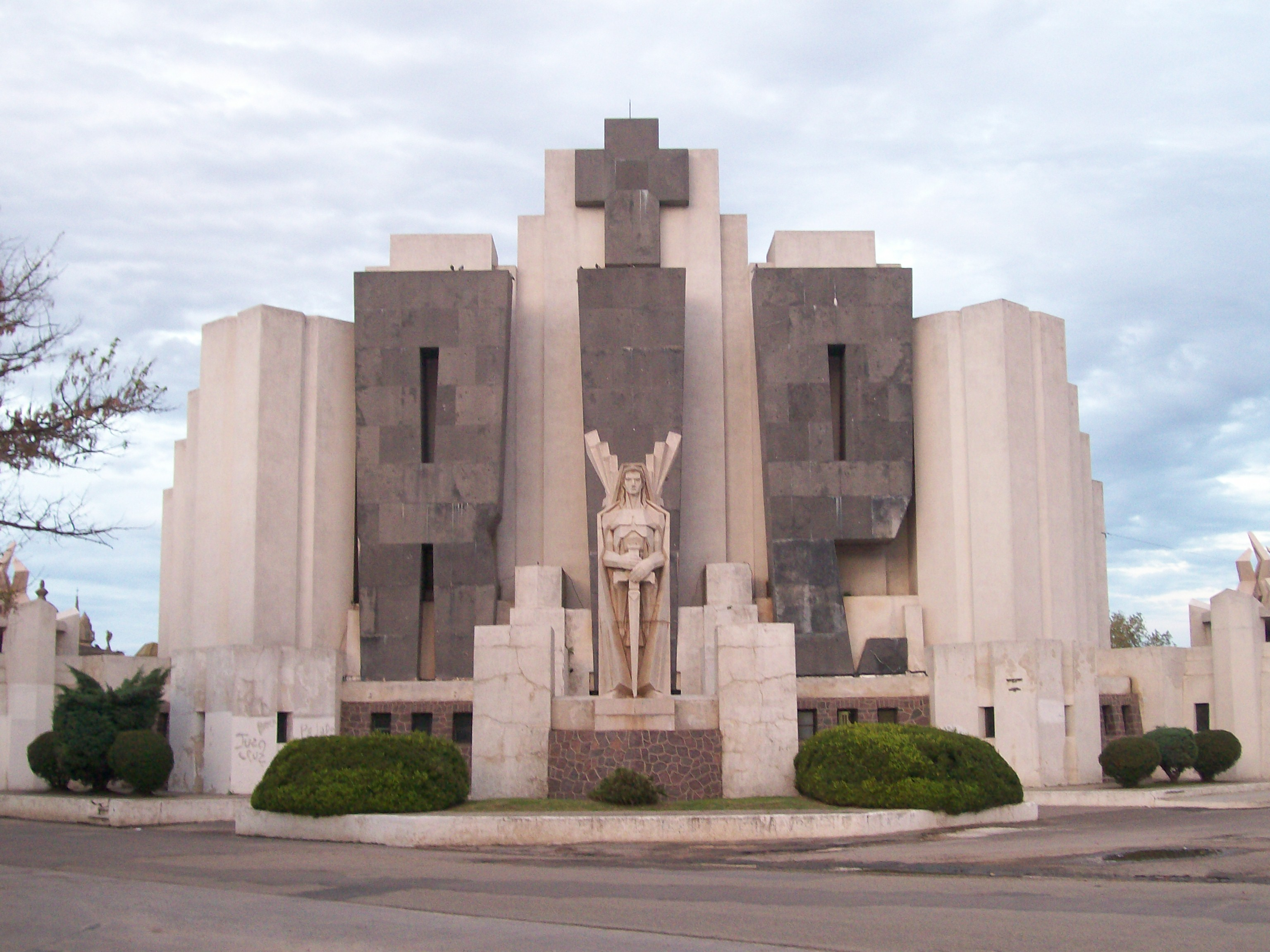
Monument in the Azul Cemetery, by Francisco Salamone

The town's cemetery portal and main slaughterhouse were both designed by architect Francisco Salamone, and contain elements of Art Deco style. Built in the late 1930s, these buildings were some of the first examples of modern architecture in rural Argentina. The town was the scene of an attack on outlying Army barracks by far-left ERP militants on January 19, 1974, the most violent assault of its kind in the country up to that point.

Azul is home to the schools of Agronomy and Law of the National University of Central Buenos Aires. The Teatro Español, founded in the city in 1897, is among the most important of the central pampas area, and in 1992, hosted the Bolshoi Ballet.

The Miguel de Cervantes Festival is held there every spring since 2007, and Casa Ronco, an antiquarian library and museum, maintains the country's best collections relating to the noted Spanish writer. Casa Ronco is named after the collector Bartolomé Ronco. Azul was declared Argentina's "City of Cervantes" by UNESCO in 2007.

== Notable people ==
- Matías Almeyda (1974) - former football player and manager.
- Federico Delbonis (1990) - professional tennis player.
- Mateo Banks (1872–1949) - first Argentine mass murderer, he killed six relatives and two family's employees in 1922.
- Franco Mastantuono (2007) - football player for Real Madrid.

== Climate ==
Climate data for Azul, Buenos Aires Province (1991–2020, extremes 1961–present)
Month	Jan	Feb	Mar	Apr	May	Jun	Jul	Aug	Sep	Oct	Nov	Dec	Year
Record high °C (°F)	40.6 (105.1)	37.8 (100.0)	36.7 (98.1)	33.9 (93.0)	29.5 (85.1)	24.3 (75.7)	26.2 (79.2)	33.0 (91.4)	30.9 (87.6)	33.3 (91.9)	35.5 (95.9)	40.6 (105.1)	40.6 (105.1)
Mean daily maximum °C (°F)	29.5 (85.1)	27.9 (82.2)	25.1 (77.2)	21.1 (70.0)	17.1 (62.8)	13.8 (56.8)	13.2 (55.8)	15.6 (60.1)	17.6 (63.7)	20.6 (69.1)	24.4 (75.9)	28.1 (82.6)	21.2 (70.2)
Daily mean °C (°F)	21.6 (70.9)	20.3 (68.5)	17.8 (64.0)	14.0 (57.2)	10.5 (50.9)	7.5 (45.5)	6.9 (44.4)	8.6 (47.5)	10.7 (51.3)	14.0 (57.2)	17.2 (63.0)	20.3 (68.5)	14.1 (57.4)
Mean daily minimum °C (°F)	14.0 (57.2)	13.3 (55.9)	11.3 (52.3)	7.9 (46.2)	5.2 (41.4)	2.4 (36.3)	1.8 (35.2)	3.0 (37.4)	4.4 (39.9)	7.6 (45.7)	10.1 (50.2)	12.5 (54.5)	7.8 (46.0)
Record low °C (°F)	2.1 (35.8)	2.0 (35.6)	−1.7 (28.9)	−4.0 (24.8)	−7.2 (19.0)	−10.1 (13.8)	−10.1 (13.8)	−8.8 (16.2)	−8.6 (16.5)	−5.0 (23.0)	−3.9 (25.0)	−1.6 (29.1)	−10.1 (13.8)
Average precipitation mm (inches)	103.8 (4.09)	101.6 (4.00)	113.9 (4.48)	90.6 (3.57)	55.7 (2.19)	37.1 (1.46)	40.8 (1.61)	59.2 (2.33)	67.5 (2.66)	92.0 (3.62)	97.9 (3.85)	75.4 (2.97)	935.5 (36.83)
Average precipitation days (≥ 0.1 mm)	8.0	7.3	8.3	8.1	6.3	5.2	6.3	5.9	6.6	9.4	9.0	7.8	88.1
Average snowy days	0.0	0.0	0.0	0.0	0.0	0.0	0.1	0.1	0.0	0.0	0.0	0.0	0.1
Average relative humidity (%)	65.5	72.1	76.6	77.9	81.4	80.5	79.7	75.3	73.1	74.1	69.5	63.5	74.1
Mean monthly sunshine hours	279.0	248.6	238.7	195.0	158.1	138.0	142.6	176.7	186.0	220.1	261.0	266.6	2,510.4
Mean daily sunshine hours	9.0	8.8	7.7	6.5	5.1	4.6	4.6	5.7	6.2	7.1	8.7	8.6	6.9
Percentage possible sunshine	53	60	52	55	50	38	39	47	50	47	52	51	50
Source 1: Servicio Meteorológico Nacional
Source 2: UNLP (percent sun only 1971–1980)
