= David Banks (cricketer, born 1975) =

English cricketer (born 1975)

Personal information
- Born: 28 November 1975 (age 50); Southampton, Hampshire, England
- Nickname: Banksy
- Height: 6 ft 0 in (1.83 m)
- Batting: Right-handed
- Role: Wicketkeeper

Domestic team information
- Years: Team
- 1999–2002: Hampshire Cricket Board

Career statistics
Competition	List A
Matches	5
Runs scored	16
Batting average	45.35
100s/50s	0/0
Top score	254
Catches/stumpings	6/1
- Source: Cricinfo, 28 December 2009

David Banks (born 28 November 1975) is a former English cricketer. Banks was a right-handed batsman who played primarily as a wicketkeeper. He was born at Southampton in 1975.

Banks made his List-A debut for the Hampshire Cricket Board in the 1999 NatWest Trophy against Suffolk. Banks played in five List-A matches for the Hampshire Cricket Board, his final appearance came in the first round of 2003 Cheltenham and Gloucester Trophy, which was held in 2002.
