= Enoch Marvin Banks =

American historian (1877–1911)

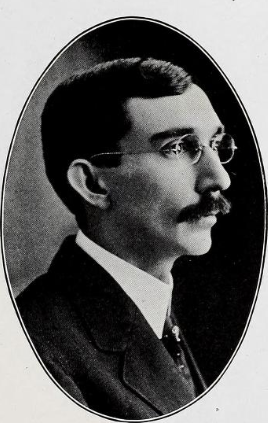
- Banks in 1911
- Born: November 28, 1877; Newnan, Georgia, U.S.
- Died: November 21, 1911 (aged 33); Newnan, Georgia, U.S.
- Occupation: Historian
- Known for: Refuting the Lost Cause of the Confederacy
- Title: Professor of History and Political Economy

Academic background
- Thesis: The economics of land tenure in Georgia (1905)

Enoch Marvin Banks (November 28, 1877 – November 21, 1911) was an American historian and professor at the University of Florida. In 1911, after the publication of an article attributing the cause of the American Civil War to slavery and criticizing the role of the Confederacy, he was forced to resign.

Enoch died shortly after his resignation.

== Early life and education ==
Banks was born on November 28, 1877. He completed his undergraduate studies at Emory College, graduating in 1897, and earned a master's degree from the same school in 1900. He received a Ph.D. from Columbia University in 1905. He wrote his dissertation on the economics of land tenure in Georgia.

== Career ==
Banks held various teaching positions after earning his Ph.D., teaching at Columbia University and the University of Pennsylvania, along with a short stint in Germany. In 1907 he became a professor of history and economics at the University of Florida.

On February 9, 1911, The Independent published an article by Banks titled "A Semi-Centennial View of the Civil War". In the article, he made the case that "the fundamental cause of secession and the Civil War" was the South's refusal to end the institution of slavery. This claim was in direct opposition to the Lost Cause of the Confederacy, a commonly held racist belief in the South, and quickly sparked outrage, both in Florida and across the region. After the article's publication, Banks was warned about potential ramifications by Andrew Sledd, the University of Florida's former president who had been forced out of a job at Emory University because of his protests against lynching.

A coalition of confederate organizations quickly joined together to call for Banks' resignation, including the United Daughters of the Confederacy, the Sons of Confederate Veterans, and the United Confederate Veterans. Powerful figures in state government such as the Florida Board of Control, Governor Albert W. Gilchrist, and former legislator John Beard viewed Banks' removal as the only way to resolve the conflict. Banks submitted his resignation on March 9, one month after the article's publication. Albert Murphree, the University's president, initially refused to accept it, fearing more outrage. In April, the state Board of Control directed Murphree to process the resignation and Banks stepped down from his professorship.

The editorial board of The Independent defended Banks after his resignation and sharply criticized his detractors, writing that "not yet is it allowed for a man to express opinions of his own" in the South. Other public defenders of Banks included prominent Southern economist James W. Garner and Andrew Sledd.

== Later life and legacy ==
After resigning, Banks moved to Newnan, Georgia. Only a few months later, on November 21, 1911, he died from an unknown illness. Some of his contemporaries suspected that the stress placed on him as a result of his article's controversy contributed to his death. Later analyses of Banks' article and the episode as a whole have noted that Banks was not a progressive on issues of race and that even within the article, he explicitly opposed granting Black citizens the right to vote. Banks' papers are held by Emory University.
