= Banksia (disambiguation) =

Banksia is a genus of iconic Australian wildflowers.

Banksia may also refer to:

- Banksia, the official name of WASP-19b, an exoplanet in the WASP-19 system
- Banksia, New South Wales, a suburb of Sydney, Australia
- Rosa banksiae, a species of rose

== See also ==
- Banksia Men, characters in the children's book Snugglepot and Cuddlepie
- Banksiadale, a locality and former town in the Peel region of Western Australia
