= Ramón Rocha =

Spanish politician (1939–2024)

Member of the Assembly of Extremadura for Badajoz
- In office 20 June 1995 – 17 June 2003

Personal details
- Born: Ramón Rocha Maqueda; 4 September 1939 Jerez de los Caballeros, Spain
- Died: 14 May 2024 (aged 84) Olivenza, Spain
- Party: PSP; PSOE

Ramón Rocha Maqueda (4 September 1939 – 14 May 2024) was a Spanish politician. A member of the Spanish Socialist Workers' Party, he served in the Assembly of Extremadura from 1995 to 2003.

Rocha died in Olivenza on 14 May 2024, at the age of 84.
