= Tom Banks =

Tom, Thomas, or Tommy Banks may refer to:

== Arts ==
- Thomas Banks (sculptor) (1735–1805), English sculptor
- Thomas Joseph Banks (1828–1896), also known as Thomas John Banks, British painter
- Thomas P. Banks (1848–1888), Australian church organist
- Tom Banks (EastEnders), a character in the British soap opera EastEnders
- Tommy Banks (musician) (1936–2018), Canadian pianist, composer, conductor, and politician

== Sports ==
- Tom Banks (American football) (born 1948), former NFL center
- Tom Banks (Australian rules footballer) (1867–1919), player and administrator with Fitzroy Football Club
- Tom Banks (rugby league), rugby league footballer of the 1930s and 1940s for England, Huddersfield and Castleford
- Tom Banks (rugby union, born 1858) (1858–1915), rugby union footballer of the 1880s for British Isles, and Swinton
- Tom Banks (rugby union, born 1994), Australian international rugby union footballer
- Tommy Banks (American football) (born c. 1979), former American football fullback
- Tommy Banks (footballer) (1929–2024), English footballer

== Other ==
- Thomas Banks (priest) (died 1634), dean of St Asaph
- Thomas Christopher Banks (1765–1854), British genealogist
- Tom Banks (physicist) (born 1949), American physicist
- Tommy Banks (chef) (born 1989), British chef

== See also ==
- Thomas Banks Cabaniss (1835–1915), American politician from Georgia
