= Aaron Banks =

Aaron Banks may refer to:

- Aaron Banks (American football) (born 1997), American football offensive lineman
- Aaron Banks (martial artist) (1928–2013), American martial artist

== See also ==
- Arron Banks (born 1966), British political donor
- Aaron Bank (1902–2004), US Army officer; founded the US Army Special Forces (the "Green Berets")
