= Edward Banks (naturalist) =

British colonial administrator

Edward (Bill) Banks (1903–1988) was a British administrator, amateur naturalist and museum curator.

== Life ==
Banks was born in Newport, Wales. He was the only son of Reginald Clare Banks, a colliery proprietor, but had three older sisters and went on to study zoology at Oxford University.

In 1925 Banks entered the Sarawak Service and served as a District Officer during the period of the White Rajahs. He was also Curator of the Sarawak Museum in Kuching from 1925 to 1945. During the Japanese occupation of Sarawak in the Second World War, Banks was interned at Batu Lintang camp near Kuching. Following the war, he surveyed the population of Sarawak together with John Coleraine Hanbury Barcroft to gauge their views on possible annexation by the United Kingdom. Banks retired in 1950.

A collection of Banks' papers are in the Papers of the Brooke Family of Sarawak (1941–1981), held in the Rhodes House Library in Oxford, England.

== Selected publications ==
=== Articles ===
- 1931 "A trip through the Murut country. Ulu Trusan and Bah Kelalan." Sarawak Gazette 61:144-146.
- 1936 "The Kelabit country. An account of a recent visit." Sarawak Gazette 66:158-159.
- 1937a "Some megalithic remains from the Kelabit country in Sarawak with some notes on the Kelabits themselves." Sarawak Museum Journal 4(5):411-437.
- 1937b "Native drinks in Sarawak." Sarawak Museum Journal 4(5):439-447.
- 1937c "Drink." Sarawak Gazette 67:3-6 (reprint of 1937b).
- 1939 "Murut morons." Sarawak Gazette 69(1030):107.
- 1940 "The natives of Sarawak." Journal of the Malaysian Branch of the Royal Asiatic Society 18:49-54.

=== Books ===
- 1949. A Naturalist in Sarawak. Kuching Press: Kuching, Sarawak.
- 1949. Bornean Mammals. Kuching Press: Kuching, Sarawak.
- c.1963. The Green Desert. Author.
