= Mateo Banks =

Argentine mass murderer (1872–1949)

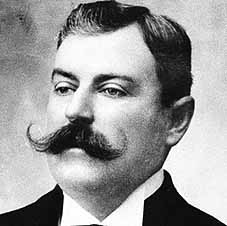
- Mateo Banks portrait
- Born: Mateo Banks y Keena; 18 November 1872; Chascomus, Buenos Aires Province, Argentina
- Died: 28 August 1949 (aged 76); Buenos Aires, Argentina
- Resting place: La Chacarita cemetery
- Other name: Eduardo Morgan
- Occupation: Farmer
- Spouse: Máxima Gainza de Banks
- Children: 4
- Convictions: 8 counts of premeditated murder
- Penalty: Life imprisonment

Details
- Date: 18 April 1922
- Targets: 6 members of his family • 3 siblings • 1 sister-in-law • 2 nieces 2 family employees
- Killed: 8
- Weapon: 16-gauge double-barrelled shotgun

Mateo Banks y Keena (18 November 1872 – 28 August 1949) was an Argentine spree killer who murdered six members of his family, in addition to two of the family's employees. The crimes occurred on two of the family's rural estates at Parish, near Azul, Buenos Aires Province, Argentina, on 18 April 1922.

== Background ==
Born in a family of Irish ancestry originally from Chascomús, by 1922 the Banks brothers owned two cattle ranches in Parish, a rural area several miles north of Azul, referred to as "El Trébol" ("The Shamrock") and "La Buena Suerte" ("The Good Luck"). "El Trébol" and "La Buena Suerte" were inherited from their father, the Irish immigrant Matthew Banks, who had died in 1909.

Matthew Banks was married to Mary Ann Keena & Gibson, who died in 1908. They left seven sons and daughters; María Ana, Dionisio, Miguel, Mateo, Pedro, Catalina and Brígida. Pedro and Brígida died in 1911, the latter in Ireland, just 18 days after getting married, while Catalina also got married in Ireland, settled there and after 1922 became the only heir of her siblings.

Mateo Banks lived away from the ranches in a luxurious house in the town, with his upper-class wife Máxima Gainza, three sons and a daughter. A fervent and charitable Catholic, he was a member of the local chapter of the Jockey Club Argentino, the vice honorary consul of the United Kingdom and the commercial representative of the Studebaker car company in the region. Mateo Banks was also a councillor in the local education authority. Many people in Azul, however, suspected that he was living a double life of arrogance, wastefulness and prodigality. By this reason, Mateo's brothers ousted him from the family's business. All which was left for him was "Los Pinos", a smaller 116 hectares (290 acres) ranch adjoining "El Trebol".

=== A hidden criminal past ===
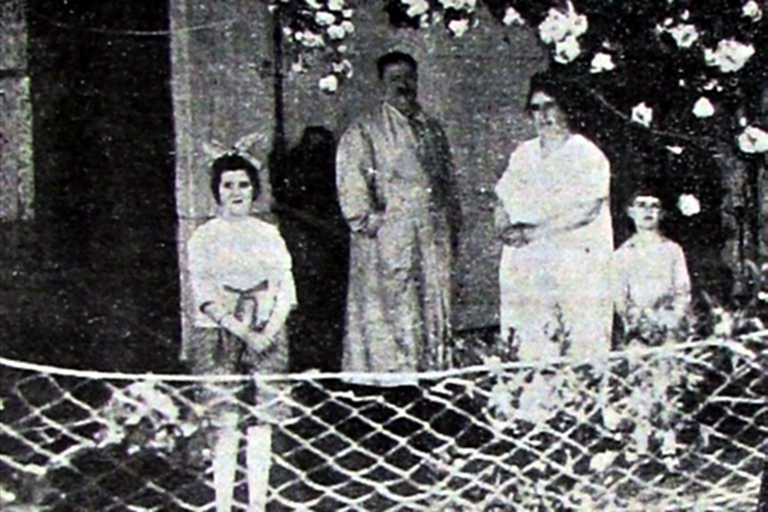
Mateo Banks at his house in Azul, surrounded by his wife Máxima Gainza, his daughter Pepa Ana Banks and his youngest son Pedro Banks, barely months before the murders. The children would change their surname to Gainza after their father's conviction.

Azul's historians Georgina Degano and Eduardo Aguero Mielhuerry carried out research on Mateo Banks' early life, and discovered some evidence of a criminal past.

When the Banks first arrived in Azul, in 1897, a young Mateo Banks was hired as a peon in "La Buena Suerte", then owned by Henry McCracken, a British subject. After improperly flirting with one of McCracken's daughters, Mateo Banks became involved in the theft of a sum of money from his employer (a couple also working in the ranch was accused and fired). When Banks claimed that he had found part of the stolen cash some days later, all suspicions fell on him. Sometime after this incident, McCracken's body was found hanging from a tree; it was never established whether this was suicide or murder, but once again all fingers pointed to Banks. After McCracken's demise, his family travelled back to Britain, leaving the ranch to be exploited by Matthew Banks as leaseholder.

He later bought "La Buena Suerte" and a nearby farm, "El Trébol". There were two more suspicious deaths by firearm at "La Buena Suerte"; the first, a visitor from Buenos Aires, shot dead in the course of a hunting trip in the ranch, and the second, one of Matthew's brothers. After the second shooting, Matthew advised his problematic son to move to San Luis Province, in western Argentina.

Once there, though the facts regarding locations and dates are scarce, it is known that Mateo got a job as manager of a ranch, and his financial situation improved dramatically. The historians claim that Mateo Banks returned to Azul in 1912, after the rural estate where he worked was robbed, and all its inhabitants killed, by unknown assailants, with the sole exception of Banks himself.

While living in San Luis, he married Máxima Gainza, the daughter of a rich Basque landowner from Olavarría, a town some miles away from Azul. Mateo's high-society environment detached him from the austere life of his brothers, who married women of Irish descent.

== Murders ==
On 18 April 1922 at dawn, Mateo Banks departed from Azul by train to the hamlet of Parish, accompanied by a young woman, María Josefa Gaitán, who had been hired as a maid by Banks unmarried sister, María Ana. María Josefa was the elder daughter of Juan Gaitán, one of his brother Dionisio's ranch hands. At 9:00 o'clock, Banks and the young woman arrived in El Trébol. Banks met a wirer and his brother who were working on a fence at Los Pinos, the Banks farm adjacent to El Trébol. They drank mate with Banks, who shortly after paid a visit to his brothers Miguel and Dionisio at El Trébol and La Buena Suerte, where they lived with their families. While staying with them he attempted to poison his relatives at lunchtime with strychnine in their puchero, but the bad smell and flavour resulted in the food being discarded.

In the afternoon, when Banks realized that his plans of poisoning his family had failed, he traveled by sulky from Los Pinos to La Buena Suerte, where his brother Dionisio was staying with his twelve-year-old daughter Sarita. After killing his brother with two shots from a double-barreled shotgun, he then beat Sarita with the weapon's barrels and threw her down a well. Banks then fired another two shots into the well, killing her. Juan Gaitán, who arrived shortly after, was also gunned down by Banks as soon as the worker dismounted from his horse.

Banks then traveled back five kilometers to El Trébol, where he met another rural worker named Claudio Loiza. After convincing Loiza that Dionisio was sick and needed aid, they went to La Buena Suerte. Partway between the two ranches, Banks shot Loiza to death and hid his body.

Once again at El Trébol, Banks spent the rest of the evening with those staying there; Bank's sister María Ana, his brother Miguel, who was terminally ill, Miguel's wife Julia Dillon, Gaitán's little daughter María Ercilia, and the other two Dionisio's daughters, Cecilia and Anita. At night he awoke his sister, convinced her to come to La Buena Suerte to check on Dionisio, and shot her in the back along the way, dropping her lifeless body from the sulky. He returned to El Trébol, woke up Miguel, his sister-in-law Julia, and fifteen-year-old Cecilia, and shot them each to death. He left five-year-old Anita and four-year-old María Ercilia alive and locked them in a room, not before providing the girls with water and hardtack.

In the first hours of 19 April, Banks sought the help of the family's doctor, Rafael Marquestán, who lived in the vicinity of El Trébol, claiming that all his family had been murdered in a robbery attempt by Loyza and Gaitán, whom he had shot in self-defense, and asked Marquestán for a ride to Azul. While on his way to town on the doctor's car, and still carrying the shotgun with him, Banks suspiciously suggested that no autopsies would be needed. Once at his house in Azul he ordered seven coffins by phone to the local mortuary. This because he knew that Loyza's body was still unaccounted for. Then Banks tried to contact his friend Agustín Carús, a renowned lawyer, who eventually refused to assist him.

== Banks' story ==
According to Banks, he came upon Gaitán and Loiza after they had attacked his family. Banks then shot Gaitán dead and wounded Loiza, who fled after shooting Banks in the foot. This "bullet hole" in his boot was later revealed to have been faked with an awl. He claimed he then spent time with his brother Miguel as he lay dying, though the autopsy showed that Miguel had died instantly. Eventually, the prosecution tied Banks to the purchase of the ammunition used in the murders and to the attempted poisoning of his family earlier on the day of the murders. He also confessed at one point, but later claimed it was under duress by the authorities and threats against his daughter.

== Motive ==
In the course of the investigation it was revealed that Banks had lost his fortune to gambling and was on the verge of destitution even after having sold part of his inheritance to his siblings. He had also sold large amounts of cattle that didn't belong to him after forging Dionisio's signature.

The prosecutor concluded that Banks wanted both to conceal his past misdeeds from the family and inherit the fortunes of both María Ana and Miguel. He couldn't attain Dionisio's fortune due to Dionisio's wife still being alive and away in a mental institution in La Plata. This (in addition to her youth making her an unreliable witness) explains why Anita was not killed. Since Dionisio would still have an heir (his wife), it was not profitable. Banks also spared María Ercilia's life because her death would have contradicted his story that her father, Juan Gaitán, was one of the perpetrators.

== Trial, conviction and later life ==
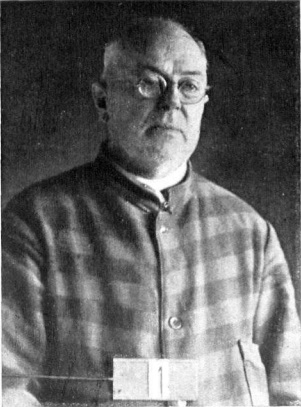
Mugshot of Mateo Banks in Ushuaia's Prison (1933)

After a first trial in Azul found him guilty, Banks had the benefit of a second trial in La Plata thanks to a legal technicality. Both proceedings ended with a sentence of life imprisonment. At the second trial famed lawyer Antonio Palacios Zinny tried to garner sympathy with the jury by having Banks poisoning himself in front of them with a (non-fatal) dose of cyanide. Banks wouldn't go through with it. The sensationalist press at the time nicknamed Banks "Mateocho", a pun in Spanish that means "I killed eight". Despite being eventually sentenced to life in prison and jailed in Ushuaia's penal colony in 1924, he was released for good behavior in 1942. Rejected by his wife and sons when he tried to settle in the city of Olavarria, where they were living by then, Banks moved to Buenos Aires under the assumed name of Eduardo Morgan, presumably with the financial help of his eldest son, Francisco. Mateo Banks died there in 1949 from a fall in the bathroom of his apartment at the neighbourhood of Flores, at the age of 76. His remains were buried in an unmarked grave at La Chacarita cemetery.

== See also ==
- Cayetano Santos Godino
- Robledo Puch
- List of mass murderers
- List of familicides
