= Zárate (surname) =

Origin
- Language: Basque
- Meaning: entrance to the grove coppice
- Region of origin: Spain

Other names
- Variant form: Zarate

Zárate is a surname of Spanish (Basque) origin.

== People with this name ==
- Agustín de Zárate (1514–1575), Spanish colonial civil servant, chronicler and historian
- Alexis Zárate (born 1994), Argentine football player
- Antonia Zárate (1775–1811), Spanish actress
- Ariel Zárate (born 1973), Argentine football player and manager, brother of Sergio, Rolando and Mauro Zárate
- Camila Zárate Mahecha (born 1987), Colombian actress
- Camila Zárate Zárate (born 1992), Chilean political activist
- Carlos Isagani Zarate (born 1967), Filipino politician
- Carlos Zárate Serna (born 1951), Mexican boxer
- Carlos Zárate Jr. (born 1988), Mexican boxer, son of Carlos Zárate Serna
- Carlos Zárate Fernández (born 1980), Spanish cyclist
- Darío Zárate (born 1977), Argentine football player
- Eladio Zárate (1942–2026), Paraguayan football player
- Fernando Zárate Salgado (born 1979), Mexican politician
- Francisco de Zárate y Terán (1610–1679), Spanish Roman Catholic prelate
- Gonzalo Zárate (born 1984), Argentine football player
- Jesús Zárate (born 1974), Mexican cyclist
- Jonathan Zárate (born 1999), Argentine football player
- Jorge Zárate (footballer) (born 1992), Mexican football player
- Jorge Zárate (actor), Mexican actor
- José Zárate (1949–2013), Colombian football player
- José Inez García Zárate (also known by Juan Francisco López-Sánchez and other names), carried out the shooting of Kathryn Steinle
- Juan Ortiz de Zárate (c. 1521 – 1575), Spanish Basque explorer and conquistador
- Juan Ortiz de Zárate (1581–1646), Roman Catholic Bishop of Salamanca
- Juan Zarate, American attorney and security advisor
- Juan Zárate, Argentine football player
- Julie Zarate (born 1970), American visual artist
- Junior Zarate (born 1978), Mexican football player
- Leandro Zárate (born 1984), Argentine football player
- León Zárate, Argentine actor
- Lucía Zárate (1864–1890), Mexican entertainer with dwarfism who performed in sideshows
- Luis Zárate (1940–2020), Mexican cyclist
- Manuel Alejandro Zárate (born 1988), Mexican football player
- Mauro Zárate (born 1987), Argentine football player, brother of Sergio, Ariel and Rolando Zárate
- Mauro Zárate (baseball) (born 1983), Venezuelan baseball player
- Maximiliano Zárate (born 1993), Argentine football player
- Nahuel Zárate (born 1993), Argentine football player
- Nirma Zárate (1936–1999), Colombian artist
- Oscar Zárate (born 1942), Argentine comic book artist and illustrator
- Pablo Zárate, known as Willka, Bolivian rebel leader
- Radamel Falcao, Colombian football player whose maternal surname is Zárate
- Rafael de Zárate y Sequera (ca. 1824–ca. 1904), mayor of Ponce, Puerto Rico, 1884–1886
- Robert Zarate (born 1987), Venezuelan baseball player
- Roberto Zárate (1932–2013), Argentine football player
- Rolando Zárate (born 1978), Argentine football player, brother of Sergio, Ariel and Mauro Zárate
- Rosa Zárate y Ontaneda (1763 -1813), Ecuadorian feminist activist
- Sergio Zárate (born 1969), Argentine football player, brother of Ariel, Rolando and Mauro Zárate
- Susan Zarate, American costume illustrator
- Tobías Zárate (born 2000), Argentine-born Chilean football player, son of Rolando Zárate
- Victoria Zárate Zurita (1893–1964), Spanish teacher and trade unionist
