= Carlos Zarate =

Carlos Zarate may refer to:

- Carlos Zárate Fernández (born 1980), Spanish cyclist
- Carlos Zárate Serna (born 1951), Mexican boxer
- Carlos Isagani Zarate (born 1967), Filipino lawyer, activist, and politician
- Carlos Serrano Zárate (born 1998), Paralympian swimmer from Colombia
- Carlos Zárate Jr. (born 1988), boxer from Mexico
