= Ossie Ocasio =

Puerto Rican boxer (born 1955)

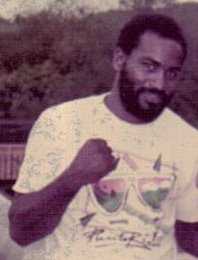

Personal information
- Nickname: Jaws
- Nationality: Puerto Rican
- Born: Osvaldo Ocasio; August 12, 1955 (age 71) Santurce, San Juan, Puerto Rico
- Height: 5 ft 11 1/2 in (182 cm)
- Weight: Cruiserweight; Heavyweight

Boxing career
- Reach: 74 in (188 cm)
- Stance: Orthodox

Boxing record
- Total fights: 37
- Wins: 23
- Win by KO: 12
- Losses: 13
- Draws: 1
- No contests: 0

Osvaldo "Ossie" Ocasio (born August 12, 1955) is a Puerto Rican former boxer who held the inaugural WBA cruiserweight title from 1982 to 1984. He was also a top heavyweight contender prior to his cruiserweight run. He scored notable wins against former cruiserweight champion Dwight Muhammad Qawi and top heavyweight contenders Jimmy Young (twice) and Pierre Coetzer, as well as drawing with future heavyweight champion Michael Dokes. Nicknamed "Jaws," his peculiar nickname was the result of him accidentally biting another boxer during a sparring session.

== Heavyweight contender ==
Ocasio originally campaigned in the heavyweight division, turning pro in 1976 and putting together ten wins before signing with Don King and making a name for himself outpointing King fighter Kevin Isaac.

In 1978, on the undercard of the Ken Norton vs. Larry Holmes title fight, Ocasio scored a major upset when he outpointed the highly regarded Jimmy Young, who had both outpointed George Foreman and fought Ken Norton to a split decision loss the year prior. In a rematch staged in Puerto Rico, Ocasio underlined his superiority by again outpointing a this time in-shape Young. It was Ocasio's career high in the heavyweight division.

This earned him his only world heavyweight title shot, against Larry Holmes in 1979. Attempting to become the first Hispanic world heavyweight champion, Ocasio was badly outclassed and knocked out in the seventh round.

In 1980, he fought red-hot undefeated prospect Michael Dokes to a draw. However, a rematch saw Ocasio surprisingly knocked out in one round. The following year, he traveled to the UK and made little effort against local prospect John L. Gardner, before collapsing without getting hit in the sixth round.

== Cruiserweight World Champion ==
External audio
- You may watch Ossie Ocasio vs Dwight Muhammad Qawi here

He later went down in weight to fight in the then-newly created cruiserweight division. In 1982, he was matched with Robbie Williams in South Africa for the inaugural WBA title. Ocasio became a world champion by beating Williams by a 15-round split decision. He shared honors as world champion of that division with countryman Carlos De León, the WBC world champion.

Ocasio made three successful defenses, winning 15-round decisions over Young Joe Louis and Randy Stephens, appearing on Jet Magazine the week before the Stephens bout, and knocking out John Odhiambo in the 15th round in Guaynabo, Puerto Rico. After the bout, Ocasio turned down a fight with British fighter David Pearce, after Morgans Palle had provided contracts to make the fight in the USA, due to the BBBoC not sanctioning the cruiserweight division in the UK. Ocasio eventually decided to return to South Africa, where he lost his title to Piet Crous by a 15-round decision. One month before losing the title, his brother had been murdered.

Ocasio, during his championship run, was able to buy a house in Trujillo Alto, where he maintained a large farm. He also participated in a Puerto Rican movie, playing a slave in the production.

He made a comeback in 1986 and won two fights, including a controversial ten-round majority decision over former world champion Dwight Muhammad Qawi in Atlantic City, New Jersey. Most observers had Qawi winning all ten rounds. He attempted to regain his world championship against Evander Holyfield in Marseille, France, but lost by a knockout in 11 rounds.

== Return to Heavyweight ==
He returned to the heavyweight division in 1988, defeating Pierre Coetzer in South Africa, but losing the decision in a rematch. After this fight, he was relegated to "trial horse" status.

In 1989, he gave Ray Mercer a tough fight, losing an eight-round split decision. In 1990, he dropped decisions to Tyrell Biggs and Bruce Seldon, then travelled to the UK for two fights, losing and being the first opponent to take Lennox Lewis to the distance and scoring an upset when stopping Jess Harding in eight rounds. Ocasio then traveled to Australia, where he was outpointed by the erratic Mike Hunter.

One last comeback in 1992 resulted in a dreary points loss to ex-contender Carl Williams, but it was hard-hitting Mexican–American prospect Alex García who convinced the usually durable Ocasio to retire—he decked Ocasio several times before knocking him out in the eighth.

He retired from boxing with a record of 23 wins, 13 losses, and one draw, with 12 knockout wins. He currently resides in Orlando, Florida.

== Professional boxing record ==
37 fights	23 wins	13 losses
By knockout	12	5
By decision	11	8
Draws	1	

No.	Result	Record	Opponent	Type	Round, time	Date	Location	Notes
37	Loss	23–13–1	Alex Garcia	TKO	8 (10), 1:59	Nov 23, 1992	Great Western Forum, Inglewood, California, US	
36	Loss	23–12–1	Carl Williams	UD	10	Aug 20, 1992	Trump Taj Mahal, Atlantic City, New Jersey, US	
35	Loss	23–11–1	Mike Hunter	UD	10	Dec 14, 1990	Hordern Pavilion, Sydney, New South Wales, Australia	
34	Win	23–10–1	Jess Harding	RTD	8 (10), 3:00	Oct 3, 1990	Festival Hall, Basildon, Essex, England, UK	
33	Loss	22–10–1	Lennox Lewis	PTS	8	Jun 27, 1990	Royal Albert Hall, Kensington, London, England, UK	
32	Loss	22–9–1	Bruce Seldon	UD	8	May 18, 1990	San Jose, California, US	
31	Loss	22–8–1	Tyrell Biggs	UD	10	Jan 11, 1990	Trump Plaza Hotel, Atlantic City, New Jersey, US	
30	Loss	22–7–1	Ray Mercer	SD	8	Dec 7, 1989	Mirage Hotel & Casino, Las Vegas, Nevada, US	
29	Loss	22–6–1	Pierre Coetzer	UD	10	Nov 26, 1988	Standard Bank Indoor Arena, Johannesburg, South Africa	
28	Win	22–5–1	Pierre Coetzer	UD	10	Mar 6, 1988	Good Hope Centre, Cape Town, South Africa	
27	Loss	21–5–1	Evander Holyfield	TKO	11 (15), 1:24	Aug 15, 1987	Saint-Tropez, Var, France	For WBA and IBF cruiserweight titles
26	Win	21–4–1	Dwight Muhammad Qawi	MD	10	May 15, 1987	Caesars Palace, Las Vegas, Nevada, US	
25	Win	20–4–1	Narcisco Maldonado	UD	10	Mar 23, 1986	Lawlor Events Center, Reno, Nevada, US	
24	Loss	19–4–1	Piet Crous	UD	15	Dec 1, 1984	Superbowl, Sun City, South Africa	Lost WBA cruiserweight title
23	Win	19–3–1	John Odhiambho	TKO	15 (15), 2:24	May 5, 1984	Mets Pavilion, Guaynabo, Puerto Rico	Retained WBA cruiserweight title
22	Win	18–3–1	Randy Stephens	UD	15	May 20, 1983	Dunes Outdoor Arena, Las Vegas, Nevada, US	Retained WBA cruiserweight title
21	Win	17–3–1	Eddie Taylor	UD	15	Dec 15, 1982	Aragon Ballroom, Chicago, Illinois, US	Retained WBA cruiserweight title
20	Win	16–3–1	Robbie Williams	SD	15	Feb 13, 1982	Rand Stadium, Johannesburg, South Africa	Won inaugural WBA cruiserweight title
19	Loss	15–3–1	John L. Gardner	KO	6 (10), 0:19	Mar 17, 1981	Wembley Arena, London, England, UK	
18	Win	15–2–1	Barry Funches	UD	10	Oct 23, 1980	Felt Forum, New York City, New York, US	
17	Loss	14–2–1	Michael Dokes	TKO	1 (10), 2:33	Jun 28, 1980	Coliseo Roberto Clemente, San Juan, Puerto Rico	
16	Draw	14–1–1	Michael Dokes	SD	10	Apr 19, 1980	Coliseo Pedrin Zorrilla, San Juan, Puerto Rico	
15	Win	14–1	Jack Sterling	TKO	1 (10), 1:10	Nov 20, 1979	Convention Hall, Miami Beach, Florida, US	
14	Loss	13–1	Larry Holmes	TKO	7 (15), 2:38	Mar 23, 1979	Las Vegas Hilton, Las Vegas, Nevada, US	For WBC heavyweight title
13	Win	13–0	Jimmy Young	UD	10	Jan 27, 1979	Coliseo Roberto Clemente, San Juan, Puerto Rico	
12	Win	12–0	Jimmy Young	SD	10	Jun 9, 1978	Caesars Palace, Las Vegas, Nevada, US	
11	Win	11–0	Kevin Isaac	UD	10	Apr 8, 1978	Estadio Juan Ramon Loubriel, Bayamón, Puerto Rico	
10	Win	10–0	Tom Nickson	KO	4 (6)	Jul 12, 1977	Orlando Sports Stadium, Orlando, Florida, US	
9	Win	9–0	Frank Schram	TKO	4 (?)	Jun 25, 1977	Estadio Juan Ramon Loubriel, Bayamón, Puerto Rico	
8	Win	8–0	Clarence Morris	KO	2 (6), 1:37	Jun 14, 1977	Orlando Sports Stadium, Orlando, Florida, US	
7	Win	7–0	Gene Idelette	KO	1 (?)	Mar 17, 1977	Coliseo Roberto Clemente, San Juan, Puerto Rico	
6	Win	6–0	Ed Turner	KO	2 (?)	Feb 12, 1977	Estadio Juan Ramon Loubriel, Bayamón, Puerto Rico	
5	Win	5–0	Aaron Solomon	KO	1 (?)	Aug 16, 1976	San Juan, Puerto Rico	
4	Win	4–0	Ed Turner	PTS	8	Jul 17, 1976	San Juan, Puerto Rico	
3	Win	3–0	Luis Reins	KO	1 (?)	Apr 27, 1976	Coliseo Roberto Clemente, San Juan, Puerto Rico	
2	Win	2–0	Rafael Guerrero	KO	2 (?)	Apr 5, 1976	Coliseo Roberto Clemente, San Juan, Puerto Rico	
1	Win	1–0	Lorenzo Simons	KO	3 (?)	Feb 20, 1976	Coliseo Roberto Clemente, San Juan, Puerto Rico	

== See also ==
- List of cruiserweight boxing champions
- List of Puerto Rican boxing world champions

Achievements
Inaugural Champion	WBA cruiserweight champion February 13, 1982 – December 1, 1984	Succeeded by Piet Crous
