= Wilfredo Gómez vs. Carlos Zárate =

1978 WBC Super bantamweight world championship boxing fight

- Date: October 28, 1978
- Venue: Roberto Clemente Coliseum, San Juan, Puerto Rico
- Title(s) on the line: WBC super bantamweight title

Tale of the tape
Boxer	(Puerto Rico) Wilfredo Gómez	(Mexico) Carlos Zárate
Nickname	Bazooka	Canas
Hometown	San Juan, Puerto Rico	Tepito, Mexico
Pre-fight record	21–0–1 (21 KO)	52–0–0 (51 KO)
Height	5 ft 5 1/2 in (166 cm)	5 ft 8 in (173 cm)
Weight	122 lb (55.3 kg)	122 lb (55.3 kg)
Style	Orthodox	Orthodox
Recognition	WBC super bantamweight champion	WBC bantamweight champion

Result
- Gómez defeated Zárate via TKO in the fifth round

Wilfredo Gómez vs. Carlos Zárate was a professional boxing match contested between WBC super bantamweight champion Wilfredo Gómez and WBC bantamweight champion Carlos Zárate, with Gómez' super bantamweight title on the line. The bout took place on October 28, 1978, at the Roberto Clemente Coliseum in San Juan, Puerto Rico. Gómez retained his title via fifth-round technical knockout (TKO). Many experts credit this fight as the beginning of the Mexico–Puerto Rico boxing rivalry.

== Background ==
The first world title fight involving a Puerto Rican and a Mexican involved Rodolfo Casanova of Mexico (29-3, 23 knockout wins coming in) and Sixto Escobar of Barceloneta, Puerto Rico (21-8-2, 7 knockouts coming in). This bout took place on June 26, 1934, at the Forum in Montreal, Canada and it was for the Montreal Athletic Commission's vacant version of the world's Bantamweight title. Escobar won the fight by ninth round knockout and thus he became Puerto Rico's first world boxing champion, being the object of a large welcoming at the San Juan seaport days later. Escobar later unified the world Bantamweight title with a win over Tony Marino.

Over the next few decades, Puerto Ricans and Mexicans fought each other sporadically, sometimes with world titles at stake. Such was the case when Carlos Ortiz fought Battling Torres and José "Pipino" Cuevas's three victories over Puerto Rican Angel Espada.

== The boxers ==
=== Carlos Zárate ===
Carlos Zárate of Tepito was born on May 23, 1951; he debuted as a professional boxer on February 22, 1970, with a second round knockout of Luis Castaneda in Cuernavaca, Mexico, and had a string of 22 consecutive knockout wins broken by Victor Ramirez, who went ten rounds before losing on points with Zárate on January 30, 1974, at Mexico City. He then won 16 more, all by knockout, to become 38-0, with 37 knockout wins, coming into his world title challenge of WBC world Bantamweight champion, the fellow Mexican Rodolfo Martinez. The Martinez-Zárate fight took place on May 8, 1976, in Inglewood, California. Zárate lifted the WBC world bantamweight title from Martinez by a ninth round knockout, therefore becoming a national hero in Mexico, where boxers, specially bantamweight division ones, were seen as popular role models by the public.

Before fighting Gómez, Zárate had to overcome another popular foe in WBA world Bantamweight champion, the also Mexican Alfonso Zamora, in a bout that took place on April 23, 1977, in Inglewood. The Battle of the Z Boys was a widely expected and hoped for fight that would unify the world bantamweight title but both the WBA and WBC withheld recognition of it as a world title fight. Zárate won the bout by fourth round technical knockout and was therefore, viewed by boxing fans and the press as the superior of the two reigning world bantamweight champions. By then he had another streak of knockouts that had reached 23 in a row by that point; he would keep defending his WBC world championship defeating the likes of Danilo Batista, future world champion Alberto Davila and Puerto Rico's Andres Hernandez, among others, while racking up six more straight knockout wins for his second knockout win streak to reach 29 in a row before the Gómez fight. Zárate was 52-0, with 51 wins by knockout, before the fight. Zárate was considered the number 1 boxer pound for pound in the world by Ring Magazine before the Gómez showdown.

=== Wilfredo Gómez ===
Wilfredo Gómez was born on October 29, 1956, in San Juan, Puerto Rico. As a teenager, he represented his home country at the 1972 summer Olympics flyweight competition in Munich, Germany, getting eliminated in the second round after getting a bye in the first round. He won, however, the world amateur championship in 1974 at Havana, Cuba. Having completed an amateur boxing record of 96 wins and 3 losses, Gómez became a professional boxer on November 16, 1974, relegated to a six rounds draw (tie) against Jacinto Fuentes in Panama City, Panama. Gómez lived in Central America during this period; he then won six in a row by knockout, including a rematch win against Fuentes, before debuting as a professional in his home country of Puerto Rico by taking out 14-2 Joe Guevara in six rounds, September 19, 1975, in San Juan.

Gómez faced Andres Hernandez and won by eighth round knockout in his next contest. Subsequently he would defeat another rival he and Zárate had in common, the future world champion Alberto Davila; Gómez beat Davila by ninth round technical knockout on July 19, 1976, at San Juan. There were talks of him challenging for one of the two recognized world bantamweight championships but his inability to secure a title shot at the bantamweight division led him to move to the recently recreated super bantamweight one.

Three more wins after the Davila bout, Gómez was 15-0-1 with all 15 wins by knockout when he challenged world champion Dong Kyun Yum, 52-2-6, for the South Korean's WBC super bantamweight title on May 21, 1977, at the Roberto Clemente Coliseum in San Juan. Gómez went down in round one but recovered to win the world title by a twelfth round knockout.

The world championship victory was followed by five defenses against Raul Tirado, former world champion Royal Kobayashi (this bout took place in Japan), Juan Antonio Lopez, Sagat Petchyindee in Thailand and a particularly hard defense against future WBA world champion Leo Cruz, who lasted thirteen rounds before being defeated in Cruz's adopted country of Puerto Rico. By the time Gómez fought Cruz the fight with Zárate had been signed for; it took place only one month and 19 days after Gómez-Cruz. Gómez was 21-0-1 with all 21 wins by knockout, making the pair a combined 73-0-1, with 72 knockout wins.

== Allegations before the fight ==
It has been alleged, including by Zárate himself, that Zárate suffered a cold or pneumonia during the week prior to the bout. Zárate said that he was only allowed to have orange juice the days preceding the fight. He went to a sauna and got inside a heated car in order to weight 122 pounds, or, in boxing jargon, make the weight, during the day of the fight. Zárate has claimed all of his bones hurt and that he wanted to postpone the contest but he was threatened with being sued for twice the money he was going to make shall he not fight that afternoon.

It took Zárate four tries at the scale to be at 122 pounds that day; Gómez himself also had trouble getting down to that weight but he made it on his second try.

== The fight ==
The first three rounds of the scheduled for 15 rounds fight were even with champion Gómez and challenger Zárate trading on even terms. By the fourth round, however, Zárate's conditioning began to tell and Gómez connected with a good right to the temple as Zárate backed to the ring ropes. Zárate kept marching forward but the backpedaling champion Gómez then landed a left to Zárate's chin that foresaw things soon to follow; seconds later, Gómez connected a pinpoint right to Zárate's chin while Zárate's left hook missed. Another left stung Zárate but he nevertheless calmly kept pressing Gómez until a big left by Gómez, who by now was near a corner, caught the challenger square on his chin and he went down for the first knockdown of the contest; Gómez tried to attack him as he was on the canvas but referee Harry Gibbs of England intervened, sending him to a neutral corner. Zárate got up and received a standing eight count but Gómez pursued him to the same corner immediately and began punishing him with punches to the head and body there. The challenger courageously threw right hand crosses to Gómez's head in a bid to stop the incoming champion but half a dozen rights from the Puerto Rican deposited Zárate on the canvas for the second time; this time near ring center. Zárate's body landed with such force that momentum carried him to near the corner contrary to the one he had been at seconds before, before he was able to get up. Before referee Gibbs could get to Zárate to administer another protective-and in this case mandatory-eight second count, Gómez, in violation of boxing rules, got to Zárate and attempted to hit his opponent again, but Gibbs was able to separate the boxers. To add to the confusion, the bell signaling the end of round four had apparently rung before Zárate's second fall but the sound of it was inaudible due to the roar of the crowd celebrating the fight. Gómez was so enlivened by the action that he almost refused to sit down on his corner during the rest period between rounds four and five; starting the fifth, Gómez landed three stirring lefts to Zárate's head but the challenger traded blows to the body with the champion before another left hook jarred his head back; Gómez then connected with a right to the chin making Zárate buckle his knees after landing on the ropes. Gómez wanted to keep hitting Zárate and he did but referee Gibbs was able to separate the boxers with Zárate's head between two of the ring ropes.

Zárate then moved to a corner where Gómez followed him; the champion connected with a right to the chin, sending Zárate down for the third time and the second official knockdown of the fight. Gómez then proceeded to hit Zárate with a right hand to the head as the challenger and world bantamweight champion lay on the floor. This caused controversy as many boxing fans and writers alike have said Gómez should have lost the bout by disqualification at that moment. Referee Harry Gibbs, however, apparently had not ordered Gómez to stop fighting, so he had no reason to disqualify him and he stopped the fight at that moment, Zárate's cornerman Arturo Hernandez having thrown in the towel to signify Zárate's team quitting, and Gómez retained the WBC world super bantamweight title by a fifth round technical knockout.

== After the fight ==
After beating Zárate, Gómez inherited Zárate's ranking as number one pound for pound on Ring Magazine. He won ten more fights in a row, all by knockout, before facing Salvador Sánchez for the latter's WBC world featherweight title. Among those ten contests, there were championship defenses versus Nestor Jimenez, Julio Hernandez, Carlos Mendoza, Nicky Nico Perez, Ruben Valdes, Derrik Holmes and Jose Cervantes. He lost to Sanchez by an eighth round technical knockout in what many Mexican boxing fans considered to be revenge for the win against Zárate; Gómez lost the Sanchez bout and with it, his ranking as the world's number one pound for pound boxer on Ring Magazine, but he returned to the super bantamweight division and proceeded to retain his title four more times, all by knockout including wins over Juan Meza and versus Lupe Pintor to establish the division's record for defenses at 17, all by knockout. That record and his 17 consecutive defenses won by knockout are boxing records that still stand, as of 2023.

Gómez later won the WBC world featherweight title by beating Juan Laporte, the fellow Puerto Rican who had won the vacant title after Sanchez had died, with a twelve-rounds unanimous decision on March 31, 1984. He lost that title to Azumah Nelson on his first defense by eleventh round knockout on December 8 of that year, then won the WBA world Junior Lightweight title by defeating Rocky Lockridge by a close, majority fifteen round decision on May 19, 1985. He also lost that title on his first defense, beaten by Panama's Alfredo Layne by ninth round knockout on May 24, 1986. After two additional wins, Gómez retired with a record of 44 wins, 3 losses and 1 draw (tie), 42 of his wins by way of knockout.

Gómez moved to Venezuela and ran into personal problems, including a stint in jail for drug possession, and a visit to a rehabilitation center in Colombia, but he rebounded, found religion in his life and in 1998 declared himself a newborn Christian.

In 1995, Gómez joined Zárate as members of the International Boxing Hall of Fame.

For his part, Carlos Zárate Serna, no longer undefeated, returned to the bantamweight division, where he made two controversial defenses. The first, against John Kohjo Mensan, was controversial because the challenger was alleged to be 45-2 coming in but was 1-4 instead. Zárate easily won this fight by a third round knockout on March 10, 1979. And, after a non title victory over debuting Celso Chairez, Zárate faced former stablemate Lupe Pintor, by then the number one bantamweight challenger by the WBC with a record of 38 wins and 4 losses, with 32 knockout wins. After dropping Pintor in round four, Zárate lost a split decision-and with that his WBC world title-that many observers thought he should have won; one judge gave him the fight by twelve points at 145-133 but the two other judges saw him lose by 143-142 scores each. Disgusted by the scoring of that bout, Zárate retired and bowed to never again return to boxing but he was forced to return in 1986 due to financial troubles. Zárate fought for world titles again twice but lost to Jeff Fenech, again attempting to become the WBC's world super bantamweight champion, by fourth round technical decision in Australia, October 16, 1987, and to Daniel Zaragoza by a tenth round technical knockout at the Great Western Forum in Inglewood, California on February 29, 1988, also for the WBC super bantamweight title which by then had been vacated by Fenech. Zárate won 66 fights and lost 4, with 63 wins by knockout.

Zárate also faced several personal problems: he eventually developed an addiction to cocaine which saw him lose his luxury home and boat; he had an estimated 18 million Mexican pesos at one time but owed 5 million pesos to the government, which added to his personal troubles. Zárate even tried to promote a series of programs and contests involving the giving away of boxing gloves signed by himself as well as fellow Mexican boxing legends Rubén Olivares and Humberto Gonzalez but, due to his instability, nothing came to fruition. Zárate considered committing suicide by jumping off a building, but he asked the WBC for help and was promptly put into a rehabilitation program. Zárate claimed that he recovered his family and has also become a newborn Christian. He also claims to have found happiness in life.

Carlos Zárate was inducted into the International Boxing Hall of Fame one year before Gómez, in 1994.

Zárate and Gómez, a frequent visitor to Mexico where he has been invited several times by the family of late rival Salvador Sanchez, became friends and Zárate has himself on occasion visited Gómez in Puerto Rico.
