= Zárate =

Zárate may refer to:

== Places ==
- Zárate, Buenos Aires, a port city in Buenos Aires Province, Argentina
- Zárate Partido, a political administrative division in Buenos Aires Province, Argentina
- Zárate–Brazo Largo Bridge, a set of road and railway bridges in Argentina
- Zarate, Álava, a hamlet in Spain
- Zarate, TX, a census-designated place (CDP) in Starr County, Texas, United States

== People ==
- Zárate (surname), list of people with this name
