= Jimmy Young (boxer) =

American boxer (1948–2005)

Personal information
- Born: James Young; November 14, 1948 Philadelphia, Pennsylvania, U.S.
- Died: February 20, 2005 (aged 56) Philadelphia, Pennsylvania, U.S.
- Height: 6 ft 2 in (188 cm)
- Weight: Heavyweight

Boxing career
- Reach: 74 in (188 cm)
- Stance: Orthodox

Boxing record
- Total fights: 57
- Wins: 35
- Win by KO: 11
- Losses: 18
- Draws: 3
- No contests: 1

James Young (November 14, 1948 – February 20, 2005) was an American heavyweight professional boxer. Young was known for his awkward, defensive style and counterpunching. He was one of the top contenders of the 1970s, losing a controversial unanimous decision against Muhammad Ali in 1976 and earning a victory over George Foreman in 1977. Young fought many other significant fighters of his era, including twice outpointing Ron Lyle and losing only by a split decision to then-number one contender Ken Norton in a title eliminator in late 1977. Fellow boxer Bobby Watts was his cousin.

== Career ==
=== Early fights ===
An inexperienced Young was matched against contender Earnie Shavers in what was only his 11th professional fight. Shavers, who at that time had a 42–2 record dealt Young his first knockout loss, being his 4th loss. Young had tried trading blows and was caught early on by one of the division's hardest punchers, who was well known for his overwhelming early attacks.

After this defeat Young went undefeated for the next three years, including a win over contender Ron Lyle and a controversial draw in a re-match with Earnie Shavers with many observers scoring the bout for Young. The improved outcome for Young was largely due to improvements made to his defense since his last fight with the devastating hitter. Despite Young's inability to earn a victory over Shavers, it was enough to earn him a title fight with the heavyweight champion, Muhammad Ali.

=== The Ali–Young fight ===
Young achieved widespread public recognition when he fought Muhammad Ali at the Capital Center in Landover, Maryland, on April 30, 1976, for the world heavyweight title, although boxing circles had already noted his ability. Ali weighed in at 230 pounds, the highest for any of his fights up to that point (he would weigh 236.25 pounds in his fight against Trevor Berbick), and was consequently slow and immobile throughout the bout. Seven years younger and 21 pounds lighter, Young adopted a strategy of fighting aggressively from a distance, landing numerous light blows while dodging and parrying Ali's counterpunches, and using his body blows, which had little power behind them but were effective at scoring points. At close quarters, Young would turn passive. In addition to retreating whenever possible, Young often kept his head ducked very low in order to deter Ali from landing blows at his head and risk censure from the referee for "rabbit punching". On several occasions when Ali was inside and Young had his back to the ropes, Young intentionally put his head or upper body out of the ring beyond the ropes to compel the referee to step in and separate the fighters. As a novel boxing tactic this divided opinion between its being a way of neutralizing Ali's game, to its being seen as an unsportsmanlike way of causing tactical stoppages every time Ali possessed an advantage. At one point during the bout the referee did initiate a count due to Young's being outside the ropes. The fight went the full 15 rounds resulting in a controversial one-sided unanimous decision in favor of Ali. Referee Tom Kelly scored it 72–65; judges Larry Barrett and Terry Moore had it 70–68 and 71–64, respectively.

Ken Norton, (a rival of Ali) who was commentating at ringside, had the fight even on his own scorecard. Former Ring editor Lester Bromberg called the decision a "travesty". New York Daily News reporter Dick Young said: "[Ali won] by the grace of three hero-worshipping fight officials. I believe many people, the voting officials among them, refuse to believe what they see when one of their super-heroes doesn't function as expected." After the match's televised broadcast, many viewers called to the network to complain about the decision, and Ali's career trainer Angelo Dundee went on record as saying this was Ali's "worst fight". After the match there were calls on Ali to retire from the sport from quarters of the sport's media.

=== Rematch with Lyle and then George Foreman ===
Young defeated Lyle in a November 1976 rematch by using clever defense and a fast offensive style. He was able to dominate the older fighter, with one judge's scorecard having Young winning 11 of 12 rounds.

In March 1977, Young then fought George Foreman in San Juan, Puerto Rico. Foreman was on a five bout win streak since losing the title to Muhammad Ali in "The Rumble in the Jungle", earning victories over top contenders Ron Lyle and Joe Frazier.

The Young–Foreman fight was somewhat steady until the sixth round. The early rounds were punctuated by complaints from Young and his corner about the use of elbows by Foreman, who was punished by the referee with a point deduction. For the first half of the fight, Young used his somewhat unorthodox boxing skills and good defense to keep out of harm's way, while using his punching speed to counter. In the sixth round he became somewhat more aggressive himself and landed a number of clean punches on Foreman. Eleven seconds into the seventh round, Foreman caught Young with a left-handed body punch, and immediately followed with a powerful swinging left hand to the head. Young reeled and turned away and seemed about to go down, while Foreman tried to pursue his advantage, but somehow Young survived to the end of the round. In his after-match comments on TV, he described it as "desperation". After the near knockdown Young rallied, and landed a number of good punches of his own. As the fight progressed Foreman's eyes became puffy and his punches lost their menace. For the rest of the contest, Foreman continued to move forward, trying to cut off the ring and looking for the big knock out, while taking punches from the elusive Young. In the final round Young managed a knockdown over Foreman, and earned a unanimous win by 12-round decision. The Ring named the Young–Foreman bout its 1977 "Fight of the Year". Young joined Ali as one of only two men to beat Foreman before his first retirement in 1977.

=== The Young–Norton eliminator fight ===
Now the number two contender, Young's next fight was a mandatory world title eliminator against Ken Norton, the number 1 contender. Young had won five straight since his loss to Ali.

Young lost the Norton match that occurred in November 1977 at Caesars Palace in Las Vegas, Nevada, in a controversial split decision. Many observers watching in attendance felt Young should have been declared the winner. While Young boxed cleverly, drawing Norton onto sneak right hand punches, Norton himself pressed forward dangerously, always his best style. The two had sparred when Norton trained for his second Ali match. Norton had found shots thrown first to the head rarely landed so he used a heavy two-handed attack pounding away to the ribs, then lobbing powerful head shots. The fight was set at 15 rounds. Although this was unusual for a non-title match, the format was adopted due to the bout's importance as an eliminator. Due to the importance of the fight, which was later retro-designated as a WBC title match, a large crowd gathered to watch the bout including then world champion Muhammad Ali. Although the winner of the fight was supposed to go on to fight for the heavyweight championship, Leon Spinks, who had won the championship from Muhammad Ali in an upset win on February 15, 1978, chose a rematch against Ali instead of fighting Norton for the WBC title. As a result, Norton was awarded the WBC championship belt

=== Later career ===
Demoralised at having lost another close decision, Young went into a gradual downward spiral. In June 1978 poor conditioning, an increasing problem, led to Young being outpointed by prospect Ossie Ocasio. While better in a direct rematch, in January 1979, Ocasio again earned the win and went on to fight the world champion Larry Holmes.

Young won a short three-round brutal battle with unranked Wendell Bailey, showing flashes of old form. But in other matches of note Young fared poorly. He was stopped due to cuts by new heavyweight contender Gerry Cooney after four rounds, in an about-evens fight, despite an attempt to rally, upon realizing the implications of his injury. He also lost on points to another rising prospect and future heavyweight champion Michael Dokes. In the 1979 match with Dokes, Young was out of shape due to lack of training and weighed 229 lbs., nearly the heaviest he had weighed throughout his career and around 15 lbs. heavier than his ideal fighting weight. However Young was able to slim down for his fight against British champion John L. Gardner, occurring in December 1979. Young outpointed Gardner, knocking him down in the 10th round. The triumph over Gardner as well as wins against Marvin Stinson and Jeff Sims were probably his last notable wins.

Starting in 1981 Young appeared to be making a comeback, winning five in a row, including a TKO over previously unbeaten Gordon Racette. In 1982 however, Young's comeback was cut short when he was defeated on points by future champion Greg Page. He became a "trial horse" for emerging contenders, dropping decisions to more future champions in Tony Tucker and Tony Tubbs. He continued fighting with mixed results until 1988, when he retired at the age of 39.

== Later life ==
After his boxing career, Young had financial, drug, and legal problems. During a court hearing on a drug possession charge, his Philadelphia public defender argued that Young had symptoms of chronic traumatic brain injury due to his time in the ring. At a boxing celebrity event, The Ring noted that Young apparently needed to be helped about by his family. He was reported as being afflicted with dementia pugilistica in his last years.

== Death ==
Young died at Hahnemann University Hospital, Philadelphia, at the age of 56 from a heart attack on February 20, 2005. He was interred at Mount Peace Cemetery in Philadelphia.

== Publications ==
- Jimmy Young, Heavyweight Challenger (1979), a biography by E. Dolan and R. Lyttle

== Professional boxing record ==
57 fights	35 wins	18 losses
By knockout	11	2
By decision	24	16
Draws	3	
No contests	1	

No.	Result	Record	Opponent	Type	Round, time	Date	Location	Notes
57	Win	35–18–3 (1)	Carl Porter	TKO	2 (6)	Sep 22, 1990	Mississippi Coast Coliseum, Biloxi, Mississippi, U.S.	
56	Win	34–18–3 (1)	Frank Lux	UD	10 (10)	Aug 13, 1988	St. Joseph Civic Arena, St. Joseph, Missouri	
55	Loss	33–18–3 (1)	Tim Anderson	SD	10	Jun 4, 1988	Lee County Civic Center, Fort Myers, Florida, U.S.	
54	Win	33–17–3 (1)	Rick Kellar	UD	10	Apr 9, 1988	Joplin, Missouri, U.S.	
53	NC	32–17–3 (1)	Mike Jameson	NC	2 (10)	Aug 9, 1987	Ginásio do Ibirapuera, São Paulo, Brazil	Referee decreed both fighters "faking"
52	Loss	32–17–3	Eddie Richardson	SD	10	Jan 7, 1987	Community Center, Tucson, Arizona, U.S.	
51	Loss	32–16–3	Chuck Gardner	UD	8	Oct 15, 1986	Medina Ballroom, Hamel, Minnesota, U.S.	
50	Win	32–15–3	Rocky Sekorski	MD	10	Mar 12, 1986	Metropolitan Sports Center, Bloomington, Minnesota, U.S.	
49	Win	31–15–3	Rocky Sekorski	UD	10	Jan 20, 1986	Marshall, Minnesota, U.S.	
48	Draw	30–15–3	Tony Fulilangi	MD	10	Nov 1, 1985	Veteran’s Memorial Coliseum, Phoenix, Arizona, U.S.	
47	Loss	30–15–2	Tony Tucker	UD	10	Sep 22, 1984	Ford Fieldhouse, Grand Rapids, Michigan, U.S.	
46	Loss	30–14–2	Tony Tubbs	UD	10	Apr 10, 1983	Hilton Hotel, Pittsburgh, Pennsylvania, U.S.	
45	Loss	30–13–2	Philipp Brown	PTS	10	Aug 29, 1982	Civic Center, Lake Charles, Louisiana, U.S.	
44	Loss	30–12–2	Pat Cuillo	PTS	10	Jul 13, 1982	Tropicana Hotel & Casino, Atlantic City, New Jersey, U.S.	
43	Loss	30–11–2	Greg Page	UD	12	May 2, 1982	Playboy Hotel & Casino, Atlantic City, New Jersey, U.S.	For USBA heavyweight title
42	Win	30–10–2	Tommy Thomas	UD	10	Nov 6, 1981	Civic Arena, Pittsburgh, Pennsylvania, U.S.	
41	Win	29–10–2	Tom Fischer	PTS	10	Sep 26, 1981	Caesars Palace, Las Vegas, Nevada, U.S.	
40	Win	28–10–2	Jeff Sims	SD	10	Jul 10, 1981	Auditorium, West Palm Beach, Florida, U.S.	
39	Win	27–10–2	Marvin Stinson	UD	10	Jun 30, 1981	Sands Casino Hotel, Atlantic City, New Jersey, U.S.	
38	Win	26–10–2	Gordon Racette	TKO	10 (10)	Apr 10, 1981	Frank Crane Arena, Nanaimo, British Columbia, Canada	
37	Loss	25–10–2	Gerry Cooney	RTD	4 (10)	May 25, 1980	Convention Hall, Atlantic City, New Jersey, U.S.	Stopped due to a cut over Young's right eye
36	Win	25-9-2	Don Halpin	TKO	2 (10)	Mar 8, 1980	Great Gorge Resort, McAfee, New Jersey, U.S.	
35	Win	24–9–2	John L. Gardner	PTS	10	Dec 4, 1979	Empire Pool, Wembley, London, England	
34	Loss	23–9–2	Michael Dokes	UD	10	Sep 28, 1979	Caesars Palace, Las Vegas, Nevada, U.S.	
33	Win	23–8–2	Wendell Bailey	TKO	3 (10)	Jun 22, 1979	Madison Square Garden, New York City, New York, U.S.	
32	Loss	22–8–2	Ossie Ocasio	UD	10	Jan 27, 1979	Roberto Clemente Coliseum, San Juan, Puerto Rico	
31	Loss	22–7–2	Ossie Ocasio	SD	10	Jun 9, 1978	Caesars Palace, Las Vegas, Nevada, U.S.	
30	Loss	22–6–2	Ken Norton	SD	15	Nov 5, 1977	Caesars Palace, Las Vegas, Nevada, U.S	
29	Win	22–5–2	Jody Ballard	UD	10	Sep 14, 1977	Caesars Palace, Las Vegas, Nevada, U.S.	
28	Win	21–5–2	George Foreman	UD	12	Mar 17, 1977	Roberto Clemente Coliseum, San Juan, Puerto Rico	
27	Win	20–5–2	Ron Lyle	UD	12	Nov 16, 1976	Civic Auditorium, San Francisco, California, U.S.	
26	Win	19–5–2	Mike Boswell	TKO	4 (10)	Sep 12, 1976	Utica Memorial Auditorium, Utica, New York, U.S.	
25	Win	18–5–2	Lou Rogan	TKO	2 (10)	Sep 2, 1976	Arena, Philadelphia, Pennsylvania, U.S.	
24	Loss	17–5–2	Muhammad Ali	UD	15	Apr 30, 1976	Capital Centre, Landover, Maryland, U.S.	For WBA, WBC, and The Ring heavyweight titles
23	Win	17–4–2	Jose Roman	PTS	10	Feb 20, 1976	Roberto Clemente Coliseum, Hato Rey, Puerto Rico	
22	Win	16–4–2	Al Jones	TKO	2 (10)	Nov 12, 1975	Arena, Philadelphia, Pennsylvania, U.S.	
21	Win	15–4–2	Bobby Lloyd	KO	5 (10)	Aug 26, 1975	Catholic Youth Center, Scranton, Pennsylvania, U.S.	
20	Win	14–4–2	Ron Lyle	UD	10	Feb 11, 1975	International Center Arena, Honolulu, Hawaii, U.S.	
19	Draw	13–4–2	Earnie Shavers	PTS	10	Nov 26, 1974	Capital Center, Landover, Maryland, U.S.	
18	Win	13–4–1	Jose Luis Garcia	PTS	10	Jul 6, 1974	Caracas, Venezuela	
17	Win	12–4–1	Les Stevens	PTS	10	Apr 22, 1974	World SC, Grosvenor House, Mayfair, London, England	
16	Win	11–4–1	John Jordan	UD	6	Mar 4, 1974	Capital Centre, Landover, Maryland, U.S.	
15	Win	10–4–1	Richard Dunn	TKO	8 (10)	Feb 18, 1974	World Sporting Club, Mayfair, London, England	
14	Draw	9–4–1	Billy Aird	PTS	8	Oct 23, 1973	World Sporting Club, Mayfair, London, England	
13	Win	9–4	Mike Boswell	PTS	6	Aug 14, 1973	Convention Hall, Philadelphia, Pennsylvania, U.S.	
12	Win	8–4	Obie English	PTS	6	Apr 23, 1973	Arena, Philadelphia, Pennsylvania, U.S.	
11	Loss	7–4	Earnie Shavers	TKO	3 (10)	Feb 19, 1973	Spectrum, Philadelphia, Pennsylvania, U.S.	
10	Loss	7–3	Randy Neumann	PTS	10	Mar 10, 1972	Madison Square Garden, New York City, New York, U.S.	
9	Win	7–2	Jasper Evans	PTS	6	Feb 12, 1972	Madison Square Garden, New York City, New York, U.S.	
8	Win	6–2	Lou Hicks	PTS	8	Oct 26, 1971	Blue Horizon, Philadelphia, Pennsylvania, U.S.	
7	Win	5–2	Andy Geiger	KO	1 (6)	Sep 27, 1971	Blue Horizon, Philadelphia, Pennsylvania, U.S.	
6	Loss	4–2	Roy Williams	PTS	4	Feb 22, 1971	Blue Horizon, Philadelphia, Pennsylvania, U.S.	
5	Win	4–1	Howard Darlington	PTS	6	Nov 24, 1970	Blue Horizon, Philadelphia, Pennsylvania, U.S	
4	Win	3–1	Jimmy Gilmore	PTS	4	Jun 22, 1970	Silver Slipper, Las Vegas, Nevada, U.S.	
3	Loss	2–1	Clay Hodges	UD	6	Apr 3, 1970	Coliseum, San Diego, California, U.S.	
2	Win	2–0	Johnny Gause	PTS	6	Dec 9, 1969	Blue Horizon, Philadelphia, Pennsylvania, U.S.	
1	Win	1–0	Jim Jones	TKO	1 (4)	Oct 28, 1969	Blue Horizon, Philadelphia, Pennsylvania, U.S.	
