= Andres Hernández =

Andres Hernández may refer to:

- Andres Hernández (boxer), Puerto Rican boxer
- Andrés Hernández Ros, Spanish politician
- Andrés Hernández (footballer), Venezuelan footballer
