= Muhammad Ali vs. Jean-Pierre Coopman =

Boxing competition

- On site programme
- Date: February 20, 1976
- Venue: Roberto Clemente Coliseum, Oriente, San Juan, Puerto Rico
- Title(s) on the line: WBA, WBC and The Ring undisputed heavyweight championship

Tale of the tape
Boxer	Muhammad Ali	Jean-Pierre Coopman
Nickname	The Greatest	The Lion of Flanders
Hometown	Louisville, Kentucky, U.S.	Ingelmunster, West Flanders, Belgium
Pre-fight record	49–2 (35 KO)	24–3 (13 KO)
Age	34 years, 1 month	29 years, 7 months
Height	6 ft 3 in (191 cm)	5 ft 11 1/2 in (182 cm)
Weight	226 lb (103 kg)	206 lb (93 kg)
Style	Orthodox	Orthodox
Recognition	WBA, WBC and The Ring undisputed Heavyweight Champion	

Result
- Ali wins via fifth-round knockout

Muhammad Ali vs. Jean-Pierre Coopman was a professional boxing match contested on February 20, 1976, for the undisputed heavyweight championship. Ali won the fight after knocking out Coopman in the fifth round.

== Background ==
This was Ali's first boxing bout after Thrilla in Manila, and fifth title defense since 1974.

The bout took place in Puerto Rico at the Roberto Clemente Coliseum and was televised in the United States live on CBS to an audience of over 40 million viewers.

== The fight ==
In the ring during the introduction, Coopman smiled easily while Ali stared at him. In his orange robe with a small black lion over the left breast, Coopman sat on the stool in his corner and appeared to enjoy Ali's attempted psych. But when the bell rang for the first round, the Belgian stopped smiling.

Ali had a 20-pound advantage in weight at 226 over 206 and a five-inch advantage in reach, in addition to his advantage in skill and experience. In the first round, he coughed twice midway through the round, then coughed up his mouthpiece near the end of the round. Ali was recovering from a recent battle with the flu.

Through four rounds, Ali was fighting in a flatfoot stance, peppering Coopman with flurries of punches. In the fifth, the champion started to dance, circling to his left, then to his right, and confusing Coopman with backhand jabs. Then Ali threw a big uppercut.

With a combination of punches, culminated by a right uppercut, the 29-year-old challenger toppled into the ropes. Trying to regain his equilibrium, Coopman wobbled back into the canvas in an apparent delayed reaction from the punch. Coopman was counted out by referee Ismael Quinones-Falu at 2 minutes 46 seconds. The referee and the two judges, Ismael Fernandez and Roberto Ranirez, each had rewarded Ali a 10–9 advantage in points in each of the first four rounds.

Moments later, Coopman was dragged to his corner, with Ali helping.

== Aftermath ==
About 20 minutes after the bout, Ali appeared in the interview area, dressed and relaxed. This was the first, and to date only, world heavyweight championship bout ever held in Puerto Rico.

In an interview, Coopman denied claims that he had been drinking champagne before the fight, but confirmed that he had drunk some champagne during the fight to help him move faster and to feel euphoric.

== Undercard ==
Confirmed bouts:

Winner	Loser	Weight division/title belt(s) disputed	Result
(Puerto Rico) Alfredo Escalera	(Dominican Republic) José Fernandez	WBC World Super Featherweight Title	13th-round TKO.
(United States) Jimmy Young	(Puerto Rico) José Roman	Heavyweight (10 rounds)	Unanimous decision.
(Puerto Rico) Wilfredo Gómez	(Jamaica) Cornell Hall	Middleweight (10 rounds)	3rd-round KO.
(Puerto Rico) Ossie Ocasio	(United States Virgin Islands) Lorenzo Simons	Unknown	3rd-round KO.

== Broadcasting ==
Country	Broadcaster
Australia	Seven Network
Brazil	Band
Canada	CTV
France	TF1
Germany	ARD
Japan	TBS
Mexico	Televisa
Philippines	RPN 9
Spain	TVE
United Kingdom	BBC
United States	CBS

Preceded by vs. Joe Frazier III	Muhammad Ali's bouts 20 February 1976	Succeeded by vs. Jimmy Young
Preceded by vs. Lisimo Obutobe	Jean-Pierre Coopman's bouts 20 February 1976	Succeeded by vs. Ba Sounkalo
