= Ken Norton vs. Larry Holmes =

Boxing match

The New Deal
- Date: June 9, 1978
- Venue: Caesars Palace, Paradise, Nevada, U.S.
- Title(s) on the line: WBC heavyweight title

Tale of the tape
Boxer	Ken Norton	Larry Holmes
Nickname	The Black Hercules	The Easton Assassin
Hometown	Jacksonville, Illinois, U.S.	Easton, Pennsylvania, U.S.
Purse	$3,700,000	$500,000
Pre-fight record	40–4 (32 KO)	27–0 (19 KO)
Age	34 years, 10 months	28 years, 7 months
Height	6 ft 3 in (191 cm)	6 ft 3 in (191 cm)
Weight	220 lb (100 kg)	209 lb (95 kg)
Style	Orthodox	Orthodox
Recognition	WBC; Heavyweight Champion	WBC; No. 2 Ranked Heavyweight

Result
- Holmes wins via SD (143–142, 143–142, 142–143)

Ken Norton vs. Larry Holmes, billed as The New Deal, was a professional boxing match contested on June 9, 1978, for the WBC heavyweight title.

== Background ==
Multiple-time heavyweight title challenger and number-one ranked contender Ken Norton earned his fourth world title shot after defeating the number-two ranked contender Jimmy Young by a close split decision in a 15-round "eliminator" bout on November 15, 1977. Though he was now mandated by the WBC to face Norton in his next defense, then-undisputed heavyweight champion Muhammad Ali had already agreed to face the winner of the Leon Spinks–Alfio Righetti fight that was scheduled on November 18, 1977, only three days after Norton's victory over Young, which Spinks ultimately won. The WBC threatened to strip Ali of their heavyweight title should he go forth with his planned match against Spinks instead of facing Norton, but eventually relented, instead sanctioning the Ali–Spinks fight as long as Ali, the expected winner, agreed to negotiate with Norton and then face him after his expected victory over Spinks. Two weeks after the WBC gave Ali that ultimatum, he officially agreed to a $12 million deal that would see him face Norton for what would be their second world title fight and fourth fight overall. However, these plans were cancelled when Ali shockingly lost to Spinks by split decision on February 15, 1978. Though Spinks was now obligated by the WBC to face Norton, he immediately pursued a rematch with Ali. Norton was given a lowball offer from Spinks' promoter Bob Arum of just $200,000 to accept a fight against Spinks. Though Norton stated he was "insulted" by the offer, he chose to accept it, effectively calling Arum and Spinks' bluff, who had hoped he would decline so they could pursue the lucrative rematch with Ali. A week after Norton accepted Spinks' offer, Spinks reneged and officially announced that he would make his first defense against Ali instead. One week after Spinks announced his intentions, WBC president José Sulaimán warned that Spinks would be stripped of their title if he did not agree to face Norton by midnight on March 18, 1978. When Spinks reaffirmed that he would still face Ali and not Norton, the WBC voted to strip Spinks of the title and immediately recognize Norton as their heavyweight champion.

Even before the Spinks–Ali rematch was made official, the WBC had sanctioned an eliminator bout between their number-three ranked contender Earnie Shavers and the number-four ranked contender Larry Holmes. As it was not known at the time who the winner would face, the fight's promoter Don King stated at the time that the winner would get a title shot "one of these days." On March 25, 1978, Holmes defeated Shavers, sweeping every round on two of judge's scorecards and all but one on the third scorecard. With Spinks now out of the WBC's plans by this time, this officially made Holmes the first challenger to Norton's title. The Norton–Holmes fight was somewhat overshadowed by the highly anticipated Spinks–Ali rematch that was scheduled that September, with the New York Times calling the fight "The Other Title Fight." As Norton had not won the title in the ring, he was derided as a "paper champion" by some in the media. Norton responded "How do I feel about being called the paper champion? Well, when you get down to it, it's all on paper anyhow. I said that if I ever became champion I would fight all comers and Larry Holmes is next up. I feel that Holmes is a better fighter than Leon Spinks." While Holmes chimed in "A lot of people ask me about fighting the paper champion, too, but right now Ken Norton is the champion and you have to respect him for that."

Norton entered the fight as a slight 6–5 favorite. Holmes, six years Norton's junior, disputed this telling the press "Norton is too old. I will outbox him. I'm not a devastating puncher, but the fight will not go 15 rounds." The fight was broadcast live in the United States by ABC, who estimated that some 40 million people would tune in to watch the fight.

== The fight ==
In an extremely close fight that went the full 15 rounds, Holmes earned a razor-thin split decision victory as two judge's scored the fight in his favor 143–142 while the third judge scored the fight the same in favor of Norton. Holmes got off to a quick start winning four of the first five rounds as he served as the aggressor while Norton took a more defense and tactical approach. As the sixth round began, Norton abandoned his defensive approach and began to dominate Holmes as he continuously advanced forward and landed punches on Holmes often, winning five of the next six rounds after his slow start whilst also opening a cut inside Holmes lip in the eight. With both fighters starting to tire, Holmes got back on track taking both the 12th and 13th rounds, staggering Norton twice in the latter. Norton then took the penultimate 14th round, staggering Holmes twice and landing a six punch combination just before the round ended. The two fighters entered the final round tied on the scorecards 133–133. Norton started the round strong, but Holmes rebounded in the latter part of the round resulting in him winning the fight.

== Fight card ==
Confirmed bouts:

Weight Class	Weight		vs.		Method	Round	Notes
Heavyweight	200+ lbs.	Larry Holmes	def	Ken Norton (c)	SD	15/15	^{Note 1}
Bantamweight	118 lbs.	Carlos Zárate (c)	def.	Emilio Hernández	KO	4/15	^{Note 2}
Heavyweight	200+ lbs.	Ossie Ocasio	def.	Jimmy Young	SD	10/10
Heavyweight	200+ lbs.	Alfredo Evangelista	def.	Jody Ballard	SD	10/10

^Note 1 For WBC heavyweight title
^Note 2 For WBC bantamweight title

== Broadcasting ==
Country	Broadcaster
Australia	Seven Network
Brazil	Band
Canada	CTV
France	TF1
Germany	ARD
Japan	TBS
Mexico	Televisa
Philippines	RPN 9
Spain	TVE
United Kingdom	ITV
United States	ABC

Preceded by vs. Jimmy Young	Ken Norton's bouts 9 June 1978	Succeeded by vs. Randy Stephens
Preceded by vs. Earnie Shavers	Larry Holmes's bouts 9 June 1978	Succeeded by vs. Alfredo Evangelista
