= Harry Gibbs (referee) =

English boxing referee and judge

Henry William Gibbs OBE (3 October 1920 – 16 November 1999) was an English boxing referee and judge.

Born in Bermondsey, London, Gibbs took charge of numerous world title fights, and officiated in bouts involving Muhammad Ali, Roberto Durán, Sugar Ray Leonard, Sugar Ray Robinson, Thomas Hearns, Mike Tyson, Barry McGuigan and Joe Frazier. He was the referee and sole judge of the fight between Henry Cooper and Joe Bugner in 1971, awarding the fight to Bugner by a quarter of a point, which remains one of the most controversial decisions in British boxing history. He was also the referee when Wilfredo Gomez beat Carlos Zarate in San Juan, Puerto Rico.

Gibbs was originally supposed to be one of three judges, alongside Dave Moretti and Lou Filippo, in the Marvelous Marvin Hagler vs. Sugar Ray Leonard world middleweight title fight in April 1987. Pat Petronelli from the Hagler camp objected to Gibbs being a judge in the fight, and he was replaced by JoJo Guerra, who scored the fight 118–110 for Leonard. Leonard won by split decision (118–110, 115–113, 113–115). Ironically, Gibbs, watching the fight at home, scored the fight 115–113 for Hagler.
