= Muhammad Ali vs. Jimmy Young =

Boxing competition

Muhammad Ali vs Jimmy Young
- Date: April 30, 1976
- Venue: Capital Centre, Landover, Maryland
- Title(s) on the line: WBA, WBC and The Ring undisputed heavyweight championship

Tale of the tape
Boxer	(United States) Muhammad Ali	(United States) Jimmy Young
Nickname	"The Greatest"	
Hometown	Louisville, Kentucky	Philadelphia, Pennsylvania
Purse	$1,800,000	$85,000
Pre-fight record	50–2 (36 KO)	17–4–2 (5 KO)
Age	34 years, 3 months	27 years, 5 months
Height	6 ft 3 in (191 cm)	6 ft 2 in (188 cm)
Weight	230 lb (104 kg)	209 lb (95 kg)
Style	Orthodox	Orthodox
Recognition	WBA, WBC and The Ring undisputed Heavyweight Champion	WBA/WBC; No. 3 Ranked Heavyweight

Result
- Ali won via 15 round UD

Muhammad Ali vs. Jimmy Young was a professional boxing match contested on April 30, 1976, for the undisputed heavyweight championship. Ali won the bout through a unanimous decision on points. This bout was aired live in primetime on ABC with Howard Cosell calling the action from the Capital Centre in Landover, Maryland.

== Background ==
The fight was Ali's sixth defense during his second championship reign. By comparison, Jimmy Young had a relatively unimpressive record, but had scored several big victories (most notable at this point was Ron Lyle), leading him to being ranked #3 overall heavyweight since 1975.

Ali did not believe Young would be a difficult opponent. Prior to the bout, Muhammad Ali's trainer Angelo Dundee put up a message board to Ali saying "Remember San Diego" That was when Ali, overweight, lost a 12-round split decision to Ken Norton on March 31, 1973, in that city, knowing just before this bout Ali trained lightly.

Ali came into the bout at 230 pounds, the heaviest he weighed for any fight until his final bout in 1981 when he weighed 236 pounds against Trevor Berbick.

== The fight ==
The fight was a hard-fought defense for Ali, who found himself struggling against the crafty challenger. Young's footwork and defensive skills made him stylistically difficult for Ali, and for most of the fight he did well against the champion.

During the bout on six occasions, Young ducked outside of the ropes when he began to be seriously pressured by Ali. This was done in the seventh, eighth, 12th, twice in the 13th and once more in the 15th round. When he did it in the 12th round, the referee ruled it an official knockdown and began to count. Young pulled his head back into the ring at the count of two. Young's decision to duck outside of the ring did not go over well with the judges, costing him points, and was one of the chief factors in his loss.

When the decision was made, the crowd loudly booed. Ali won by decision with the three judges voting for him.

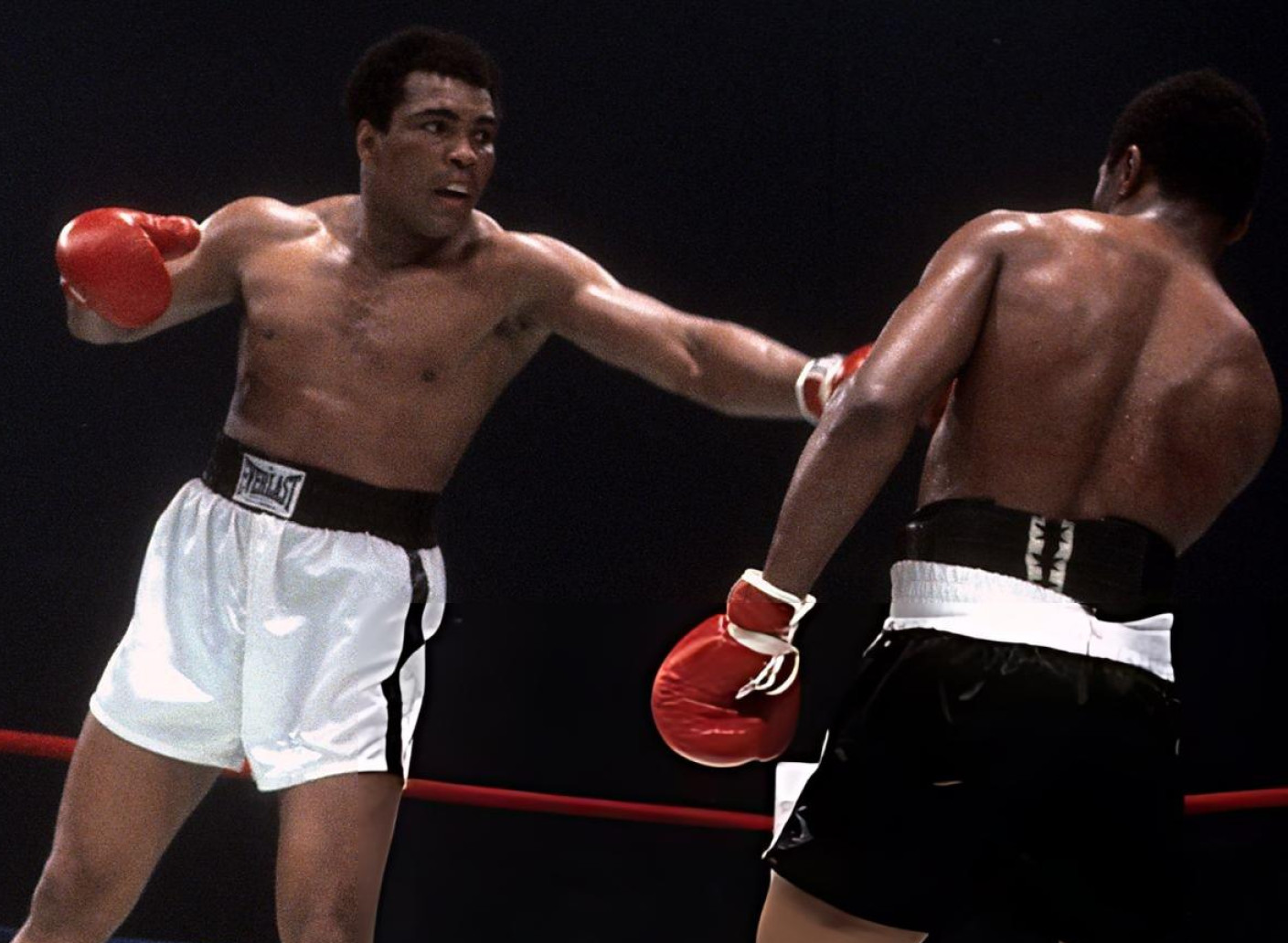

In the stats department, Young landed 222 punches to Ali's 113. Young outlanded Ali 65–27 in jabs and 187–86 in power punches. The punch disparity highlighted the booing at the judges decisions. Compubox points out that Young landed 41.1 percent while Ali only 18.9 percent of the shots. Ali's 113 punches we're the lowest Ali ever had in a 15-round bout.

== Aftermath ==
Howard Cosell, while commentator for Ali's rematch with Leon Spinks in 1978 believed that Ali's decline truly began to show with this fight. Although he would successfully defend his title four more times, three of them would also prove quite difficult for Ali, with this fight and his eventual third match with Ken Norton being among his most controversial victories.

Top contender Ken Norton, who was in attendance later stated,

He look pitiful. I kept hollering up to him. 'don't blow the money, Ali, don't blow the money damn it!' But the Ali you saw tonight is not the guy I have to fight. I wish I was, but it won't be. He'll be ready for me. You can count on it

— Ken Norton

Ali never rematched Young, although the latter would continue to rise through the ranks, with Young defeating George Foreman for the NABF heavyweight championship in 1977, but ultimately losing on a split decision in a title eliminator fight against Ken Norton later that year.

== Undercard ==
Confirmed bouts:

Winner	Loser	Weight division/title belt(s) disputed	Result
(United States) Ken Norton	(United States) Ron Stander	Heavyweight (12 rounds)	5th-round TKO.
(United States) Larry Holmes	(United States) Roy Williams	Heavyweight (10 rounds)	Unanimous decision.
(United States) Donald 'Biff' Cline	(United States) Jimmy Davis	Heavyweight (6 rounds)	2nd-round TKO.
(United States) Sylvester Bump Kelly	(United States) Lou Esa	Heavyweight (4 rounds)	4th-round KO.

== Broadcasting ==
Country	Broadcaster
Australia	Nine Network
Brazil	Band
Canada	CTV
France	TF1
Germany	ARD
Japan	TBS
Mexico	Televisa
Philippines	RPN 9
Spain	TVE
United Kingdom	BBC
United States	ABC

Preceded by vs. Jean-Pierre Coopman	Muhammad Ali's bouts 30 April 1976	Succeeded by vs. Richard Dunn
Preceded by vs. José Roman	Jimmy Young's bouts 30 April 1976	Succeeded by vs. Lou Rogan
