= Carlos Zárate vs. Alfonso Zamora =

1977 professional boxing match

The boxing fight between Mexicans Carlos Zárate and Alfonso Zamora, respectively the WBC and WBA World Bantamweight titleholders, was known as The Battle of the Zee Boys. Held in Inglewood, California, on April 23, 1977, the bout was not recognized as a unification fight by either of the sanctioning bodies without any specific reason given for withholding the sanction. As it turned out, the fight was one of the most-anticipated 10-round fights in history among boxing fans.

== Background ==
Alfonso Zamora was the first one of the so-called "Zee boys" to become a world champion, when he knocked out Soo Hwan Hong in four rounds on March 14, 1975, in Inglewood. He defended his title three times before Zarate had his first world title shot; one of his challengers was Eusebio Pedroza, the future WBA world Featherweight champion, whom Zamora defeated by knockout in two rounds in Tijuana on April 3, 1976.

Zarate, for his part, won the WBC world title one year and two months after Zamora became WBA world champion, on May 8, 1976, when he defeated defending champion Rodolfo Martinez by a ninth round knockout in Inglewood.

Zarate and Zamora were both once trained by the same man, Arturo Hernandez. But Hernandez sold Zamora's contract to his father, Alfonso Zamora Sr., and Mr. Zamora Sr. took this as a form of disrespect towards him and his son. Ever since, Zarate and Zamora's managerial teams carried on a war of words that was not missed by the Latin American sports media.

Zarate had a record of 45–0 with 44 knockouts, and Zamora was 29-0, with 29 knockouts. Their combined record of 74–0 with 73 knockouts arguably made for one of the most power-punch-packed matchups in boxing history. Fans in Mexico and the rest of Latin America were captivated by the announcement of the fight. The fact that both the WBA and WBC refused to recognize it as a world championship bout did little, if anything, to cool the ardor of enthusiastic boxing fans.

== The fight ==
The Los Angeles police department knew from experience, (such as the 1969 fight between Lionel Rose and Chucho Castillo, which was fought in Inglewood, and, much later on, the first bout between Riddick Bowe and Andrzej Gołota) that boxing fights can end up in riots. Because of this, they sent an anti-riot squad to the Inglewood Forum on the day of the event.

The anti-riot team would have to jump into the ring when, 52 seconds into the fight, an apparently drunk fan jumped into it with the apparent intention of attacking one of the combatants. The man did not reach any of the night's main stars, however, because five policemen were able to stop him, immediately taking him out of the arena. Zamora and Zarate began slugging right after that incident, with Zamora winning the first round on the judge's scorecards by throwing more punches than Zarate.

In the second round, Zamora appeared hurt after a right-and-left combination by Zarate, but he roared back to hit Zarate with a right-and-left combination of his own later in that round.

Round three was filled with combinations from both fighters. Zarate, however, began to connect with long jabs and short-range hooks. Zamora began to throw wide punches and seemed spent. He suffered a knockdown towards the end of the round.

By round four, Zarate looked stronger and fresher than Zamora. He kept attacking the WBA champion, who tried in vain to answer. Early in the round, Zarate dropped Zamora twice, and Alfonzo Zamora Sr. threw in the towel, giving Zarate a fourth-round knockout victory.

== Aftermath ==
Immediately after the fight was over, Alfonso Zamora Sr. and Arturo Hernandez had a fight of their own, and the anti-riot police once again intervened, putting a stop to the fight between Zarate and Zamora's trainers.

Zarate went on to lose to Wilfredo Gómez for Gómez's WBC World Jr. Featherweight championship. He defended his WBC World Bantamweight title five more times before losing it on June 3, 1979, to Lupe Pintor by a 15-round split decision in Las Vegas, Nevada. Admiration towards Zarate by boxing fans grew considerably after he beat Zamora. Zarate retired after losing to Pintor, but had a mildly successful comeback during the middle 1980s, going as far as challenging Jeff Fenech for the WBC World Jr. Featherweight championship on October 16, 1987, in Sydney, Australia.

Zamora's popularity was not diminished after losing to Zarate, but his self-esteem was. Zamora lost his WBA World Bantamweight title in his very next fight, being knocked out in ten rounds by Panamanian Jorge Luján on November 19 in Los Angeles. He only won four of his last eight bouts, retiring before the 1970s were over. A proposed "super-fight" against Wilfredo Gómez was mentioned early in 1983, but Zamora did not accept, as he had permanently retired from boxing.
