= Andres Hernández (boxer) =

Puerto Rican boxer (born 1950)

Andres "Puppy" Hernandez (born in 1950) is a Puerto Rican former professional boxer who once fought Carlos Zarate for the World Boxing Council's world bantamweight title. Earlier in his career, he was known for being able to take many punches. His boxing nickname is "Puppy".

== Beginning of professional boxing career ==
Hernandez made his professional boxing debut on June 22, 1969, when he defeated Willie Pastrana (not to be confused with Willie Pastrano, the former light heavyweight champion) by a four-round decision at Hiram Bithorn Stadium in San Juan. In his second fight, Hernandez lost for the first time, to another local prospect, Santos Luis Rivera, by a four-round decision. He avenged that loss in his very next bout, beating Rivera by a six-round decision in San Juan. After defeating Jose Rosado, he and Rivera had a rubber match, and this time Rivera won, again, on points over six rounds.

After a four-round draw (tie) against Tomas Rivera in Ponce, Hernandez reeled off a streak of eleven wins in a row, three by knockout. These included a victory over veteran Jose Luis Cetina (59-18-2 coming into their fight) in what was Hernandez's first fight abroad, held at the International Amphitheater, in Chicago, Illinois, United States, when he beat Cetina with a sixth-round knockout. The streak came to an end when he traveled to Panama to fight world-ranked Gilberto Illueca, and dropped a ten-round unanimous decision.

== Fight with Wilfredo Gómez ==
Hernandez then started another streak of wins, this time reaching eight consecutive victories before facing another up-and-coming Puerto Rican bantamweight, Wilfredo Gómez. The pair met on Saturday, December 20, 1975, at Roberto Clemente Coliseum in San Juan as part of a boxing program that included fights of Julian Solís, Larry Holmes and Roberto Durán defending his world Lightweight title in the main event against the Mexican Leoncio Ortiz. Despite the fact that Gomez had fought only 22 rounds in his first eight bouts (he was 7-0-1 with 7 knockout wins) for an average of slightly less than 3 rounds per fight, Hernandez put up serious resistance and went into round eight before Gomez could knock him out.

== Challenge of Carlos Zarate ==
After the defeat to Gomez, Hernandez won four bouts in a row, including a win over future title challenger Cleo Garcia of Nicaragua. This allowed him to challenge the WBC world champion, Mexican Carlos Zarate. Zarate was another heavy puncher who came into the championship fight, held at the Roberto Clemente Coliseum in San Juan on April 22, 1978, with a record of 49 wins and no losses, with 48 of those wins by knockout. The bout's referee was Richard Steele. Hernandez gave the champion a serious test, lasting until round 13 when he lost by technical knockout.

== National championship and career decline ==
Hernandez rebounded by outpointing future world title challenger Enrique Sanchez over ten rounds in Sanchez's home country, the Dominican Republic, but he followed that by losing by six round disqualification to Jose Jimenez, also at the Dominican Republic. He then fought Edwin Rivera (not to be confused with Edwin Luis Rivera. another local featherweight prospect of the time) for the vacant Puerto Rican bantamweight title on September 9, 1979, winning the title by a sixth-round knockout. This was, however, considered a mismatch by island boxing experts since Rivera was only 1-0 coming into that fight, compared to Hernandez's record of 29 wins, 6 losses and 1 draw (Rivera eventually retired with a record of 2 wins, 2 defeats and 1 draw).

On March 29, 1980, Hernandez challenged the future world Bantamweight champion Jeff Chandler for Chandler's NABF and USBA bantamweight titles at Resorts International hotel in Atlantic City, New Jersey Despite going the distance with Chandler, Hernandez lost a 12-round points decision in his last fight of major significance. He then went to South Africa to fight Bashew Sibaca at East London, Eastern Cape, but he would lose that bout by ten-round decision, before returning to the Dominican Republic to fight Sanchez in a rematch, this time being knocked out in three rounds.

Hernandez kept fighting, having bouts in Yauco, Puerto Rico and in Phoenix and Tucson, Arizona, Miami, Florida, Reno, Nevada, and Sacramento, California, where he suffered a first-round knockout at the hands of Henry Rodriguez, on December 18, 1985, after which he retired. He never again sought to fight on as a professional boxer, being able to stay in retirement.

Three of Hernandez's conquerors, Chandler, Gomez and Zarate, are members of the International Boxing Hall of Fame. Apart from those three world champions, Hernandez also faced 5 other boxers who participated in world title fights, these being Illueca, Garcia, Sanchez, Sibaca and Fred Jackson.

Hernandez had a record of 31 wins, 13 losses and 3 draws, 12 wins by way of knockout.

== See also ==
- Juan Carazo, another Puerto Rican who was close to winning a world boxing title
- Josue Marquez, another Puerto Rican world boxing title challenger of the same era
- List of Puerto Ricans § Sports
