= Leoncio Ortiz =

Mexican boxer

Leoncio Ortiz is a Mexican former professional boxer who once challenged Roberto Duran for the Panamanian's WBA's world Lightweight title, on Saturday, December 20, 1975, at the Roberto Clemente Coliseum in San Juan, Puerto Rico. Ortiz was beaten by a fifteenth-round knockout but he gained pundits and fans' respect by almost lasting the complete fifteen rounds distance against the hard-hitting legend. He was counted out by the referee when there were 12 seconds left in the last round.

In a professional boxing career that lasted from 1968 to 1984, Ortiz had a record of 41 wins, 18 losses and 4 draws (ties) in 63 contests, with 26 wins and 4 losses by knockout, including a victory over Rene Arredondo in the second of their two fights.

== See also ==
- List of Mexicans
