= Julie Zarate =

American artist (born 1970)

Julie Zarate (born 1970) is an American visual artist known for her acrylic and mixed media art. Known for her blend of classical and modern artistic styles, her work often features strong female figures and themes of women’s empowerment and culture. Her pieces incorporate vibrant colors and intricate details, often inspired by mythology, fantasy, and Chicana heritage.

== Early life and education ==
Zarate was born in Houston, Texas. Her family is fourth-generation Mexican American. She is one of five children of her parents, Richard Vale and Janie Vale. She now resides in Texas with her family. She began drawing from the early age of just three years old with books being one of her inspirations. One book in particular being 1,001 Arabian Nights.

Zarate attended San Jacinto College, as well as Houston Community College. Later, she attended the Glassell School of Art at the Museum of Fine Arts Houston, where she was given a scholarship. When it comes to her early art, Zarate has stated how it was influenced by popular culture and the empowerment of women. Yet, her art interest comes from the journey itself while creating a new piece. Her works also incorporate Zarate's own features, as she often uses herself as the model for her art.

== Career and exhibitions ==
Today, some of her work resides in the ChimMaya Gallery in Los Angeles, California. In addition to gallery exhibitions, her art has been featured in events such as the East End Studio Gallery’s Women of the West exhibit, which highlighted women in art and pop culture. She has also hosted art exhibitions, one of them being in M.P Baker Library for Hispanic Heritage Month in Panola College. Her distinctive style and strong feminist themes have earned her a growing following within the Chicana art movement.
