= Darío Zárate =

Argentine footballer

Darío Jesús Zárate
Personal information
- Full name: Darío Jesús Zárate Hernández
- Date of birth: May 22, 1979 (age 47)
- Place of birth: Córdoba, Argentina
- Position: Striker

Senior career*
Years	Team	Apps	(Gls)
1996–2002	Belgrano de Córdoba	?	(?)
2002–2003	Nueva Chicago	20	(0)
2003–2004	Belgrano de Córdoba	?	(?)
2004–2005	Racing de Córdoba	?	(?)
2005–2006	Talleres de Córdoba	?	(?)
2006–2007	Defensa y Justicia	?	(?)
2007–2008	Aldosivi	?	(?)
2008–2009	Defensa y Justicia	?	(?)
2009	América de Cali		
2010–	9 de Julio de Rafaela		
- * Club domestic league appearances and goals

Darío Jesús Zárate (born 22 May 1977 in Córdoba) is an Argentine footballer. He has played for a number of clubs in Argentina.
