= Ken Norton =

American boxer (1943–2013)

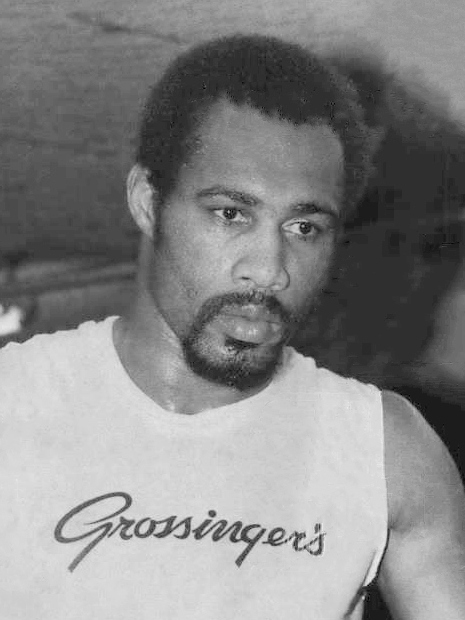
- Norton in 1976

Personal information
- Nicknames: The Black Hercules; The Jaw Breaker; The Fighting Marine
- Born: Kenneth Howard Norton; August 9, 1943 Jacksonville, Illinois, U.S.
- Died: September 18, 2013 (aged 70) Las Vegas, Nevada, U.S.
- Height: 6 ft 3 in (191 cm)
- Weight: Heavyweight

Boxing career
- Reach: 80 in (203 cm)
- Stance: Orthodox

Boxing record
- Total fights: 50
- Wins: 42
- Win by KO: 33
- Losses: 7
- Draws: 1

Kenneth Howard Norton Sr. (August 9, 1943 – September 18, 2013) was an American boxer who competed professionally from 1967 to 1981. He was awarded the WBC world heavyweight championship in 1978, after winning a close split decision over Jimmy Young in a title eliminator bout.

He is often known for his fights with Muhammad Ali, in which Norton won the first by split decision, lost the second by split decision, and lost the final by a controversial unanimous decision. Norton also fought Larry Holmes in 1978 during the first defense of his championship, narrowly losing a split decision and his WBC title.

Norton retired from boxing in 1981 and was inducted into the International Boxing Hall of Fame in 1992.

He also acted in a number of films.

== Early life ==
Norton was an outstanding athlete at Jacksonville High School in Jacksonville, Illinois. He was selected to the all-state football team on defense as a senior in 1960. His track coach entered him in eight events, and Norton placed first in seven. As a result, the "Ken Norton Rule", which limits participation of an athlete to a maximum of four track and field events, was instituted in Illinois high school sports. After graduating from high school, Norton went to Northeast Missouri State University (now Truman State University) on a football scholarship and studied elementary education. In an interview with ESPN Fitness Magazine in 1985, Norton said that he would have become a teacher or a policeman if he had not taken up boxing.

== Amateur career ==
Norton enlisted into the United States Marines Corps after leaving school, serving from 1963 to 1967. Norton was a manual morse intercept (MOS 2621), graduating from NCTC Corry Station, Pensacola, Florida. During his time with the Corps, he took up boxing, compiling a 24–2 record en route to three all-Marine heavyweight titles. In time, he became the best boxer to ever fight for the Corps and was awarded the North Carolina AAU Golden Gloves, International AAU, and Pan American titles. Following the National AAU finals in 1967, he turned professional.

== Professional career ==
Norton built up a steady string of wins, some against journeyman fighters and others over fringe contenders like the giant Jack O'Halloran. He suffered a surprise defeat in 1970 just after The Ring magazine had profiled him as a prospect, to heavy-hitting Venezuelan boxer Jose Luis Garcia, who was unknown at the time. Garcia floored Norton five times, before Norton was eventually knocked out. Norton overpowered and avenged his loss to Garcia in their rematch five years later, when both were rated contenders.

Norton was given the motivational book Think and Grow Rich by Napoleon Hill, which he said "changed my life dramatically. I was going to fight Muhammad Ali. I was a green fighter, but yet I won, all through reading this book." Upon reading Think and Grow Rich, he went on a 14-fight winning streak, including the shock victory over Muhammad Ali in 1973 to win the North American Boxing Federation heavyweight champion title. Norton said, "These words [from Napoleon Hill's Think and Grow Rich] were the final inspiration in my victory over Ali: 'Life's battles don't always go to the stronger or faster man, but sooner or later the man who wins is the man who thinks he can'." Norton also took a complete course by Hill on gaining wealth and peace of mind. "It can be related to anybody, to be the best in a career, to think positive", said Norton.

In an article which appeared in The Southeast Missourian Norton said, "One thing I do is only watch films of the fights in which I've done well or in which my opponent has done poorly." He also said, "In boxing, and in all of life, nobody should ever stop learning!"

=== Rise to prominence ===
==== Norton vs. Ali I, II ====
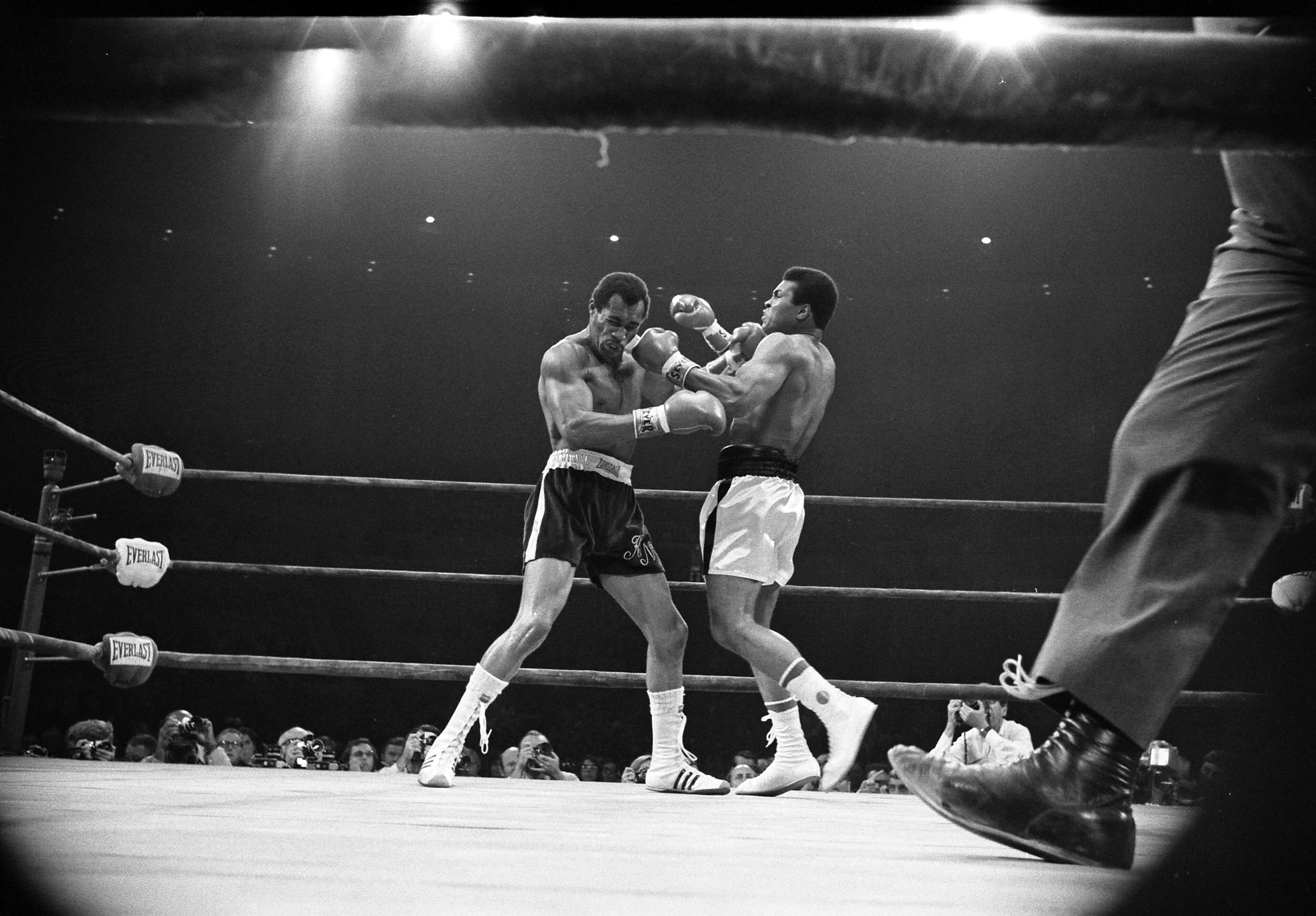
Norton vs Ali II

Norton's opponents were elusive in his early career. His first big break came with a clear win over respected contender Henry Clark, which helped him gain world recognition. His big break was when Ali agreed to a match. Joe Frazier, who'd sparred with Norton and defeated Ali, presciently said of Ali, "He'll have plenty of trouble!" Though both were top boxers in the mid-1970s, Norton and Frazier never fought each other, in part because they shared the same trainer, Eddie Futch, and also because they were good friends and didn't want to fight each other.

For the first match, on March 31, 1973, Muhammad Ali entered the ring at the San Diego Sports Arena wearing a robe given to him by Elvis Presley, as a 5-1 favorite versus Norton, then rated a number 6 world contender in a bout televised by ABC's Wide World of Sports. Norton won a 12-round split decision over Ali in his adopted hometown of San Diego to win the NABF heavyweight title. In this bout, Norton broke Ali's jaw in the second round causing Ali to fight defensively for the remaining 10 rounds. This led to only the second defeat for "The Greatest" in his career. (Ali's only previous loss was to Frazier, and Ali would later go on to defeat George Foreman to regain the heavyweight title in 1974.)

Almost six months later at The Forum in Inglewood, California, on September 10, 1973, Ali won a close split decision. Norton weighed in at 206 lbs (5 pounds lighter than his first match with Ali) and some boxing writers suggested that his preparation was too intense and that perhaps he had overtrained. There were some furious exchanges in this hard-fought battle. From Ali's point of view, a loss here would have seriously dented his claim of ever being "The Greatest". During the ABC broadcast of the fight, broadcaster (and Ali confidant and friend) Howard Cosell repeatedly told viewers a dancing and jabbing Ali was dominating the action despite Norton's constant offense and Ali's inability to penetrate Norton's awkward crab-like cross-armed defensive style. The close scoring and decision favoring Ali were both controversial.

==== Norton vs. Foreman ====
In 1974, Norton fought Foreman for the world heavyweight championship at the Poliedro de Caracas in Caracas, Venezuela, suffering a second-round knockout. After an even first round, Foreman staggered Norton with an uppercut a minute into round two, pushing him into the ropes. Norton did not hit the canvas, but continued on wobbly legs, clearly not having recovered. He shortly went down a further two times in quick succession, with the referee intervening and stopping the fight.

=== Career peak ===
==== Norton vs. Quarry ====
In 1975, Norton regained the NABF heavyweight title when he impressively defeated Jerry Quarry by TKO in the fifth round, although being hurt by a left-hook to the body in the second round. Norton would go on to dominate Quarry for the remainder of the fight, until the referee stopped the fight in the Fifth Round. Norton then avenged his 1970 loss to Jose Luis Garcia by decisively knocking out Garcia in round five, flooring Garcia five times with shots to the mid-section before Garcia was counted out.

==== Norton vs. Ali III ====
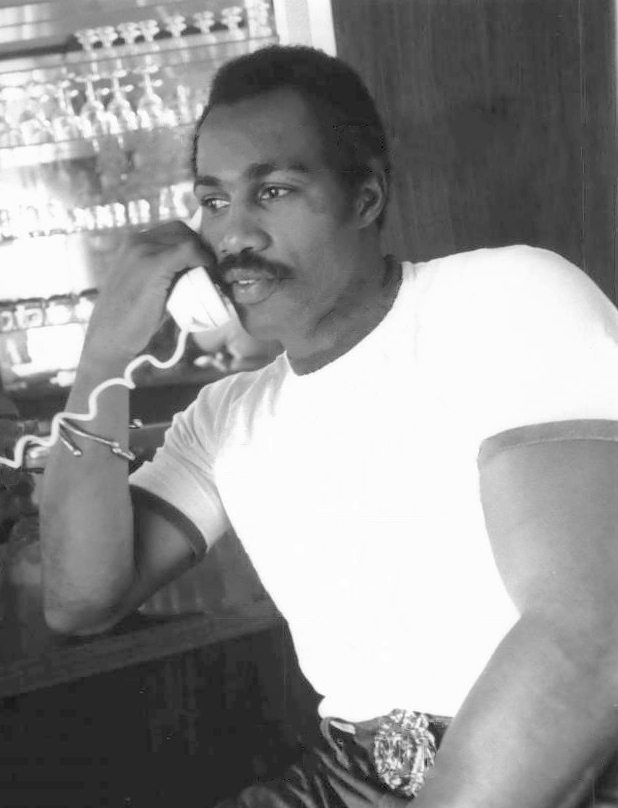
Norton in 1976

On September 28, 1976, Norton fought his third and final bout against Ali at Yankee Stadium in New York City. Since their last meeting Ali had regained the world heavyweight championship title with an eighth-round knockout of George Foreman in 1974. Many observers have felt this fight marked the beginning of Ali's decline as a boxer. The Norton bout was a tough bruising battle for Ali. In one of the most disputed fights in history, the contest was even on the judges' scorecards going into the final round, which Ali won on both the referee's and judges' scorecards to retain the championship. The two judges, Harold Lederman and Barney Smith, scored the bout 8–7 for Ali, while referee Arthur Mercante scored it 8–6-1 for Ali. At the end of the last round, the commentator announced he would be "very surprised" if Norton had not won the fight.

At the time of the bout, the last time a heavyweight champion had lost the title by decision was Max Baer to Jimmy Braddock, 41 years earlier. The January 1998 issue of Boxing Monthly listed Ali-Norton as the fifth most disputed title fight decision in boxing history. The unofficial United Press International scorecard was 8–7 for Norton, and the unofficial Associated Press scorecards were 9–6 for Ali (Ed Schuyler), and 8–7 Norton (Wick Temple).

Despite earning a victory, Ali received a pounding. His tactics were to try to push Norton back, but they had failed. He'd refused to 'dance' until the 9th. Norton has said the third fight with Ali was the last boxing match for which he was fully motivated, owing to his disappointment at having lost a fight he believed he had clearly won.

=== WBC heavyweight champion ===
==== Norton vs. Young ====
In 1977, Norton knocked out previously unbeaten top prospect Duane Bobick in one round. The fight had an interesting narrative to it, as Norton's previous trainer, Eddie Futch, opted to train Bobick instead of Norton. Norton then dispatched European title holder, Lorenzo Zanon in a 'tune-up' fight. Light-hitting but fast, Zanon was ahead on the scorecards until a barrage of right-overhands and looping-body shots put him down and out.

Norton then defeated polished number two contender Jimmy Young (who had beaten Foreman for the former champion's second loss, as well as twice top heavyweight contender Ron Lyle) via 15-round split decision in a WBC title-elimination bout, with the winner to face reigning WBC champion Ali. (However, Ali's camp told The Ring they did not want to fight Norton for a fourth time.) Both boxers fought a smart fight, with Norton using a heavy body attack whilst Young moved well and countered. The decision was controversial, with many observers thinking Young had done enough to win.

Although Norton was expected to face Ali for a fourth time, to fight for the WBC heavyweight championship, plans changed due to Ali's loss of his title to Leon Spinks on February 15, 1978. The WBC then ordered a match between the new champion and Norton, its number one contender. Spinks however, chose to face Ali in his first title defence, instead of facing Norton. The WBC responded on March 18, 1978, by retroactively giving title fight status to Norton's victory over Young the year before and awarding Norton their championship, which split the heavyweight championship for the first time since Jimmy Ellis and Joe Frazier were both recognized as champions in the early 1970s.

==== Norton vs. Holmes ====
In his first defense of the WBC title on June 9, 1978, Norton and new number one contender Larry Holmes met in a brutal 15-round fight. Holmes was awarded the title via an extremely close split decision. Two of the three judges scored the fight 143–142 for Holmes while the third scored the bout 143–142 for Norton. The Associated Press scored it 143–142 for Norton. The March 2001 edition of The Ring listed the final round of the Holmes–Norton bout as the seventh most exciting round in boxing history and International Boxing Research Organization (IBRO) member Monte D. Cox ranked the bout as the tenth greatest heavyweight fight of all time. Holmes went on to become the third-longest reigning world heavyweight champion in the history of boxing, behind Joe Louis and Wladimir Klitschko. Years later, Holmes wrote that the bout was his toughest fight of all his seventy-five contests.

=== Post-title career ===
==== Norton vs. Shavers ====
After losing to Holmes, Norton won his next fight by knockout over sixth-ranked Randy Stephens in 1978 before taking on legendary puncher Earnie Shavers in another compulsory WBC title eliminator fight in Las Vegas on March 23, 1979. Shavers took the former champion out in the first round. underscoring Norton's difficulty with hard hitters such as Foreman, Shavers and later Cooney. However Norton himself always denied this, saying that he was past his prime when he was stopped by Shavers and Cooney.

==== Scott LeDoux ====
In his next fight, he fought to a split draw with unheralded but durable lower ranked contender Scott LeDoux at the Met Center in Minneapolis. Norton dominated until sustaining an injury when he took a thumb in the eye in the eighth round, which immediately changed the bout. LeDoux rallied from that point and Norton became decidedly fatigued. Norton was down two times in the final round, resulting in the draw; Norton fell behind on one scorecard, kept his lead on the second, and dropped to even on the third (the unofficial AP scorecard was 5–3–2 Norton).

==== Tex Cobb ====
After the fight, Norton decided that at 37 it was time to retire from boxing. However, not satisfied with the way he had gone out, Norton returned to the ring to face the undefeated Randall "Tex" Cobb in Cobb's home state of Texas on November 7, 1980. In an all action back-and-forth fight, Norton escaped with a split decision, with referee Tony Perez and judge Chuck Hassett voting in his favor and judge Arlen Bynum giving the fight to Cobb. In the March 1981 issue of The Ring, Norton was still one of the world's top ten ranked heavyweights.

=== Final bout ===
==== Gerry Cooney ====
The win over the title-contending Cobb gave Norton another shot at a potential title-fight, and on May 11, 1981, at Madison Square Garden he stepped into the ring with top contender Gerry Cooney, who, like Cobb, was undefeated entering the fight. Very early in the fight Norton was buckled by Cooney's punches. Norton took a series of big punches from Cooney in his corner before Tony Perez stepped in to stop the 54 seconds into the first round, with Norton slumped against the ropes, leaving Cooney the victor by first-round technical knockout. Norton retired after the fight and turned to charitable pursuits.

== Boxing style ==
Norton was a forward-pressing fighter who was notable for his unusual crab-like cross-armed defense. The boxers that use this style are often called inside-fighters, swarmers, and crowders by boxing fans. In this stance, his left arm was positioned low across the torso with his right hand up by the right or left ear. When under heavy pressure both arms were brought up high across at face level while leaning forward, covering his head and leaving little room for his opponent to extend his arms. The guard was also used by boxers Archie Moore and Tim Witherspoon, as well as by Frazier in parts of his third fight with Muhammad Ali and Foreman during his famous comeback years.

Norton would bob and weave from a crouch, firing well placed heavy punches. He was best when advancing, unconventionally dragging or sliding his right foot behind him, relying on immense upper body strength to deliver his heavy blows. By comparison, most conventional boxers have elbows in at the torso with forearms vertically parallel to each another, the gloves being both near sides of the face and driving off their rear foot to deliver power punches.

Angelo Dundee wrote that Norton's best punch was the left hook. Many others lauded his overhand right. In a Ring Magazine article, Norton himself said that a right uppercut to Jerry Quarry was the hardest blow he recalled landing.

== Awards and recognitions ==
Norton was a 1989 inductee of the World Boxing Hall of Fame, a 1992 inductee of the International Boxing Hall of Fame, a 2004 inductee into the United States Marine Corps Sports Hall of Fame, and a 2008 inductee into the World Boxing Council Hall of Fame.

The 1998 holiday issue of The Ring ranked Norton #22 among "The 50 Greatest Heavyweights of All Time". Norton received the Boxing Writers Association of America J. Niel trophy for "Fighter of the Year" in 1977.

Norton also received the "Napoleon Hill Award" for positive thinking in 1973.

In 2001, Norton was inducted by the San Diego Hall of Champions into the Breitbard Hall of Fame, honoring San Diego's finest athletes both on and off the playing surface. Norton was also inducted into the California Sports Hall of Fame in 2011.

== Later media career ==
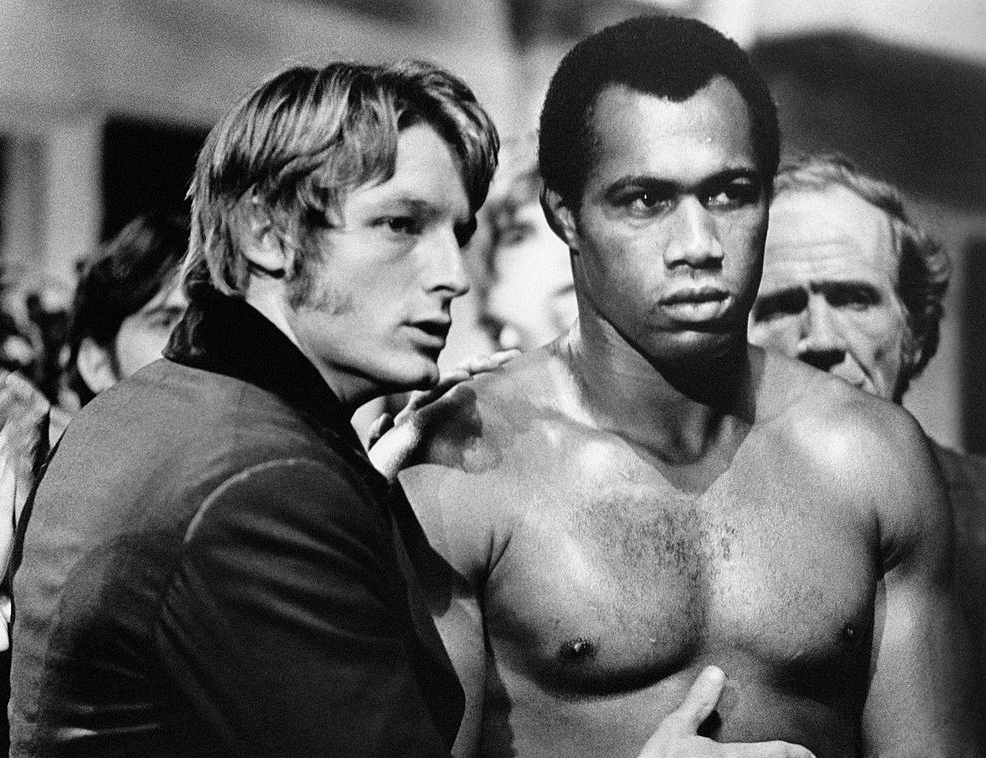
On set of Mandingo (1975) with actor Perry King

In 1975, at the peak of his boxing career, Norton made his acting debut starring in the Dino De Laurentiis blaxploitation film Mandingo, about a pre-Civil War slave purchased to fight other slaves for their master's entertainment. After starring in the 1976 sequel, Drum, Norton went on to play bit parts in a dozen other productions.

Norton worked as an actor and TV boxing commentator following his retirement from boxing. He also was a member of the Sports Illustrated Speakers Bureau and started the Ken Norton Management Co., which represented athletes in contract negotiations.

Norton continued making TV, radio and public speaking appearances until suffering injuries in a near-fatal car accident in 1986 which left him with slow and slurred speech.

He appeared along with Ali, Foreman, Frazier and Holmes in a video, Champions Forever, discussing their best times, and in 2000 he published his autobiography, Going the Distance.

== Personal life ==
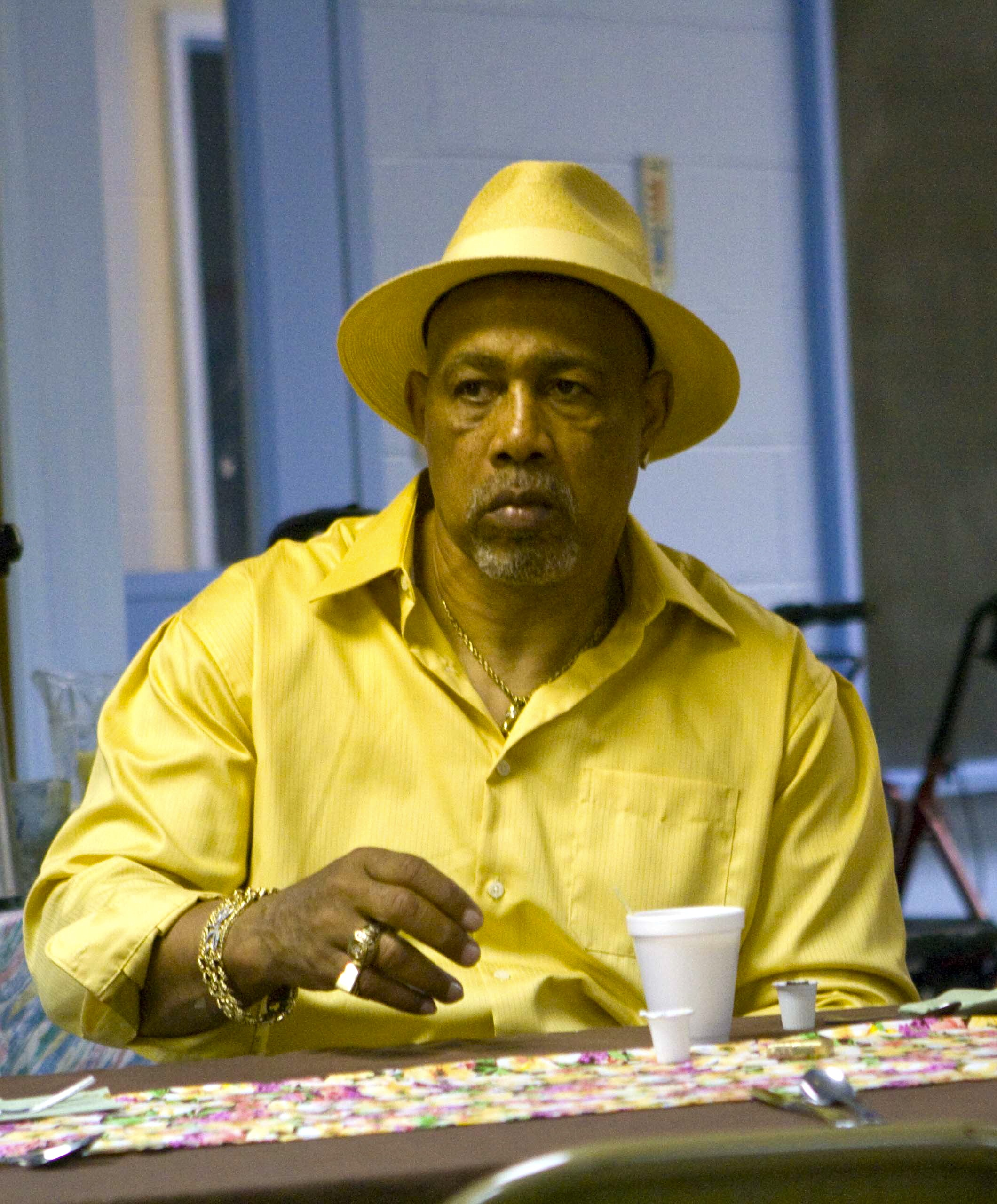
Norton in 2010

Norton was married three times and had four children. Prior to his first marriage, he had a son named Keith. He married Jeannette Henderson in 1966 while still in the Marines. The marriage lasted until 1968 and produced football player and coach Ken Norton Jr. In 1977, he married Jacqueline 'Jackie' Halton, who also had a son, Brandon, from a previous marriage. Jackie gave birth to daughter Kenisha (1976) and son Kene Jon (1981). They remained married for over 24 years before divorcing around 2000. Around 2012, he married Rose Marie Conant.

Norton was twice voted "Father of the Year" by the Los Angeles Sentinel and the Los Angeles Times in 1977. To quote Norton from his biography, Believe: Journey From Jacksonville: "Of all the titles that I've been privileged to have, the title of 'dad' has always been the best."

His second son, Ken Norton Jr., played football at UCLA and had a long successful career in the NFL. In tribute to his father's boxing career, Ken Jr. would strike a boxing stance in the end zone each time he scored a defensive touchdown and throw a punching combination at the goalpost pad.

Ken Norton's son Keith Norton was once the weekend sports anchor for KPRC in Houston, Texas.

Norton died at a care facility in Las Vegas on September 18, 2013. He was 70 years old and had suffered a series of strokes in later years. Across the boxing world, tributes were paid, with Foreman calling him "the fairest of them all" and Holmes saying that he "will be incredibly missed in the boxing world and by many".

== Professional boxing record ==
50 fights	42 wins	7 losses
By knockout	33	4
By decision	9	3
Draws	1	

No.	Result	Record	Opponent	Type	Round, time	Date	Location	Notes
50	Loss	42–7–1	Gerry Cooney	TKO	1 (10), 0:54	May 11, 1981	Madison Square Garden, New York City, New York, U.S.	
49	Win	42–6–1	Randall Cobb	SD	10	Nov 7, 1980	HemisFair Arena, San Antonio, Texas, U.S.	
48	Draw	41–6–1	Scott LeDoux	SD	10	Aug 19, 1979	Metropolitan Sports Center, Bloomington, Minnesota, U.S.	
47	Loss	41–6	Earnie Shavers	KO	1 (12), 1:58	Mar 23, 1979	Las Vegas Hilton, Winchester, Nevada, U.S.	
46	Win	41–5	Randy Stephens	KO	3 (10), 2:42	Nov 10, 1978	Caesars Palace, Paradise, Nevada, U.S.	
45	Loss	40–5	Larry Holmes	SD	15	Jun 9, 1978	Caesars Palace, Paradise, Nevada, U.S.	Lost WBC heavyweight title
44	Win	40–4	Jimmy Young	SD	15	Nov 5, 1977	Caesars Palace, Paradise, Nevada, U.S.	WBC heavyweight title eliminator; Norton awarded title four months later
43	Win	39–4	Lorenzo Zanon	KO	5 (10), 3:08	Sep 14, 1977	Caesars Palace, Paradise, Nevada, U.S.	
42	Win	38–4	Duane Bobick	TKO	1 (12), 0:58	May 11, 1977	Madison Square Garden, New York City, New York, U.S.	
41	Loss	37–4	Muhammad Ali	UD	15	Sep 26, 1976	Yankee Stadium, New York City, New York, U.S.	For WBA, WBC and The Ring heavyweight titles
40	Win	37–3	Larry Middleton	TKO	10 (10), 2:17	Jul 10, 1976	San Diego Sports Arena, San Diego, California, U.S.	
39	Win	36–3	Ron Stander	TKO	5 (12), 1:19	Apr 30, 1976	Capital Centre, Landover, Maryland, U.S.	
38	Win	35–3	Pedro Lovell	TKO	5 (12), 1:40	Jan 10, 1976	Las Vegas Convention Center, Paradise, Nevada, U.S.	
37	Win	34–3	Jose Luis Garcia	KO	5 (10), 1:50	Aug 14, 1975	Civic Center, Saint Paul, Minnesota, U.S.	
36	Win	33–3	Jerry Quarry	TKO	5 (12), 2:29	Mar 24, 1975	Madison Square Garden, New York City, New York, U.S.	Won vacant NABF heavyweight title
35	Win	32–3	Rico Brooks	KO	1 (10), 1:34	Mar 4, 1975	Red Carpet Inn, Oklahoma City, Oklahoma, U.S.	
34	Win	31–3	Boone Kirkman	RTD	7 (10)	Jun 25, 1974	Center Coliseum, Seattle, Washington, U.S.	
33	Loss	30–3	George Foreman	TKO	2 (15), 2:00	Mar 26, 1974	Poliedro, Caracas, Venezuela	For WBA, WBC, and The Ring heavyweight titles
32	Loss	30–2	Muhammad Ali	SD	12	Sep 10, 1973	Forum, Inglewood, California, U.S.	Lost NABF heavyweight title
31	Win	30–1	Muhammad Ali	SD	12	Mar 31, 1973	San Diego Sports Arena, San Diego, California, U.S.	Won NABF heavyweight title
30	Win	29–1	Charlie Reno	UD	10	Dec 13, 1972	San Diego, California, U.S.	
29	Win	28–1	Henry Clark	TKO	9 (10)	Nov 21, 1972	Sahara Tahoe, Stateline, Nevada, U.S.	
28	Win	27–1	James J. Woody	RTD	8 (10)	Jun 30, 1972	San Diego, California, U.S.	
27	Win	26–1	Herschel Jacobs	UD	10	Jun 5, 1972	San Diego, California, U.S.	
26	Win	25–1	Jack O'Halloran	UD	10	Mar 17, 1972	Coliseum, San Diego, California, U.S.	
25	Win	24–1	Charlie Harris	TKO	3 (10)	Feb 17, 1972	Coliseum, San Diego, California, U.S.	
24	Win	23–1	James J. Woody	UD	10	Sep 29, 1971	Coliseum, San Diego, California, U.S.	
23	Win	22–1	Chuck Haynes	KO	7 (10), 1:08	Aug 7, 1971	Civic Auditorium, Santa Monica, California, U.S.	
22	Win	21–1	Vic Brown	KO	5 (10)	Jun 12, 1971	Civic Auditorium, Santa Monica, California, U.S.	
21	Win	20–1	Steve Carter	TKO	3 (10)	Jun 12, 1971	Valley Music Theater, Woodland Hills, California, U.S.	
20	Win	19–1	Roby Harris	KO	2 (10), 1:35	Oct 16, 1970	Coliseum, San Diego, California, U.S.	
19	Win	18–1	Chuck Leslie	UD	10	Sep 26, 1970	Valley Music Theater, Woodland Hills, California, U.S.	
18	Win	17–1	Roy Wallace	KO	4 (10)	Aug 29, 1970	Coliseum, San Diego, California, U.S.	
17	Loss	16–1	Jose Luis Garcia	KO	8 (10)	Jul 2, 1970	Grand Olympic Auditorium, Los Angeles, California, U.S.	
16	Win	16–0	Ray Junior Ellis	KO	2 (10), 0:53	May 8, 1970	Coliseum, San Diego, California, U.S.	
15	Win	15–0	Bob Mashburn	KO	4 (10), 1:40	Apr 7, 1970	Cleveland Arena, Cleveland, Ohio, U.S.	
14	Win	14–0	Stamford Harris	TKO	3 (10), 1:59	Mar 13, 1970	Coliseum, San Diego, California, U.S.	
13	Win	13–0	Aaron Eastling	KO	2 (10), 3:06	Feb 4, 1970	Silver Slipper, Paradise, Nevada, U.S.	
12	Win	12–0	Julius Garcia	TKO	3 (10)	Oct 21, 1969	Coliseum, San Diego, California, U.S.	
11	Win	11–0	Gary Bates	TKO	8 (10)	Jul 25, 1969	Coliseum, San Diego, California, U.S.	
10	Win	10–0	Bill McMurray	TKO	7 (10)	Jul 25, 1969	Grand Olympic Auditorium, Los Angeles, California, U.S.	
9	Win	9–0	Pedro Sanchez	TKO	2 (10)	Mar 31, 1969	International Sports Center, San Diego, California, U.S.	
8	Win	8–0	Wayne Kindred	TKO	9 (10)	Feb 20, 1969	Grand Olympic Auditorium, Los Angeles, California, U.S.	
7	Win	7–0	Joe Hemphill	TKO	3 (10), 1:52	Feb 11, 1969	Valley Music Theater, Woodland Hills, California, U.S.	
6	Win	6–0	Cornell Nolan	KO	6 (10)	Dec 8, 1968	Grand Olympic Auditorium, Los Angeles, California, U.S.	
5	Win	5–0	Wayne Kindred	TKO	6 (10)	Jul 23, 1968	Circle Arts Theatre, San Diego, California, U.S.	
4	Win	4–0	Jimmy Gilmore	KO	7 (8), 1:20	Mar 26, 1968	Community Concourse, San Diego, California, U.S.	
3	Win	3–0	Harold Dutra	KO	3 (6)	Feb 6, 1968	Memorial Auditorium, Sacramento, California, U.S.	
2	Win	2–0	Sam Wyatt	PTS	6	Jan 16, 1968	Community Concourse, San Diego, California, U.S.	
1	Win	1–0	Grady Brazell	TKO	5 (6)	Nov 14, 1967	Community Concourse, San Diego, California, U.S.	

== Titles in boxing ==
Major World titles

- WBC heavyweight champion (200+ lbs)

Regional/International titles

- NABF heavyweight champion (200+ lbs) (2x)

== See also ==
- Tomas Molinares - another world boxing champion who never won a world title fight

== Bibliography ==
- Norton, Ken; et al. (2000). Going the Distance. Champaign, Illinois: Sports Publishing. ISBN 1-58261-225-0.

Sporting positions
Regional boxing titles
Preceded by Muhammad Ali	NABF heavyweight champion March 13, 1973 – September 10, 1973	Succeeded by Muhammad Ali
Vacant Title last held by Muhammad Ali	NABF heavyweight champion March 24, 1975 – January 1976; Vacated	Succeeded by George Foreman
World boxing titles
Vacant Title last held by Leon Spinks	WBC heavyweight champion March 18, 1978 – June 9, 1978	Succeeded by Larry Holmes
