= Jonathan Zárate =

Argentine professional footballer

Personal information
- Full name: Jonathan Gustavo Zárate
- Date of birth: 6 February 1999 (age 27)
- Place of birth: Mar del Plata, Argentina
- Height: 1.73 m (5 ft 8 in)
- Position: Midfielder

Team information
- Current team: Aldosivi

Youth career
- Aldosivi

Senior career*
Years	Team	Apps	(Gls)
2020–	Aldosivi	1	(0)
- * Club domestic league appearances and goals as of 12:44, 16 November 2020 (UTC)

Jonathan Gustavo Zárate (born 6 February 1999) is an Argentine professional footballer who plays as a midfielder for Aldosivi.

== Career ==
Zárate came through the Aldosivi academy. 2020 saw the midfielder move into the Primera División club's first-team, initially as an unused substitute for a Copa Argentina round of sixty-four defeat to Primera B Metropolitana's Talleres on 26 February. His senior debut arrived later that year on 14 November, with Guillermo Hoyos selecting him to come off the bench with twenty-six minutes remaining of a 4–1 home loss to San Lorenzo in the Copa de la Liga Profesional.

== Career statistics ==
As of 16 November 2020.

Appearances and goals by club, season and competition
Club	Season	League			Cup		League Cup		Continental		Other		Total	
Club	Season	Division	Apps	Goals	Apps	Goals	Apps	Goals	Apps	Goals	Apps	Goals	Apps	Goals
Aldosivi	2020–21 (Note: Soccerway counts Copa de la Liga Profesional appearances as league appearances.)	Primera División	1	0	0	0	0	0	—		0	0	1	0
Career total			1	0	0	0	0	0	—		0	0	1	0
