= Susan Zarate =

American costume illustrator

Susan Zarate is an American costume illustrator for the film and music industry known for her work on the films To Wong Foo, Thanks for Everything! Julie Newmar, Batman & Robin, Amistad, A.I. Artificial Intelligence, Anchorman: The Legend of Ron Burgundy, and X-Men: The Last Stand; the television series 24, under costume designer Jim Lapidus; and with costume designer Erin Lareau on Katy Perry's California Dreams Tour. She has worked with lead costume designers Milena Canonero, Ruth E. Carter, Michael Christiansen, Ingrid Ferrin, Shelley Komarov, Christopher Lawrence, Judianna Makovsky, Debra McGuire, Ha Nguyen, Bob Ringwood, Marlene Stewart, and Robert Turturice.

Zarate taught on the faculty of Otis College of Art and Design in Los Angeles, California.

Her sketch of a design for Julianna Margulies in The Newton Boys is included in the Costume Designers Guild collection of the Academy of Motion Picture Arts and Sciences.

== Filmography ==
- 2009: Hannah Montana: The Movie
- 2008: Tropic Thunder
- 2006: X-Men: The Last Stand
- 2005: Sky High
- 2005: Monster-in-Law
- 2004: Anchorman: The Legend of Ron Burgundy
- 2004: Spider-Man 2
- 2002: Solaris
- 2001: A.I. Artificial Intelligence
- 2000: The Flintstones in Viva Rock Vegas
- 1997: Amistad
- 1997: Batman & Robin
- 1995: To Wong Foo Thanks for Everything, Julie Newmar
