= Carlos Zárate Fernández =

Spanish cyclist

Carlos Zárate
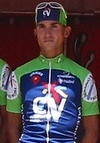

Personal information
- Full name: Carlos Zárate Fernández
- Born: 19 July 1980 (age 46) Puertollano, Spain
- Height: 1.80 m (5 ft 11 in)
- Weight: 68 kg (150 lb)

Cycling career
- Sport: Cycling
- Discipline: Road
- Role: Rider

Professional teams
- 2004–2005: Kelme-Comunitat Valenciana
- 2006–2007: Saunier Duval–Prodir

Carlos Zárate Fernández (born 19 July 1980 in Puertollano, Castile-La Mancha) is a Spanish professional road bicycle racer. He turned professional with Kelme in 2004 before moving to Saunier Duval–Prodir in 2006, where he stayed until the end of 2007.

== Palmarès ==
- Tour of the Basque Country – 1 stage (2004)
- Cinturón a Mallorca – 2 stages (2003)
