= Carlos Zárate Jr. =

Mexican boxer (born 1988)

Personal information
- Born: Carlos Jesús Zárate Scott; 23 May 1988 (age 38) Mexico City, Mexico
- Height: 1.80 m (5 ft 11 in)
- Weight: Light Welterweight

Boxing career
- Reach: 184 cm (72 in)
- Stance: Orthodox

Boxing record
- Total fights: 21
- Wins: 20
- Win by KO: 15
- Losses: 1

Carlos Jesús Zárate Scott (born 23 May 1988) is a Mexican former professional boxer. He is the son of former world boxing champion Carlos Zárate.

== Professional career ==
On 15 September 2009 Zárate Jr. won his pro debut against Miguel Ángel Tejeda by knockout, on a card that also featured Saúl Álvarez.

== See also ==
- Notable boxing families
