= Carlos Zárate (boxer) =

Mexican boxer

Personal information
- Nickname: Cañas
- Born: Jesus Carlos Zárate Serna; 23 May 1951 (age 75) Tepito, Mexico City, Mexico
- Height: 5 ft 8 in (173 cm)
- Weight: Bantamweight; Super bantamweight

Boxing career
- Reach: 67 in (170 cm)
- Stance: Orthodox

Boxing record
- Total fights: 70
- Wins: 66
- Win by KO: 63
- Losses: 4

Jesús Carlos Zárate Serna (born May 23, 1951) is a Mexican former professional boxer who competed from 1970 to 1988, and held the WBC bantamweight title from 1976 to 1979.

Zárate was voted Fighter of the Year by The Ring magazine in 1977. Zárate was ranked #21 in The Ring's list of 100 greatest punchers of all time. and voted as the #1 bantamweight (along with Rubén Olivares) of the 20th century by the Associated Press in 1999. In 1994, Zárate was inducted into the International Boxing Hall of Fame. He is also the father of once-defeated Light Welterweight prospect, Carlos Zárate, Jr.

== Personal life ==
Carlos Zárate has family members who have followed him into boxing. His son Carlos, now retired, fought in the Light Welterweight division and his nephew, Joel Luna Zárate, is the former WBO Latino Super Flyweight champion.

== Amateur career ==
Zárate, considered along with rival Wilfredo Gómez to be among the better punchers of the lighter divisions, had an amateur record of 33 wins and 3 losses, with 30 knockout wins, and he won the Mexican Golden Gloves, or Guantes de Oro, in 1969.

== Professional career ==
In 1970, Carlos made his professional debut with a 2-round knockout win over Luis Castañeda in Cuernavaca. That marked the beginning of a 23-fight knockout winning streak. The only boxers to get past the third round during that streak were Al Torres and Antonio Castañeda, who lasted 5 and 9 rounds respectively, both at Tijuana. Víctor Ramírez became the first boxer to last the distance with Zárate when Zárate beat him on points in January 1974 in Mexico City over ten rounds. Next began his second 20 plus knockout wins in a row streak, when none of his next 28 opponents heard the final bell on their feet.

=== WBC Bantamweight championship ===
After knocking out former world title challenger Néstor Jiménez in two rounds at Mexicali to end 1975, the WBC made Zárate their number one challenger at the Bantamweight division. So, after beating César Desiga by a knockout in four on March 29, 1976, in Monterrey, Zárate was faced on the night of May 8 of that year with defending WBC Bantamweight Champion Rodolfo Martínez in Los Angeles. Zárate became a world Bantamweight champion by knocking his countryman out in the eighth round. Zárate next won two fights by a knockout in the second and then defended it against Paul Ferreri, who lost by knockout in 12 in Los Angeles too. He finished '76 with a four-round knockout over Waruinge Nakayama in a title defense held at Culiacán.

=== Fight against WBA Bantamweight champion ===
After beginning 1977 with a third-round knockout win over Colombia's Fernando Cabanela in Mexico City, Mexican boxing fans started talking about a possible unification bout between him and fellow Mexican Alfonso Zamora, the WBA's world Bantamweight champion. Nicknamed by the American boxing press as The Z Boys, the two did square off, but not before much hassle and hurdle putting by both the WBC and WBA, who wanted both boxers to pay a large amount of money before sanctioning the bout. So, the California state boxing commission decided to sanction it as a ten-round, non-title bout instead. Fans didn't seem to care that no world title belt would be involved that afternoon, and they packed the fight venue when Zárate and Zamora met in the LA suburb of Inglewood, California, at the Forum on April 23 of '77. Zárate made the tactical mistake of going toe to toe with a shorter but harder hitting puncher. Zárate got tagged repeatedly and then a man wearing a white tank top and grey sweat pants entered the ring. The fight was momentarily stopped by referee Richard Steele and a contingent of helmeted policemen stormed the ring, forcibly removing the intruder thereafter, Zárate managed to stay away from Zamora. After a first round, Zárate the better boxer, with a reach advantage stayed away and outboxed Zamora wearing him down then knocking him out in four to gain recognition by most boxing fans as the undisputed world champion of the Bantamweights. Then, he retained the WBC title with a knockout in six over Danilo Batista, and finished 1977 with a trip to Spain, where he retained the belt against challenger Juan Francisco Rodríguez, beaten in five.

In 1978, Zárate started out by meeting future world champion Alberto Dávila, whom he knocked out in eight at Los Angeles to retain his belt. Then, in April of that year, he made his first of two trips to Puerto Rico that year, to fight challenger Andres Hernandez, who lasted until the 13th. round at San Juan's Roberto Clemente coliseum.

==== Zárate vs. Gómez ====
After retaining the title against Emilio Hernandez by a knockout in four and winning a non-title bout, Zárate announced he was moving up in weight and challenging the WBC Super Bantamweight champion, Wilfredo Gómez. According to many experts and the Ring Magazine book The Ring: Boxing In The 20th Century, Gómez and Zárate had the highest knockout win percentage of any two champions paired inside a ring in a world title fight: When Gómez and Zárate met on October 28, also at Roberto Clemente Coliseum in San Juan, the challenger and still world Bantamweight champion Zárate was 52–0 with 51 knockouts, while defending world Super Bantamweight champion Gómez was 21-0-1 with 21 knockouts. Zárate went to the floor four times and tasted the sour taste of defeat for the first time in his career when he was beaten by a knockout in five rounds.

==== Return to Bantamweight ====
In 1979, Zárate made what would turn out to be his last successful defense, with a third-round knockout win over Mensah Kpalongo in Los Angeles. After winning a non-title bout against Celso Cháirez by a knockout in five in Houston, Texas, Zárate met gym-mate Lupe Pintor in Las Vegas and lost a close and controversial 15-round decision. Enraged by losing a decision he (as well as many fans) thought undeserved, he announced his retirement from boxing and vowed never to fight as a professional again.

=== Five year retirement ===
Zárate spent five years in retirement, but the temptation of the public adulation boxers receive when they become champions and the aroma of the boxing ring led him back into competition as a boxer. Despite still retaining an acceptable amount of his boxing ability, Zárate was nonetheless, a shadow of what he was before his 5-year retirement. In his return bout in 1986 against Adam García, he won a four-round decision. 11 more victories in a row, all by knockout, including one over then number one world Super Bantamweight challenger Richard Savage (knocked out by Zárate in five in Mexico City), made him the WBC's number one challenger at the Super Bantamweight division once again.

And so, in October 1987, he traveled to Australia to meet the man boxing fans consider to be the greatest Australian world champion of all time: Jeff Fenech. In a fight contested for Fenech's world Super Bantamweight title, Zárate lost by a four-round technical decision. After Fenech vacated the title soon after to pursue the world Featherweight crown, Zárate and countryman Daniel Zaragoza met for the vacant world championship belt, but Zárate came back on the losing end once again, being knocked out in the tenth round and finally announcing his retirement for good.

During the 1990s he also became a member of the International Boxing Hall Of Fame, and in 2003, he and Wilfredo Gómez met at a boxing undercard in Puerto Rico to commemorate the 25th anniversary of their boxing bout.

He had a record of 66 wins and 4 losses as a professional boxer, with 63 wins by knockout.

Carlos Zárate was voted as the Greatest Bantamweight Ever in 2014 by the Houston Boxing Hall Of Fame. The HBHOF is a voting body composed entirely of current and former fighters.

== Professional boxing record ==
70 fights	66 wins	4 losses
By knockout	63	2
By decision	3	2

No.	Result	Record	Opponent	Type	Round, time	Date	Location	Notes
70	Loss	66–4	Daniel Zaragoza	TKO	10 (12)	1988-02-29	Forum, Inglewood, California, U.S.	For vacant WBC super bantamweight title
69	Loss	66–3	Jeff Fenech	TD	4 (12)	1987-10-16	Hordern Pavilion, Sydney, New South Wales, Australia	For WBC super bantamweight title
68	Win	66–2	Richard Savage	TKO	5 (10)	1987-08-15	Mexico City, Distrito Federal, Mexico	
67	Win	65–2	Tony Montoya	TKO	3 (10)	1987-06-19	Civic Auditorium, San Jose, California, U.S.	
66	Win	64–2	John Boyd	TKO	5 (10)	1987-05-05	Sports Arena, Los Angeles, California, U.S.	
65	Win	63–2	Francis Childs	KO	4 (10)	1987-02-20	Civic Auditorium, San Jose, California, U.S.	
64	Win	62–2	Alex Galván	TKO	7 (10)	1986-12-13	Convention Center, Fresno, California, U.S.	
63	Win	61–2	Edward Rodriquez	TKO	3 (10)	1986-11-21	Civic Auditorium, San Jose, California, U.S.	
62	Win	60–2	Gerardo Esparza	KO	5 (8)	1986-09-13	Guadalajara, Jalisco, Mexico	
61	Win	59–2	Alejandro García	KO	2 (10)	1986-07-19	Ciudad Juarez, Chihuahua, Mexico	
60	Win	58–2	Jesus Muñiz	UD	10	1986-05-23	Aragon Ballroom, Chicago, Illinois, U.S.	
59	Win	57–2	Héctor Nápoles	KO	2 (8)	1986-05-05	Auditorio Municipal, Torreon, Coahuila de Zaragoza, Mexico	
58	Win	56–2	Jose de la Dora	KO	3 (6)	1986-04-12	Zacapu, Michoacán, Mexico	
57	Win	55–2	Adam García	MD	4	1986-02-25	Forum, Inglewood, California, U.S.	
56	Loss	54–2	Lupe Pintor	SD	15	1979-06-03	Caesars Palace, Sports Pavilion, Paradise, Nevada, U.S.	Lost WBC bantamweight title
55	Win	54–1	Celso Chairez	TKO	5 (10)	1979-05-01	Sam Houston Coliseum, Houston, Texas, U.S.	
54	Win	53–1	John Kodjo Mensah	KO	3 (15)	1979-03-10	Forum, Inglewood, California, U.S.	Retained WBC bantamweight title
53	Loss	52–1	Wilfredo Gómez	TKO	5 (15)	1978-10-28	Roberto Clemente Coliseum, San Juan, Puerto Rico	For WBC super bantamweight title
52	Win	52–0	Rudy González	TKO	4 (10)	1978-09-30	Matamoros, Tamaulipas, Mexico	
51	Win	51–0	Emilio Hernández	KO	4 (15)	Jun 9, 1978	Caesars Palace, Sports Pavilion, Paradise, Nevada, U.S.	Retained WBC bantamweight title
50	Win	50–0	Andres Hernández	TKO	13 (15)	1978-04-22	Roberto Clemente Coliseum, San Juan, Puerto Rico	Retained WBC bantamweight title
49	Win	49–0	Alberto Dávila	TKO	8 (15)	1978-02-25	Forum, Inglewood, California, U.S.	Retained WBC bantamweight title
48	Win	48–0	Juan Francisco Rodríguez	TKO	5 (15)	1977-12-02	Palacio de los Deportes, Madrid, Spain	Retained WBC bantamweight title
47	Win	47–0	Danilo Batista	KO	6 (15)	1977-10-29	Forum, Inglewood, California, U.S.	Retained WBC bantamweight title
46	Win	46–0	Alfonso Zamora	TKO	4 (15)	1977-04-23	Forum, Inglewood, California, U.S.	
45	Win	45–0	Fernando Cabanela	TKO	3 (15)	1977-02-05	Toreo de Cuatro Caminos, Mexico City, Distrito Federal, Mexico	Retained WBC bantamweight title
44	Win	44–0	Waruinge Nakayama	KO	4 (15)	1976-11-13	Estadio General Ángel Flores, Culiacan, Sinaloa, Mexico	Retained WBC bantamweight title
43	Win	43–0	Paul Ferreri	TKO	12 (15)	1976-08-28	Forum, Inglewood, California, U.S.	Retained WBC bantamweight title
42	Win	42–0	Antonio Paredes	TKO	2 (10)	1976-08-02	Chihuahua City, Chihuahua, Mexico	
41	Win	41–0	Félix Llanos	KO	2 (10)	1976-06-26	Plaza de Toros Calafia, Mexicali, Baja California, Mexico	
40	Win	40–0	Rodolfo Martínez	KO	9 (15)	1976-05-08	Forum, Inglewood, California, U.S.	Won WBC bantamweight title
39	Win	39–0	César Deciga	TKO	4 (10)	1976-03-27	Plaza de Toros Monumental, Monterrey, Nuevo León, Mexico	
38	Win	38–0	Néstor Jiménez	KO	2 (10)	1975-12-07	Plaza de Toros Calafia, Mexicali, Baja California, Mexico	
37	Win	37–0	Jorge Torres	TKO	8 (10)	1975-10-11	Auditorio Benito Juarez, Guadalajara, Jalisco, Mexico	
36	Win	36–0	Benicio Segundo Sosa	TKO	4 (10)	1975-09-20	Forum, Inglewood, California, U.S.	
35	Win	35–0	José Sánchez	TKO	3 (8)	1975-08-16	Mexico City, Distrito Federal, Mexico	
34	Win	34–0	Orlando Amores	KO	3 (10)	1975-06-20	Forum, Inglewood, California, U.S.	
33	Win	33–0	Joe Guevara	RTD	3 (12)	1975-03-14	Forum, Inglewood, California, U.S.	California State Athletic Commission bantamweight title
32	Win	32–0	Alberto Cabanig	TKO	4 (10)	1975-02-04	Arena Coliseo, Ciudad Victoria, Tamaulipas, Mexico	
31	Win	31–0	James Martinez	TKO	7 (10)	1974-11-23	Forum, Inglewood, California, U.S.	
30	Win	30–0	Francisco Cruz	TKO	2 (10)	1974-10-27	Gimnasio de Mexicali, Mexicali, Baja California, Mexico	
29	Win	29–0	Magallo Lozada	TKO	5 (10)	1974-08-03	Palacio de los Deportes, Mexico City, Distrito Federal, Mexico	
28	Win	28–0	Juan Ordoñez	KO	3 (10)	1974-05-25	Palacio de los Deportes, Mexico City, Distrito Federal, Mexico	
27	Win	27–0	Chamaco Limón	KO	3 (10)	1974-05-03	Monterrey, Nuevo León, Mexico	
26	Win	26–0	Alfonso Ibarra	KO	2 (10)	1974-04-09	Arena Tijuana 72, Tijuana, Baja California, Mexico	
25	Win	25–0	Carlos Armenta	KO	1 (10)	1974-02-22	Auditorio Matamoros, Matamoros, Tamaulipas, Mexico	
24	Win	24–0	Víctor Ramírez	UD	10	1974-01-30	Mexico City, Distrito Federal, Mexico	
23	Win	23–0	Sixto Pérez	KO	2 (8)	1973-12-11	Arena Tijuana 72, Tijuana, Baja California, Mexico	
22	Win	22–0	Eduardo Miranda	KO	5 (10)	1973-11-01	Tijuana, Baja California, Mexico	
21	Win	21–0	Antonio Castañeda	TKO	9 (10)	1973-10-02	Arena Tijuana 72, Tijuana, Baja California, Mexico	
20	Win	20–0	Alberto Torres	TKO	5 (10)	1973-08-21	Arena Tijuana 72, Tijuana, Baja California, Mexico	
19	Win	19–0	Francisco Pino	KO	2 (10)	1973-07-12	Cuernavaca, Morelos, Mexico	
18	Win	18–0	Juan Ramón Pérez	KO	2 (10)	1973-06-02	La Paz, Baja California Sur, Mexico	
17	Win	17–0	Juan Ramón Pérez	KO	2 (8)	1972-12-03	La Paz, Baja California Sur, Mexico	
16	Win	16–0	Armando Carrasco	KO	2 (8)	1972-10-31	Villahermosa, Tabasco, Mexico	
15	Win	15–0	Angel Patiño	KO	2 (8)	1972-10-08	Ciudad Madero, Tamaulipas, Mexico	
14	Win	14–0	Jesús Escobedo	KO	2 (8)	1972-08-19	Monterrey, Nuevo León, Mexico	
13	Win	13–0	José Luis Morales	TKO	2 (8)	1972-03-19	Toreo de Cuatro Caminos, Mexico City, Distrito Federal, Mexico	
12	Win	12–0	José González	KO	2 (8)	1972-02-07	Tampico, Tamaulipas, Mexico	
11	Win	11–0	Emiliano Mayoral	TKO	3 (8)	1972-01-28	Acapulco, Guerrero, Mexico	
10	Win	10–0	Victor Nava	KO	3 (8)	1971-11-26	Acapulco, Guerrero, Mexico	
9	Win	9–0	Julio Martínez	KO	2 (8)	1971-08-07	Morelia, Michoacán, Mexico	
8	Win	8–0	Ramón Pinedo	KO	2 (6)	1971-05-05	Cuernavaca, Morelos, Mexico	
7	Win	7–0	Fermín Ramos	KO	2 (6)	1971-03-20	Toluca, México State, Mexico	
6	Win	6–0	Antonio Lucas	KO	3 (6)	1971-02-15	Cuernavaca, Morelos, Mexico	
5	Win	5–0	Alfredo Pérez	KO	2 (6)	1970-12-18	Acapulco, Guerrero, Mexico	
4	Win	4–0	Nuno Temix	TKO	3 (6)	1970-11-17	Villahermosa, Tabasco, Mexico	
3	Win	3–0	Costeñito Sotelo	KO	2 (4)	1970-04-01	Villahermosa, Tabasco, Mexico	
2	Win	2–0	José Pavón	KO	1 (4)	1970-03-02	Cuernavaca, Morelos, Mexico	
1	Win	1–0	Luis Castañeda	KO	3 (4)	1970-02-02	Cuernavaca, Morelos, Mexico	

== See also ==
- List of world bantamweight boxing champions
- List of Mexican boxing world champions
- Notable boxing families

Sporting positions
World boxing titles
Preceded by Rodolfo Martínez	WBC bantamweight champion 8 May 1976 – 3 June 1979	Succeeded by Lupe Pintor
