= Roberto Clemente Coliseum =

Coliseum in Puerto Rico

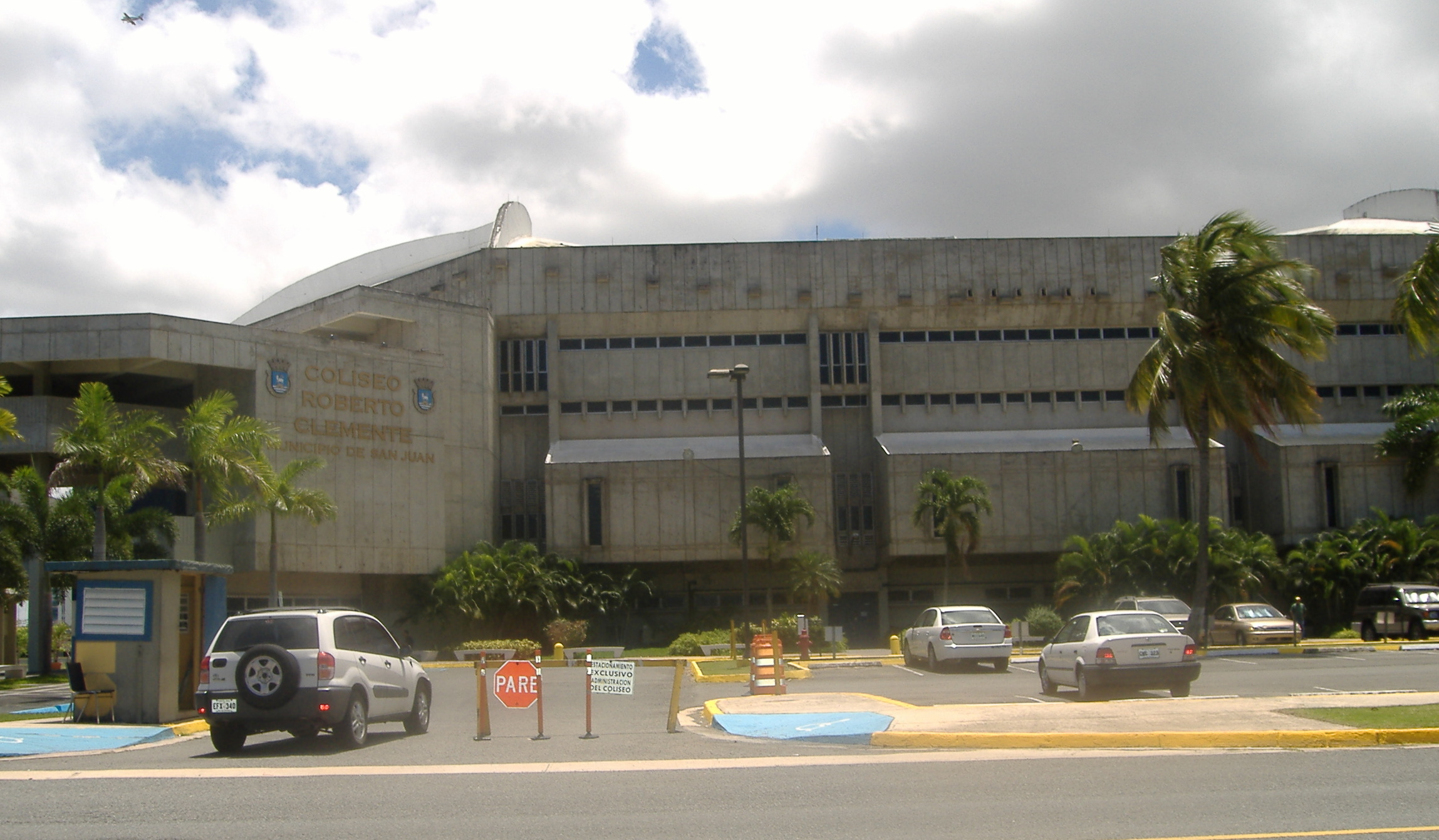
- The Roberto Clemente Coliseum in 2007
- Interactive map of Roberto Clemente Coliseum
- Location: Franklin Delano Roosevelt Ave. Oriente, San Juan, Puerto Rico
- Coordinates: 18.4159°N 66.0754°W
- Owner: San Juan Municipality
- Operator: San Juan Municipality
- Capacity: 12,500

Construction
- Opened: February 1, 1973; 53 years ago

Tenants
- Cangrejeros de Santurce; Puerto Rico national basketball team (1973–present)

Roberto Clemente Coliseum (Spanish: Coliseo Roberto Clemente) is a sports and concert indoor arena in Puerto Rico since opening in 1973. Located in the Hato Rey business center of San Juan, the capital city and municipality of the archipelago and island, the venue is named after legendary baseball player Roberto Clemente. It has a maximum capacity of 12,500, making it the second-largest indoor arena in Puerto Rico and the insular Caribbean, after the nearby José Miguel Agrelot Coliseum.

== General information ==
The Coliseum is named after baseball hall of famer Roberto Clemente, who died in a plane crash off Isla Verde International Airport in Carolina in 1972, while flying with relief articles to be given to victims of the Nicaragua earthquake. Construction of the facility began in the late 1960s, it was finished in January 1973, and inaugurated in February of that year by the Fania All-Stars.

The coliseum has been host to a variety of events, including world championship boxing and basketball, business expos, circus, concerts and other things.

Many Puerto Rican and international performers have been at the arena, among others.

Concerts that have been held there include:

- Saga/FM: Silent Knight/City Of Fear Tour
  - January 10, 1981 (The photo that appears on the Worlds Apart Album was shot there)
- Santana: Zebop! Tour - April 18, 1981 and April 19, 1981
- Judas Priest: Point Of Entry Tour - December 15, 1981
- Quiet Riot: Metal Health Tour - December 3, 1983
- Chicago - August 17, 1984
- José José - May 10, 1985
- Bon Jovi/Ratt: The World Infestation Tour '85 - December 13, 1985
- W.A.S.P./Kiss: Asylum Tour - January 12, 1986
- John Butcher Axis/Night Ranger: Seven Wishes Tour - February 8, 1986
- Hall & Oates - May 16, 1986
- Loverboy/Dokken: Under Lock And Key Tour - July 26, 1986
- Rough Cutt/Dio: Sacred Heart Tour - October 11, 1986
- Cyndi Lauper: True Colors Tour - January 3, 1987
- 38 Special/Kansas: Drastic Measures Tour - January 31, 1987
- Duran Duran: Strange Behavior Tour - August 7/8, 1987
- Def Leppard: Hysteria Tour - January 19, 1988
- Triumph: A Sport Of Kings Tour - March 25, 1988
- Saga - April 22, 1988
- R.E.O. Speedwagon/Information Society - January 7, 1989
- Jetboy/Stryper: Against The Law Tour - October 20, 1990
- Meat Loaf/Extreme: Pornograffitti Tour - January 31, 1992
- Chicago - February 29, 1992
- Gloria Estefan: Into The Light World Tour - March 14–15, 1992
- Sting: Ten Summoner's Tales Tour - March 9, 1993
- INXS: Full Moon, Dirty Hearts Tour - March 23, 1994
- Gloria Estefan: Evolution World Tour - January 17–18, 1997
- Boston: Livin' For You Tour - September 6, 1997
- El Reencuentro - 1998
- Maná: Sueños Líquidos Tour - April 10, 1998
- Simone: Brazil O Show - August, 1998
- Mötley Crüe: Greatest Hits Tour - December 12, 1998
- Puya/Kiss: Psycho Circus Tour - April 14, 1999
- Alanis Morissette: Junkie Tour - December 18, 1999
- Christina Aguilera: Christina Aguilera in Concert - January 14, 2001
- Sting: Brand New Day Tour - February 3, 2001
- Luis Fonsi: Eterno Tour - February 10/11, 2001
- Laura Pausini: 2001–2002 World Tour - October 21, 2001
- Jennifer Lopez: Let's Get Loud Concert - November 2001
- The Cranberries: Wake Up And Smell The Coffee Tour - June 9, 2002
- Firehouse/R.E.O. Speedwagon/Journey - May 8, 2004
- Boston - August 27, 2004
- Stryper - August 19, 2005
- Judas Priest: Angel Of Retribution - September 16, 2005
- Incubus - December 5, 2005
- Firehouse/Slaughter/Poison:20 Years Of Tour - August 31, 2006
- Metal Church/Queensryche - August 16, 2008
- R.E.O. Speedwagon/Kansas - October 18, 2008
- Puya/Sebastian Bach/Guns N'Roses: Chinese Democracy World Tour - April 15, 2010
- Air Supply: 2012
- Soulfly/Fear Factory: The World Industrialist Tour - August 28, 2012
- Stryper/Tesla/Bret Michaels: Get Your Rocks On Tour - October 6, 2012

Van Halen were scheduled to perform during their III Tour on September 20 and December 11, 1998, but the shows were cancelled.

It has been the home of three different BSN professional basketball teams and the BSN has also used it as a neutral site for their most important games, including game 7 of the championship finals, several times.

The Coliseum has also been used by religious leaders for conferences and religious services.

Most of the world championship boxing bouts fought in Puerto Rico during the late 1970s and early 1980s were fought at the Roberto Clemente coliseum, including Roberto Durán's world title defense versus Mexican Leoncio Ortiz, Wilfredo Gómez's knockout win against Carlos Zarate, many of Samuel Serrano's title defenses, and the fight where Muhammad Ali defended his title against Jean Pierre Coopman, the only time a world Heavyweight championship fight has been held in Puerto Rico. George Foreman had his last fight (and experienced the vision that led him to become a born-again Christian in one of its dressing rooms) before announcing his first retirement there, and Julio César Chávez had one of his first important fights there, on the undercard of Edwin Rosario's world Lightweight championship win against José Luis Ramírez. Because of all the boxing action going on during that era, many observers call the period from the middle 1970s to the middle 1980s as the golden age of boxing in Puerto Rico.

The arena also hosted the final phase of the 1974 World Basketball championship.

The Coliseum has also been the place of large political rallies, and Puerto Rico's electoral commission uses its facilities to count votes after each election, and also hosted Miss Universe 2002, won by Oxana Fedorova of Russia. The Van Halen concert was cancelled due to a hurricane. Some days later the band sent a cargo plane with care packages.

== Events ==
=== Basketball ===
International basketball matches
Date	Competition	Home	Away	Score	Attendance
June 28, 2018	2019 FIBA Basketball World Cup qualification	Puerto Rico	Cuba	84–80	
July 1, 2018	2019 FIBA Basketball World Cup qualification	Puerto Rico	Mexico	84–79	
September 14, 2018	2019 FIBA Basketball World Cup qualification	Puerto Rico	Panama	82–73	8,500
February 22, 2019	2019 FIBA Basketball World Cup qualification	Puerto Rico	Argentina	87–86 (OT)	8,000
February 25, 2019	2019 FIBA Basketball World Cup qualification	Puerto Rico	Uruguay	65–61	9,000
February 20, 2020	2022 FIBA AmeriCup qualification	Puerto Rico	United States	70–83	
February 19, 2021	2022 FIBA AmeriCup qualification	Puerto Rico	Mexico	90–80	
February 20, 2021	2022 FIBA AmeriCup qualification	Puerto Rico	(The Bahamas) Bahamas	102–97	

== See also ==
- List of buildings and structures in Puerto Rico

Preceded by Coliseo Rubén Rodríguez (Puerto Rico) Bayamón	Miss Universe Venue; 2002	Succeeded by Figali Convention Center; Panama City
Preceded by Dvorana Tivoli (Slovenia) Ljubljana	FIBA World Cup; Final Venue; 1974	Succeeded by Araneta Coliseum (Philippines) Quezon City
