= Al Braverman =

American boxing manager, promoter, and trainer (1919–1997)

- Born: Al Braverman; March 22, 1919; Bronx, New York, U.S.
- Died: July 5, 1997 (aged 78); Yonkers, New York, U.S.
- Other name: Big Al
- Occupation: Boxing manager

Al Braverman (March 22, 1919 – July 5, 1997), also known as Big Al, was an American boxing manager, promoter, and trainer.

== Early life and education ==
Al Braverman was born on March 22, 1919, in Bronx, New York, United States. He was the son of Rose and Lou Braverman. His father owned a pawnshop at 54th Street and Eighth Avenue. Al grew up in the Bronx and graduated from Roosevelt High School in 1937.

When he was 17, he'd casually hang around Lou Stillman's gym, aspiring to become a prize fighter.

== Career ==
Al Braverman, active in boxing since the 1930s, enjoyed an unbeaten heavyweight run from 1938 to 1941. He competed in Newark's Laurel Garden and New York's St. Nicholas Arena. Managed by American boxing trainer Ray Arcel, Braverman was undefeated in a string of professional boxing matches before World War II interrupted his fighting career.

Stationed in Ghana as a master sergeant, he organized military boxing events across Africa and wrote a boxing column for the Army's newspaper, Stars and Stripes. A leg injury sustained during deployment prevented his return to the ring in 1945, shifting his focus to training and managing fighters. His early mentor, Ray Arcel, said, "Al was a pretty good heavyweight. I handled him for 12 pro fights that he won, and he developed a very good left jab. Then he left for the Navy, and when he came back, he was just interested in developing fighters."

Among the 30 boxers Braverman managed, five fought for world titles, including Bill Bossio, Carlos Ortiz, Jimmy Dupree, Frankie DePaula, and Chuck Wepner.

Alongside boxing, he promoted wrestling matches throughout the Northeast with partners Willie Gilzenberg, Paddy Flood, and Vincent J. McMahon (father of Vince McMahon).

By 1954, he served as president of the newly established boxing organization, the Metropolitan Boxing Alliance (MBA). That October, Braverman and over 45 Alliance representatives accused the Carbo-controlled International Boxing Guild of blacklisting their fighters from St. Nicholas Arena and Madison Square Garden, addressing their grievances to the New York State Athletic Commission. He claimed Madison Square Garden matchmakers Billy Brown and Jack Barrett told him to join another Guild to get his fighters work. On November 19, 1954, his boxing license was suspended in New York by the commission following his sworn testimony about his role in booking fighters, particularly preliminary boxers, for out-of-town managers. The commission promptly implemented a rule to stop unlicensed "booking" of fighters, mandating that managers and promoters disclose all negotiations. His suspension was lifted on November 30, 1954.

He was approached by boxing promoter Don King to be the director of boxing for his promotion company in 1975. Negotiating contracts for King's fights, he stayed with Don King Promotions' New York office for his final 22 years. In 1975, the Al Braverman-managed Chuck Wepner, also called "The Bayonne Bleeder," fought for the world heavyweight title in Muhammad Ali vs. Chuck Wepner. In a surprising turn of events, Wepner managed to knock Ali down in the ninth round. After the knockdown, Wepner confidently returned to his corner, telling Braverman, "Get in the car... we're going to the bank... we're rich." However, upon seeing Ali rise from the canvas, Braverman, urgently shouted, "You'd better turn around 'cause he just got up and he's pissed!" Despite Wepner's moment of glory, Ali went on to dominate the remaining rounds, and Wepner ultimately fell just short of going the full 15 rounds. Braverman's fighter, Wepner, notably became the inspiration for the creation of Rocky by Sylvester Stallone in 1976. Acting as Wepner's cornerman that night, Braverman applied salve to his face to keep him from bleeding. When the State Athletic Commission raised concerns, claiming it was a foreign substance, he countered, "It ain't a foreign substance—it's made right here in the United States." He would claim that Jack Kearns had given him an ancient Indian remedy to prevent cuts. In reality, he had learned about treating cuts through his experiences at the fights and observing how Ray Arcel took care of fighters in the gym, with Arcel admitting to the use of Monsel's Solution before its ban.

Collaborating with Don King, he helped shape the United States Boxing Championships Series, set for 1977. ABC paid $2 million to King and $200,000 in matchmaking fees to Braverman and Paddy Flood. It was later revealed in an investigation that half the participating fighters had ties to King, Braverman, Flood, Johnny Ort, or Chris Cline.

Al, managing heavyweight boxer Dino Denis, secured him a 1979 bout against Gerry Cooney at Madison Square Garden, which could have led to a title fight with John Tate or Larry Holmes if Denis won. Braverman refused to let Denis attend a press conference at the Garden after promoter-matchmaker Gil Clancy slighted him during the Wilfredo Gómez-Nick Perez super-bantamweight title fight.

In the early 1980s, he co-managed Mustafa Hamsho with the outspoken Irishman Paddy Flood. He guided the fighter to a 30-1-1 record and a win against Curtis Parker for a shot at Marvelous Marvin Hagler's middleweight titles in 1981. By 1983, Braverman had been in the corner for four fighters who faced Hagler.

Braverman trained Eddie Mustafa Muhammad for his 1981 world title match against undefeated Michael Spinks in Las Vegas.

== Family ==
On May 23, 1942, he married Renee Lepkoffker and initially settled in the Bronx before eventually moving to Yonkers. The couple raised two children, Gary and Cory Braverman.

Alongside his wife, Renee, Braverman managed an antique shop. As business partners, they ran Ragtime Corp. Antiques on Park Place in Bronxville, New York, and had also owned the Braverman Gallery in Manhattan during the early 1960s.

== Death ==
Braverman died at 78 years old on July 5, 1997, in Yonkers, New York, United States. His death was caused by complications of diabetes.

== Legacy ==
American boxing expert Bert Sugar said, "He was one of the characters that boxing has made its name on."

Ron Perlman portrayed him in the 2016 biographical film Chuck, and Joe Pantoliano took on the role in The Brawler, released in 2019.
