= Operation Bullpen =

FBI fraud investigation

Operation Bullpen was an FBI investigation into forged celebrity autographs and sports memorabilia that ran from 1999 until 2006. The investigation uncovered $100 million worth of fraud (equivalent to $160,000,000 in 2025) that occurred in the United States.

== Background ==
In the 1990s, Operation Foulball in San Diego began uncovering widespread forgeries of baseball memorabilia.

After the FBI became aware that a large forgery ring was operating, they launched a joint investigation with the Internal Revenue Service (IRS).

Wayne Bray, a memorabilia shop owner, met master forger Gregory Marino in 1994. The two became friends, and went into business selling forged Mickey Mantle autographs among other items. A large number of the forgeries were made by Marino, who could perfectly copy signatures on sight and worked 15 hours a day to produce forgeries. Marino estimated that he made over one million forgeries during their operation. They went into business with former deputy sheriff, Stan Fitzgerald, a well known distributor of memorabilia on the East Coast. Over time, their forgery ring grew to include 20 individuals including several members of Marino's family. Marino's father produced lithograph paintings of athletes, which sold for much higher sums once Gregory Marino had added forged signatures to them. Another notable figure was John Olson, who forged around 10,000 autographs, the majority of which were Muhammad Ali.

The forgers used a variety of methods to make their memorabilia appear authentic, including buying old books to use the aged paper inside for autographs, aging baseballs in shellac, storing memorabilia in bags of dog food to make them smell old, and using antique ink and pens to sign them. They made their businesses appear more legitimate by taking out ads on home shopping networks and in official trade publications.

== Phase 1 ==
The FBI began a national investigation into forgeries of sports memorabilia in October 1999. In April 2000, the FBI made an announcement about the operation, with investigators estimating that anywhere from 50% to 90% of memorabilia in the industry was fake. The FBI began an undercover operation through an agent posing as a forgery distributor in Asia. This undercover distributor operated through a fake company called the Nihon Trading Company.

In addition to tracking down forgers and distributors, the FBI also targeted authenticators who knowingly authenticated forged memorabilia for the ring. Most memorabilia at the time was authenticated by Donald Frangipani, an FBI authentication expert. Frangipani was later used as an expert witness in the trials, despite having personally worked with the defendants.

During the investigation, it was discovered that forged memorabilia was being sold through trade publications, shopping channels and even retail stores. In one official team store, an estimated 75 percent of autographs purported to be from MLB players and other personnel were fake. Among these forgeries were supposed autographs by Mickey Mantle, a Babe Ruth underwear box, as well as a baseball with a forged signature from the Catholic saint Mother Teresa.

On October 13, 1999, the FBI conducted a massive raid across five states. It was the biggest single-day takedown in FBI history, resulting in the confiscation of around $10 million in forged memorabilia, and $500,000 in cash. The forged items included "cut" autographs with the forged signatures of individuals like deceased US presidents Abraham Lincoln, George Washington, Theodore Roosevelt and John F. Kennedy.

In 2000, five members of the Marino family and 20 other individuals pled guilty to charges related to the forgery ring. Gregory Marino was sentenced to almost three and a half years in prison.

== Phase 2 ==
Phase 2 of Operation Bullpen began in 2002 and included forgeries which were sold online. During this phase, the FBI conducted 18 searches in 12 states.

== Phase 3 ==
The FBI defaced forged signatures on the equipment and memorabilia they confiscated during the investigation, and donated them to children's organizations and other groups.

The operation was finally ended in 2005, after shutting down 18 forgery rings and confiscating $15 million worth of fake memorabilia. Ultimately, over 60 convictions were made due to the investigation.

== Legacy ==
After the results of the investigation came to light, Major League Baseball launched the MLB Authentication Program to ensure the integrity of official memorabilia and to preserve historical records. Other leagues such as the National Football League, National Hockey League and National Basketball Association launched smaller scale efforts at identifying fakes.

In 2017, Gregory Marino was interviewed for The Counterfeiter, a part of ESPN's 30 for 30 series of documentary films.
