= Mike Schutte =

Mike or Michael Schutte may refer to:

- Michael Schutte (born 1979), Canadian ice hockey player
- Mike Schutte (boxer) (1950–2008), South African boxer, actor, comedian and singer
