= The Brawler =

- Film poster
- Directed by: Ken Kushner
- Screenplay by: Ken Kushner; Robert Dibella
- Story by: Ken Kushner
- Based on: Muhammad Ali vs. Chuck Wepner: Give the White Guy a Break
- Produced by: Mary Aloe; Arthur L. Bernstein; Randy DeOrio; Adam Falkoff; Daniel Grodnik; Ken Kushner; Jared Safier; Judy San Roman; Rob Simmons; Michael Yackovone
- Starring: Zach McGowan; Amy Smart; Taryn Manning
- Cinematography: Przemyslaw Reut
- Edited by: Rayvin Disla
- Music by: Eros Cartechini
- Production companies: JARS Productions; Aloe Entertainment; Mass Hysteria Entertainment; Massive Film Project; Circle 4 Entertainment; Safier Entertainment
- Distributed by: Vertical Entertainment
- Release date: January 18, 2019
- Running time: 95 minutes
- Country: United States
- Language: English

The Brawler is a 2019 American biographical film directed by Ken Kushner and starring Zach McGowan as Chuck Wepner. The film also stars Amy Smart and Taryn Manning.

== Plot ==
Chuck is a heavyweight boxer ranked in the top ten, struggling to provide for his wife Phyllis and their children. One day he receives news that he will be fighting the champion Muhammad Ali. With the help of his trainer and manager Al Braverman, Chuck trains full-time for the upcoming bout. Prior to a press conference between the two boxers, Ali asks a surprised Chuck to racially berate him to generate press, though Chuck refuses to do so.

The night of the fight, Wepner manages to score a knockdown against Ali, but is ultimately dominated, getting knocked out in the 15th and final round. However, Chuck becomes a local hero, and receives a call that a film is being produced based on his fight with Ali, which eventually winning the Academy Award for Best Picture. Chuck allows the fame to get to his head and begins systematically partying, cheating on his wife and doing cocaine. Phyllis eventually finds out and, after a bitter argument, leaves him.

After engaging in a mixed wrestling/boxing match with Andre the Giant, a down-on-his-luck Wepner meets a woman named Linda in a bar. Wepner is also given the chance by Sylvester Stallone to audition for a role in Rocky II, though following a confrontation with the producer, his part gets cut. He subsequently has a falling out with his brother Donnie.

After taking an unsanctioned bout with Victor, a wrestling bear, Wepner is arrested and imprisoned for a botched drug deal. During his incarceration he meets Stallone in prison, who is filming his upcoming movie Lock Up. Two years later Wepner is released from prison, and later marries Linda.

By 1993, Chuck continues his previous work as a liquor salesman, abstaining from drugs, also reconciles with Donnie. Wepner is subsequently approached by John Olson to sign memorabilia at his shop. Though suspicious, he agrees to do signings for Olson, but is later arrested for involvement in a sports memorabilia fraud that Olson had headed. However, no serious charges are made against Wepner, and he is released. He later meets Stallone a third time during Stallone's filming of Cop Land. Chuck is increasingly irritated for what little compensation he was given for the Rocky film and successfully sues Stallone, finally allowing Chuck to settle down into a comfortable life.

== Cast ==
- Zach McGowan as Chuck Wepner
- Amy Smart as Linda Wepner
- Taryn Manning as Phyllis Wepner
- Joe Pantoliano as Al Braverman
- Burt Young as Salvatore
- Jason James Richter as John Olson
- Nick Loeb as Donnie Wepner
- Cree Kelly as Flo Wepner
- Helene Wren as Charlene Wepner
- Jay Willick as Howard Cosell
- Anthony Mangano as Sylvester Stallone
- Robert Clohessy as Anthony Mango
- Jerrod Page as Muhammad Ali
- Betsy Beutler as Donna
- Kenisha Green as Khalilah Ali
- William Lee Scott as Artie Stock
- Anthony Asse as Don King
- Christopher Picone as Angelo Dundee
- Anthony Aveni as Bobby Vincent
- Joe Gawalis as Arthur Chobanian
- Alan Bendich as Mike Douglas
- James Dijan Bonavia as André the Giant
- Laith Nakli as Martin

== Reception ==
On Metacritic, the film has a score of 46 out of 100 based on four critics, indicating "mixed or average reviews".

== See also ==
- Chuck, another biographical film about Wepner
- List of boxing films
