= You Must Be Joking =

You Must Be Joking! may refer to:

- You Must Be Joking! (1965 film), a British comedy film
- You Must Be Joking! (1986 film), a South African comedy film
- You Must Be Joking! (2014 film), an American comedy film
- You Must Be Joking! (TV series), a 1970s UK comedy programme starring Ray Burdis
