= John Tate vs. Gerrie Coetzee =

- Date: October 20, 1979
- Venue: Loftus Versfeld Stadium, Pretoria, South Africa
- Title(s) on the line: vacant WBA heavyweight title

Tale of the tape
Boxer	John Tate	Gerrie Coetzee
Nickname	Big	The Boksburg Bomber
Hometown	Knoxville, Tennessee, U.S.	Boksburg, South Africa
Purse	$400,000	$300,000
Pre-fight record	19–0– (16 KO)	22–0 (12 KO)
Age	24 years, 8 months	24 years, 6 months
Height	6 ft 4 in (193 cm)	6 ft 3 1/2 in (192 cm)
Weight	240 lb (109 kg)	222 lb (101 kg)
Style	Orthodox	Orthodox
Recognition	WBA; No. 1 Ranked Heavyweight	WBA; No. 2 Ranked Heavyweight

Result
- Tate wins via 15-round unanimous decision (148–145, 147–144, 147–142)

John Tate vs. Gerrie Coetzee was a professional match contested on October 20, 1979, for the vacant WBA heavyweight title.

== Background ==
After regaining the WBA heavyweight title from Leon Spinks in September 1978, Muhammad Ali mulled retirement, explaining he would hold on to the title for six months before announcing whether he would continue fighting or retire. Ali had seemingly decided to continue his career as his promoter Bob Arum had entered into negotiations with newly crowned WBA light heavyweight champion, who had upset long-reigning champion Víctor Galíndez on the Spink–Ali II undercard. However, though Ali was offered a $12 million payday to either take the Rossman fight or face Duane Bobick instead, he ultimately passed on both fights, citing the sizable weight difference between him and Rossman and the perceived difference in class between him and Bobick stating he did not want to be criticized for fighting "a light heavyweight champion" or "a bum just for the money."

After months of deliberation, Ali would officially announce his retirement in late June 1979, vacating the WBA heavyweight title in the process. Just weeks after Ali's retirement, Arum would announce that the WBA's two top-ranked heavyweight contenders, John Tate and Gerrie, would face each other for the vacant WBA heavyweight title in Coetzee's native South Africa on October 20, at the Loftus Versfeld Stadium. Arum would admit to paying a still-undecided Ali $300,000 in order to persuade him to retire so Arum could officially announce the Tate–Coetzee fight.

Arum, anticipating Ali's retirement had already organized a four-man, two-night tournament between four heavyweight contenders before Ali's retirement announcement. The first fight, held on June 2, between Tate and South African Kallie Knoetze, ended with Tate knocking out the Knoetze, the then-number-one ranked heavyweight in the eighth round, propelling Tate to becoming ranked as the number-one heavyweight. Coetzee would win the second fight on June 24, knocking out Spinks, the former undisputed heavyweight champion, in the first round. Arum opted to hold the fight in South Africa after promising South African business magnate Sol Kerzner, who helped Arum organize the Tate–Knoetze fight in Bophuthatswana earlier in the year, that he would do so if either of the South African contenders; Coetzee or Knoetze, won their respective fights against Spinks and Tate.

The decision to hold the fight in South Africa was controversial due to the apartheid laws the country had in place at the time, which segregated white and black South Africans. A group of anti-apartheid demonstrators, including Jesse Jackson organized a "stop the fight" campaign, protesting Arum's decision to hold the fight in South Africa and NBC for agreeing to air the bout on its network. Arum defended his decision, stating that he had "firm assurances" from South African Minister of Sport, Punt Jansen, that for the first time in its history, the Loftus Versfeld Stadium would be fully integrated, as would all future boxing matches held in the country.

The bout drew an audience of 81,000 which produced a gate of $3.36 million, making it one of the highest attended, behind only "The Long Count Fight" between Gene Tunney and Jack Dempsey, and most profitable boxing events at the time.

== Fight details ==
Tate would earn the victory via a 15-round unanimous decision, being named the winner by all three judges with scores of 148–145, 147–144 and 147–142.

The fight started slowly as, both fighters fought cautiously in the first several rounds, neither landing any substantial offense until the final seconds of the third round when Coetzee staggered Tate with a one-two combination, forcing Tate to clinch to survive the round. Coetzee would stagger Tate again early in the following round with a left hook, nearly scoring a knockdown as an off-balance Tate nearly touched the canvas with his left glove. Tate would regain his composure after those close calls and outboxed Coetzee, especially during the later rounds to earn the victory.

== Fight card ==
Confirmed bouts:

Weight class	Weight		vs.		Method	Round	Notes
Heavyweight	200+ lbs.	John Tate	def.	Gerrie Coetzee	UD	15	^{note 1}
Welterweight	147 lbs.	Harold Volbrecht (c)	def.	David Kambule	PTS	12	^{note 2}
Light Middleweight	154 lbs.	Rubén Pardo	def.	Gert Steyn	TKO	5/10
Heavyweight	200+ lbs.	Kallie Knoetze	def.	Randy Stephens	KO	3/10
Heavyweight	200+ lbs.	Jimmy Abbott	def.	Walter Santemore	TKO	6/10
Light Heavyweight	175 lbs.	Theunis Kok	def.	Mervin Smit	KO	1/8
Heavyweight	200+ lbs.	Dwain Bonds	def.	Robbie Williams	PTS	6
Featherweight	126 lbs.	Bashew Sibaca	def.	Jey Nardo	PTS	6

^Note 1 For vacant WBA Heavyweight title
^Note 2 For South African Welterweight title

== Broadcasting ==
Country	Broadcaster
United States	NBC

Preceded by vs. Kallie Knoetze	John Tate's bouts October 20, 1979	Succeeded by vs. Mike Weaver
Preceded by vs. Leon Spinks	Gerrie Coetzee's bouts October 20, 1979	Succeeded by vs. Mike Koranicki
