= Gerrie Coetzee =

South African professional boxer (1955–2023)

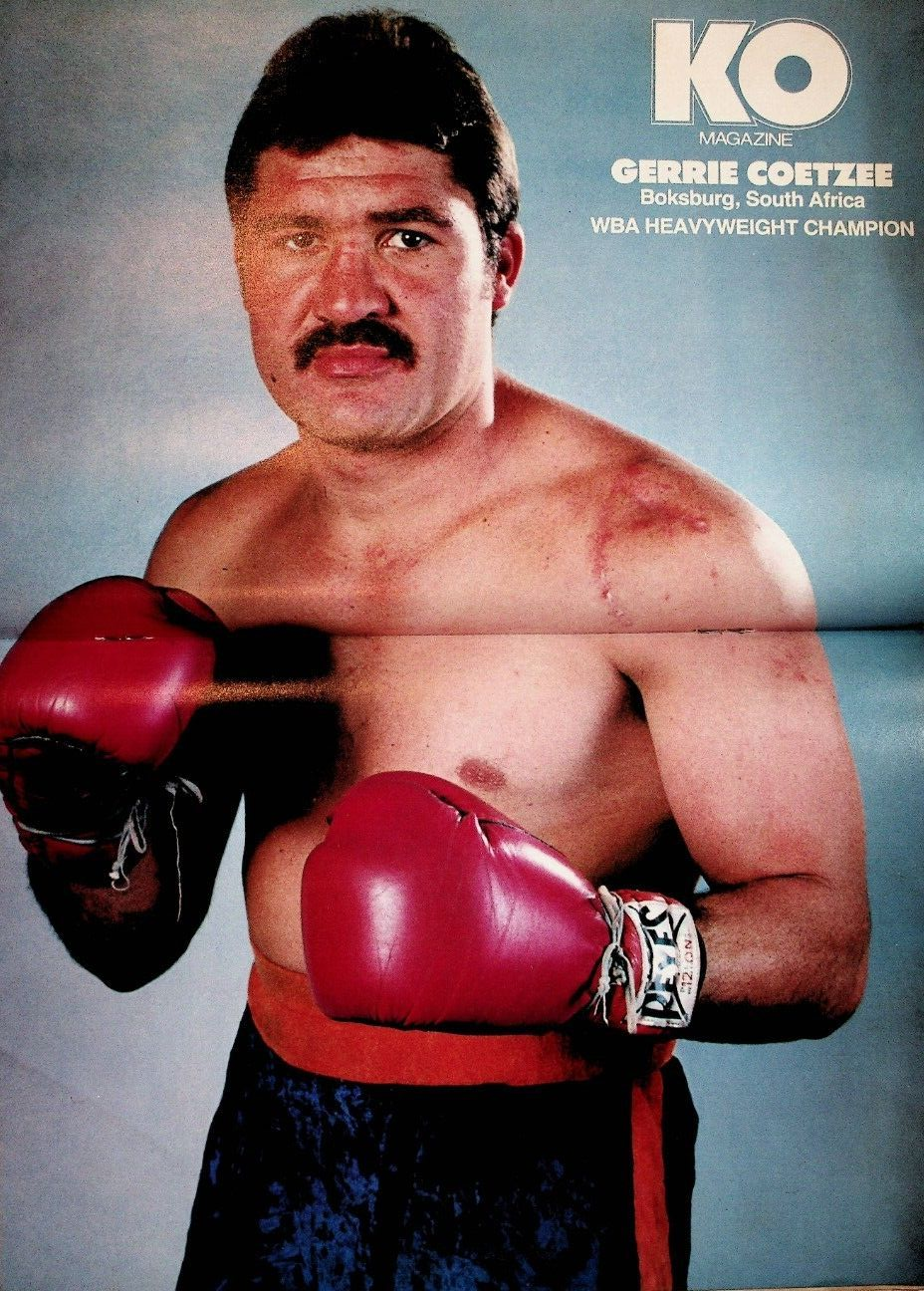
- Coetzee c. 1984

Personal information
- Nicknames: The Boksburg Bomber; The Bionic Hand; Seer Handjies ("Sore Little Hands")
- Born: Gerhardus Christian Coetzee; 8 April 1955 Boksburg, East Rand, Gauteng, South Africa
- Died: 12 January 2023 (aged 67)
- Height: 1.92 m (6 ft 4 in)
- Weight: Heavyweight

Boxing career
- Reach: 206 cm (81 in)
- Stance: Orthodox

Boxing record
- Total fights: 40
- Wins: 33
- Win by KO: 21
- Losses: 6
- Draws: 1

Gerhardus Christian Coetzee OIB (8 April 1955 – 12 January 2023) was a South African professional boxer who competed from 1974 to 1986, and in 1993 and 1997. He was the first African in history to ever fight for, and win, a world heavyweight championship, having held the WBA title from 1983 to 1984. He held notable knockout wins against WBA world heavyweight champion Michael Dokes and former undisputed world heavyweight champion Leon Spinks, as well as a draw with future WBC world heavyweight champion Pinklon Thomas and wins over top contenders Ron Stander, Scott LeDoux and James Tillis.

One of Coetzee's nicknames, "The Bionic Hand", came about because of persistent troubles with his right hand, which required the insertion of several corrective items during three surgeries. His Afrikaans nickname was "Seer Handjies", or "Sore Little Hands", named so by fellow South African boxing great Kallie Knoetze.

Coetzee died of lung cancer on 12 January 2023, at the age of 67.

== Professional career ==
=== Rise to championship contention ===
Coetzee started boxing professionally on the night of 14 September 1974, when he beat 19 fight veteran and fellow South African Christian Roos by a decision in four. Coetzee followed his early success with a string of victories in his homeland. Among those wins was one over Roos in a rematch, which Coetzee won by a knockout in three rounds; he also defeated South African Mike Schutte who had been casually considered as a potential gimmick opponent for Muhammad Ali. Coetzee's other notable wins included defeating former world title challengers Ron Stander, Randy Stephens, and Pierre Fourie; a South African Heavyweight championship victory against amateur rival Kallie Knoetze (unanimous decision in 10) as well as a first-round knockout of former world heavyweight champion Leon Spinks. With exception of the Spinks bout, held at Monte Carlo, the majority of Coetzee's fights during his early run were held in his native South Africa.

In the fight with Spinks, the former champion attacked Coetzee and pressured him, throwing punches from many angles and trying to steam-roll the South African. Coetzee composed himself and, with a short right hand delivered to Spinks' temple, knocked down the former world champion. Coetzee proceeded to drop Spinks two more times to record a first round technical knockout. The win enhanced Coetzee's reputation as a real title threat in the post-Ali landscape of the heavyweight division.

=== First world title attempt ===
Coetzee as the #2 contender was matched with John Tate for the WBA heavyweight title that had been left vacant by Muhammad Ali’s retirement. The bout was held in Pretoria and in fact this event was the first time blacks were allowed into the venue (Loftus Versfeld).

Coetzee was the first African-born heavyweight ever to challenge for a world title. The Boksburg Bomber fought a tentative bout and, after holding his own early, faded from the midpoint of the bout onward. Tate won a decision over 15 rounds. Coetzee would reveal later in his career that in his early fighting years, he struggled with self-confidence, particularly in measuring up to American fighters.

Coetzee himself was vocal in his opposition to apartheid. To provide context: The first major boxing event in South Africa to change the face of sports in apartheid South Africa was the fight between Bob Foster and Pierre Fourie on 1 December 1973. This laid firm foundations for racially mixed boxing in front of racially mixed audiences. Mixed bouts between South Africans were legalised in 1977, but the last vestiges of the colour bar disappeared only two years later when the system of white, black and supreme titles was abolished.

The first multiracial South African title fights were held at the Rand Stadium in Johannesburg on 27 November 1976 when Coetzee defeated the top black challenger James Mathatho with a seventh-round knockout in a heavyweight bout for the SA championship. On the same card, Elijah 'Tap Tap' Makhatini beat white contender Jan Kies to become the undisputed South African middleweight champion.

=== Second world title attempt ===
Tate lasted only a short time as WBA world titlist, as he was KO'd in spectacular last-round fashion by Mike Weaver in his first title defense. In the meantime, Coetzee had maintained his status as a highly rated contender by bombing out Mike Koraniki in the first round to keep his title hopes alive.

The new title holder Weaver traveled to South Africa in 1980 to defend his title against Coetzee, fighting in front of a very large crowd. Coetzee dominated the early portions, and had Weaver hurt several times. In the 8th, Weaver was in serious trouble but Coetzee could not capitalize.

With the opportunity to finish Weaver gone, Coetzee seemed to wilt. Weaver was beginning to time Coetzee's punches for counters. By round 12 the fight was close to even, with the South African's lead having evaporated. Weaver had survived Coetzee's onslaught and the tide had turned. Coetzee's stamina failed him and he had begun to throw fewer punches after round 9. Coetzee was now leaning and mauling more and was getting hit more often coming in with his unprotected head held high. Weaver was accelerating and was getting the better of exchanges as the bout wore on. Coetzee was knocked down for the first time in his career and failed to beat the count having been floored by a big counter punch in the 13th round. Coetzee lost the bout by a TKO.

=== Road to a third title bout ===
Less than 5 months after the loss against Weaver, Coetzee returned to the ring and beat fringe contender George Chaplin before facing Renaldo Snipes. Coetzee dropped Snipes twice early and seemed to dominate the action. However, the fight was scored by rounds and not on points, meaning a round won widely with knockdowns was no more valued than a round lost narrowly, and he lost a ten-round decision that was deemed one of the worst of the decade.

Coetzee had gone 5–1 in the 6 fights since the Weaver bout. Among the wins was one over former title challenger Scott Le Doux heading into a bout with the up-and-coming future WBC champion Pinklon Thomas. Again, Coetzee held the edge in the first half of the bout but Thomas rallied to hold Coetzee to a draw, although the result did work against either fighter. Following his loss to Snipes and draw with Thomas, Coetzee was not considered a strong title contender, but he was still highly ranked.

=== WBA heavyweight champion ===
Perhaps because of his success against Thomas in the first half of their fight, Coetzee received his third world title try against WBA champion Michael Dokes. By now known as someone who could not win "The Big One", Coetzee's predicted fate in this bout was to show-case the Don King-promoted Dokes' abilities and status as a rising star.

The fight took place on 23 September 1983 at the Richfield Coliseum in Richfield, Ohio. Coetzee dominated Dokes after a few rounds of even fighting. The South African led with aggression but also used counter punching as well. Coetzee's poise was apparent, and he boxed more deftly than usual employing more left hooks rather than merely swinging his potent right hand. He continued to eschew much in the way of defense, sponging anything Dokes could land. In the 5th, he scored a knockdown and the commentary on the fight revolved around his poise and control.. much different than a man lacking on confidence. After seizing control and dominating, Coetzee knocked out Dokes in the tenth round to become South Africa's first world Heavyweight title holder. He also became the first Caucasian and the first non American world heavyweight champion in 23 years, since Ingemar Johansson defeated Floyd Patterson. The fight was KO Magazine's "Upset of The Year" for 1983.

It turned out that the punch that knocked out Dokes hurt Coetzee even more: his right hand was broken and required surgery five days after the fight, in New York City.

=== Failed unification and defeat ===
There was much talk about a unification bout with the recognized best fighter in the division and now International Boxing Federation Champion, Larry Holmes, in 1984, and a contract for a lucrative bout was signed. Holmes possessed only one of the 3 title belts but was recognized by most as the real, bona fide, champion.

Financial problems arose when the backer of the bout, JPD Sports out of Dallas, Texas, could not raise the original purse necessary. Caesars Palace in Las Vegas spoke of saving the promotion, but it fell through. Don King's involvement as Coetzee's promoter, as well as Larry Holmes' previous split with King also contributed to the bout not coming to fruition. Holmes wanted to save the bout which would have earned both him and Coetzee a significant sum of money. Coetzee was personally willing and eager for the bout. He even indicated he was willing to go through with the bout though he would likely enter the ring without the WBA title. The WBA had stated that for the bout to take place with its blessing, it required Holmes to fight as a contender for Coetzee's belt. Or, the WBA would require Coetzee to drop his belt to qualify as a challenger for Holmes.

Holmes saw no reason for the WBA to preside over a bout between the two men. The WBA insisted Coetzee could not face Holmes, despite the fact Holmes had been recognized as the best heavyweight in the world since 1978. In any event, Coetzee re-injured his hand during training camp, requiring further surgery, and the fight was cancelled.

On his return to the ring, after an extended absence, Coetzee was paired with Greg Page. The original #1 contender, David Bey, refused to visit South Africa after outpointing Greg Page over 12 rounds. "Only in America: The Life and Crimes of Don King" by Jack Newfield mentions this. Page's inability to win larger fights had damaged his reputation. He was seen as talented and, like many fighters in the immediate post-Ali era, his size, speed, and coordination led to high audience expectations. While Page could look extremely impressive, as against James Tillis for example, he was also seen as lazy and unmotivated.

In this bout Page did less posing than normal, and did more fighting putting on an energetic performance. Coetzee seemed overconfident, and can be seen delivering a lot of the trash-talking and doing less punching and trying more verbal intimidation such as he used in bouts against Tate and Weaver. But Page was in much better form than when he had lost to Bey. Coetzee for his part was dangerous and while sloppy, was sending his own shots home. The challenger's strong chin nullified Coetzee's power to some extent. The two exchanged momentum. Coetzee's lack of defense was more evident than usual, and he was a sitting duck for Page's counter-punching and his once dependable chin seemed to fail him, being stung and hurt often. His right was not effective, but he was scoring with his left hand. He was dropped after the bell of the 6th round in a foul; and in the 7th legitimately. Page was taking advantage of Coetzee's recklessness. In exchange after exchange as the bout wore on, it was Coetzee, the "puncher", losing the skirmishes and being hurt. He was knocked out in Round 8. But, there was controversy.

Coetzee's camp protested that not only had the 8th round run too long, but also that while Coetzee was on the canvas the bell had sounded and the referee's count should have been waved off. Generally, this would have allowed Coetzee to continue for at least one more round. The 8th, the round in question actually did run for almost a minute too long. Despite this, the WBA recognized the result as it happened, and affirmed Page as the winner by a knockout in eight. Coetzee and his camp demanded an immediate rematch. Instead, Page went on to face Tony Tubbs whom he had beaten several times in the amateurs.

=== Post-championship career ===
After losing his title, Coetzee made token attempts at a comeback. He beat the former title challenger and at that time mid-level foe James "Quick" Tillis by a decision in ten. Next was a journey to England to fight the big-punching contender Frank Bruno. In the offing would be a shot at the WBA title, since won by Tim Witherspoon (who had defeated Tubbs, who had defeated Page). Coetzee was knocked out in round one. After that fight, he announced his retirement, but came back twice during the 1990s, winning by knockout in three against both Dave Fiddler and West Turner in 1993, and then winning against Dan Komiscki in three. Finally in 1997, Coetzee lost to former world Middleweight and Light Heavyweight champion Iran Barkley by a knockout in ten, after dropping him in round two, for the WBB Superheavyweight belt.

== Professional boxing record ==
40 fights	33 wins	6 losses
By knockout	21	4
By decision	11	2
By disqualification	1	0
Draws	1	

No.	Result	Record	Opponent	Type	Round, time	Date	Location	Notes
40	Loss	33–6–1	Iran Barkley	TKO	10 (12), 2:07	8 Jun 1997	Hollywood Palladium, Los Angeles, California, US	For vacant World Boxing Board heavyweight title
39	Win	33–5–1	Dan Kosmicki	TKO	3 (10)	10 Jan 1997	Hollywood Palladium, Los Angeles, California, US	
38	Win	32–5–1	West Turner	TKO	5 (10)	1 Oct 1993	ARCO Arena, Sacramento, California, US	
37	Win	31–5–1	Dave Fiddler	KO	2 (10), 0:58	27 Aug 1993	ARCO Arena, Sacramento, California, US	
36	Loss	30–5–1	Frank Bruno	KO	1 (10), 1:50	4 Mar 1986	Wembley Arena, London, England	
35	Win	30–4–1	James Tillis	UD	10	7 Sep 1985	Ellis Park Stadium, Johannesburg, South Africa	
34	Loss	29–4–1	Greg Page	KO	8 (15), 3:03	1 Dec 1984	Superbowl, Sun City, Bophuthatswana	Lost WBA heavyweight title
33	Win	29–3–1	Michael Dokes	KO	10 (15), 3:08	23 Sep 1983	Coliseum, Richfield, Ohio, US	Won WBA heavyweight title
32	Draw	28–3–1	Pinklon Thomas	MD	10	22 Jan 1983	Sands, Atlantic City, New Jersey, US	
31	Win	28–3	Stan Ward	TKO	2 (10), 2:10	11 Sep 1982	Sands, Atlantic City, New Jersey, US	
30	Win	27–3	Scott LeDoux	KO	8 (10)	27 Mar 1982	Rand Stadium, Johannesburg, South Africa	
29	Win	26–3	Fossie Schmidt	RTD	4 (10)	13 Feb 1982	Rand Stadium, Johannesburg, South Africa	
28	Win	25–3	Leroy Caldwell	KO	5 (10), 2:37	31 Oct 1981	Ellis Park Stadium, Johannesburg, South Africa	
27	Loss	24–3	Renaldo Snipes	SD	10	9 Aug 1981	New Westchester Theater, Tarrytown, New York, US	
26	Win	24–2	George Chaplin	UD	10	14 Mar 1981	Aloha Stadium, Honolulu, Hawaii, US	
25	Loss	23–2	Mike Weaver	TKO	13 (15), 1:49	25 Oct 1980	Superbowl, Sun City, Bophuthatswana	For WBA heavyweight title
24	Win	23–1	Mike Koranicki	KO	1 (10), 1:43	19 Apr 1980	Rand Stadium, Johannesburg, South Africa	
23	Loss	22–1	John Tate	UD	15	20 Oct 1979	Loftus Versfeld Stadium, Pretoria, South Africa	For vacant WBA heavyweight title
22	Win	22–0	Leon Spinks	TKO	1 (12), 2:03	24 Jun 1979	Le Chapiteau de l'Espace, Fontvieille, Monaco	
21	Win	21–0	Ibar Arrington	PTS	10	15 Dec 1978	New Kingsmead Soccer Stadium, Durban, South Africa	
20	Win	20–0	Randy Stephens	PTS	10	26 May 1978	Film Trust Arena, Johannesburg, South Africa	
19	Win	19–0	Johnny Boudreaux	KO	6 (10)	3 Dec 1977	Wembley Stadium, Johannesburg, South Africa	
18	Win	18–0	Tom Prater	RTD	4 (10)	29 Oct 1977	Ellis Park Stadium, Johannesburg, South Africa	
17	Win	17–0	Mike Schutte	PTS	12	16 Apr 1977	Wembley Stadium, Johannesburg, South Africa	Retained South African heavyweight title
16	Win	16–0	Pierre Fourie	KO	3 (12)	19 Mar 1977	Wembley Stadium, Johannesburg, South Africa	Retained South African heavyweight title
15	Win	15–0	James Mathatho	KO	7 (12)	27 Nov 1976	Rand Stadium, Johannesburg, South Africa	Retained South African heavyweight title
14	Win	14–0	Kallie Knoetze	PTS	10	30 Oct 1976	Rand Stadium, Johannesburg, South Africa	
13	Win	13–0	Mike Schutte	DQ	6 (12)	16 Aug 1976	Westridge Park Tennis Stadium, Durban, South Africa	Won South African heavyweight title; Schutte disqualified for attempting to kick Coetzee while he was down
12	Win	12–0	Ron Stander	RTD	8 (10)	17 Jul 1976	Film Trust Arena, Johannesburg, South Africa	
11	Win	11–0	Jimmy Richards	TKO	9 (10), 2:35	10 Apr 1976	Portuguese Hall, Johannesburg, South Africa	Won vacant Transvaal (White) heavyweight title
10	Win	10–0	Hartmut Sasse	PTS	8	22 Mar 1976	Ellis Park Stadium, Johannesburg, South Africa	
9	Win	9–0	Jimmy Richards	PTS	6	28 Feb 1976	Wembley Ice Rink, Johannesburg, South Africa	
8	Win	8–0	Chris Roos	TKO	3 (8)	27 Oct 1975	Wembley Ice Rink, Johannesburg, South Africa	
7	Win	7–0	Hennie Thoonen	TKO	3 (6)	27 Jun 1975	Ellis Park Stadium, Johannesburg, South Africa	
6	Win	6–0	Amedeo Laureti	PTS	6	7 Jun 1975	Wembley Ice Rink, Johannesburg, South Africa	
5	Win	5–0	Hennie Thoonen	PTS	6	5 May 1975	Ellis Park Stadium, Johannesburg, South Africa	
4	Win	4–0	Steve Foley	KO	3 (6)	22 Feb 1975	Ellis Park Stadium, Johannesburg, South Africa	
3	Win	3–0	Kosie Oosthuizen	KO	1 (6), 0:38	2 Nov 1974	Gauteng North Badminton Hall, Pretoria, South Africa	
2	Win	2–0	Bert Nikkelen Kuyper	KO	1 (6), 0:25	26 Oct 1974	Rand Stadium, Johannesburg, South Africa	
1	Win	1–0	Chris Roos	PTS	4	14 Sep 1974	Portuguese Hall, Johannesburg, South Africa	

Sporting positions
Regional boxing titles
Vacant Title last held by Mike Schutte	Transvaal (White) heavyweight champion 10 April 1976 – August 1976; Vacated	Vacant Title next held by Jimmy Abbott
Preceded by Mike Schutte	South African heavyweight champion 16 August 1976 – 1983; Vacated	Vacant Title next held by Robbie Williams
World boxing titles
Preceded by Michael Dokes	WBA heavyweight champion 23 September 1983 – 1 December 1984	Succeeded by Greg Page
Awards
Previous: Kirkland Laing; SD10 Roberto Durán	The Ring Upset of the Year; KO10 Michael Dokes; 1983	Next: Gene Hatcher; TKO11 Johnny Bumphus
