= Chuck (film) =

- Theatrical release poster
- Directed by: Philippe Falardeau
- Written by: Jeff Feuerzeig; Jerry Stahl; Michael Cristofer; Liev Schreiber
- Produced by: Michael Tollin; Carl Hampe; Liev Schreiber; Christa Campbell; Lati Grobman
- Starring: Liev Schreiber; Elisabeth Moss; Ron Perlman; Naomi Watts; Jim Gaffigan; Michael Rapaport; Pooch Hall; Morgan Spector; Jason Jones; William Hill; Wass Stevens
- Cinematography: Nicolas Bolduc
- Edited by: Richard Comeau
- Music by: Corey Allen Jackson
- Production companies: Millennium Films; Mandalay Sports Media; Campbell Grobman Films; Jeff Rice Films
- Distributed by: IFC Films
- Release dates: September 2, 2016 (Venice); May 5, 2017 (United States)
- Running time: 98 minutes
- Country: United States
- Language: English
- Box office: $502,518

Chuck (released as The Bleeder in the UK and Ireland) is a 2016 American biographical sports drama film directed by Philippe Falardeau and written by Jeff Feuerzeig, Jerry Stahl, Michael Cristofer and Liev Schreiber, who also stars in the title role. The cast includes Elisabeth Moss, Ron Perlman, Naomi Watts, Jim Gaffigan, Michael Rapaport, Pooch Hall, Morgan Spector, Jason Jones and Catherine Corcoran and the film debut of Sadie Sink. The film depicts the life of heavyweight boxer Chuck Wepner and his 1975 title fight with the heavyweight champion, Muhammad Ali, which inspired Sylvester Stallone's character and screenplay for the 1976 film Rocky.

Principal photography began on October 26, 2015, in Suffern, New York. Chuck received its world premiere at the 2016 Venice Film Festival on September 2, 2016. It was released May 5, 2017, by IFC Films.

== Plot ==
Chuck Wepner, known as the Bayonne Bleeder, is a heavyweight boxer known for his iron chin and reckless behavior. He lives with his second wife Phyllis and daughter Kimberly in New Jersey. By 1974, he is rising up the boxing ranks hopeful for an eventual fight with the champion George Foreman, defeating Terry "The Stormin' Mormon" Hinke in the process. Chuck's trainer and manager Al Braverman receives a call from Don King stating that he will receive a title shot after George presumably beats Muhammed Ali. However, much to Chuck's shock and disappointment, Ali defeats Foreman in The Rumble in the Jungle. After witnessing Chuck flirting with another woman in a coffee shop, Phyllis leaves Chuck.

Al later calls Chuck and says that Don King wants him to fight Ali in a bout framed with emphasis on Ali and Wepner's racial differences, as Chuck is the only white boxer in the top 10 heavyweight rankings. Al takes Chuck to the Grand Hotel in upstate New York to train professionally. However, following the one-sided press conferences with Ali and negative press the fight receives, Chuck feels nervous. Phyllis eventually comes to see Chuck, and she forgives and comforts him.

Although the fight is largely one-sided, Chuck defies predictions of being knocked out in the third round, almost going the full distance against the champion and even knocking him down. Despite the loss, Wepner becomes a local hero. Though he is irritated to hear claims from Ali that Wepner's knockdown of him was due to a foot stomp, Chuck enjoys his newfound celebrity and becomes the basis of Sylvester Stallone's film Rocky. However, Chuck's fame changes him for the worse, and he begins using cocaine. He also becomes infatuated with a bartender named Linda. Phyllis soon learns of his unfaithful behavior and kicks him out of their house.

After engaging in a mixed wrestling/boxing match with Andre the Giant at Shea Stadium, Chuck visits his brother to celebrate the film's success, though he is unimpressed and despondent with the news, much to his disappointment. Instead, he is welcomed by Stallone after meeting him, and Chuck personally assists in the screenplay of Rocky II. However, he botches his audition for a role as Rocky's sparring partner, leaving him devastated.

Three years later, Chuck's drug problem worsens, which at one point sees him attending to Kimberly's parent-teacher conference disheveled and on cocaine. He is arrested and imprisoned for possession of drugs with intent to sell. During his time in prison, he sees Stallone filming for his movie Lock Up. Chuck soon humbles himself and realizes that he was trying too hard to live up to his superstardom as the "real Rocky", when he should be appreciative with who he has in his life.

After being released from prison for good behavior, he is given an unsanctioned charity bout with Victor the Wrestling Bear to make ends meet. He is visited by Linda, and the two become a couple.

End credits reveal that Chuck and Linda still live in Bayonne, New Jersey, and that he and his daughter have reconciled and speak daily.

== Cast ==
- Liev Schreiber as Chuck Wepner, a heavyweight boxer.
  - Angel Kolev as Young Chuck Wepner 18 years old
- Naomi Watts as Linda Wepner, Wepner's third wife.
- Elisabeth Moss as Phyllis Wepner, Wepner's second wife.
- Jim Gaffigan as John Stoehr, Wepner's best friend.
- Michael Rapaport as Don Wepner, Wepner's estranged brother.
  - Boyan Bankov as Young Don Wepner 18 years old
- Pooch Hall as Muhammad Ali, the heavyweight champion whose 1975 fight earned a sudden fame for Wepner.
- Morgan Spector as Sylvester Stallone, the actor-screenwriter who wrote Rocky right after the 1975 fight.
- Ron Perlman as Al Braverman, Wepner's manager and trainer who guided him to the fight with Ali.
- Kelvin Hale as Charlie Polite, Wepner's training partner for the Ali fight.
- Jason Jones as Arty
- William Hill as Paddy Flood
- Wass Stevens as Johnny DiCesare
- Sadie Sink as Kimberly Wepner
  - Meld Ludwig as Young Kimberly Wepner
- Catherine Corcoran as Sandy
- Marissa Rose Gordon as Penelope, Bikini Girl #2

== Production ==
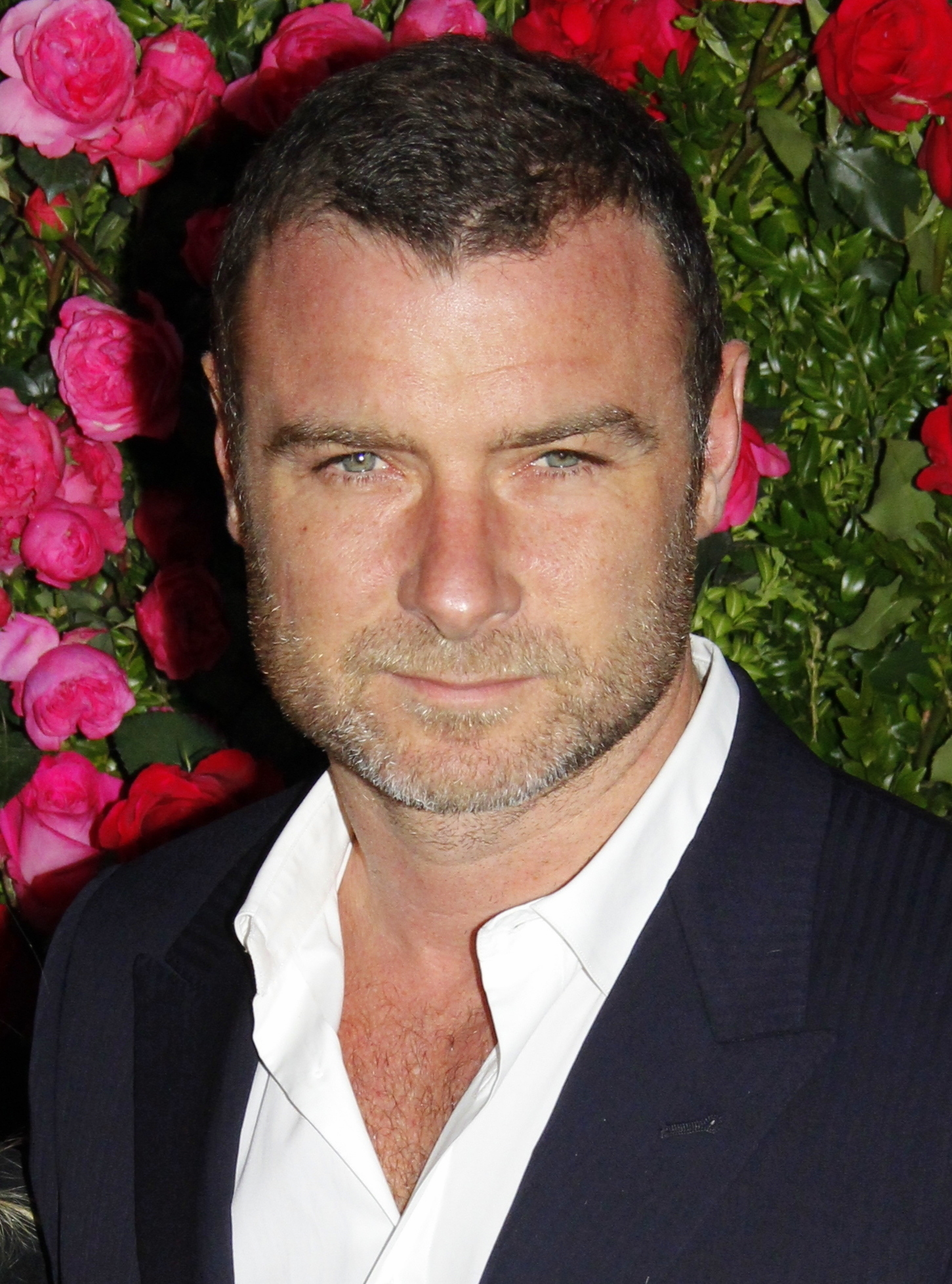
Schreiber, who had been attached with the project for five years, portrays Chuck Wepner.

On May 10, 2011, it was announced that Jeff Feuerzeig would direct the boxing drama The Bleeder based on the script he co-wrote with Jerry Stahl, about a true story of the heavyweight boxer Chuck Wepner. Michael Tollin and Carl Hampe were attached as producers, while Linda Zander's Maxar Pictures was attached to finance the film. Christina Hendricks was previously cast in the film to play one of the lead roles. In October 2015, Liev Schreiber was confirmed to play Wepner, who always wanted to portray the role, and had been attached with the project for the last five years, and Naomi Watts was cast to play his third wife Linda Wepner. Schreiber would also produce the film along with Tollin, Hampe, Christa Campbell, and Lati Grobman, with banners Mandalay Sports Media and Campbell-Grobman Films. On October 22, 2015, Elisabeth Moss was cast in the film to play his second wife, Phyllis Wepner, who was with him when Wepner fought Muhammad Ali.

On October 30, 2015, additional cast was announced, including Jim Gaffigan as John Stoehr, Wepner's loyal friend; Michael Rapaport as Wepner's estranged brother; Pooch Hall as boxer Ali, whose 1975 fight with Wepner led to Wepner's sudden fame; and Morgan Spector as actor-screenwriter Sylvester Stallone, who wrote Rocky soon after the 1975 fight. Wepner claimed he had inspired that film's title character Rocky Balboa but Stallone has never confirmed it. On November 11, 2015, Ron Perlman signed on to play Al Braverman, Wepner's manager and trainer who guided him to the title fight with Ali. On November 11, 2015, Remstar Films acquired the Canadian distribution rights to the film.

Principal photography on the film began on October 26, 2015, in Suffern, New York, where some scenes were shot at the Lafayette Theatre. Filming ended on December 4, 2015.

== Release ==
The film had its world premiere at the Venice Film Festival on September 2, 2016. It went onto screen at the Toronto International Film Festival on September 10, 2016. In September 2016, IFC Films and Showtime Networks acquired U.S. distribution rights to the film, beating out bidders including Netflix, Sony Pictures Classics and A24. It will also screen at the Tribeca Film Festival in April 2017. It was released on May 5, 2017.

== Critical response ==
On the review aggregator website Rotten Tomatoes, the film has an approval rating of 81%, based on 84 reviews, with an average rating of 6.8/10. The website's critics consensus reads: "Chuck is hit with a handful of sports biopic clichés but ultimately punches above its weight, largely thanks to a muscular performance from Liev Schreiber." On Metacritic the film has a score of 68 out of 100 score, based on 29 critics, indicating "generally favorable" reviews. Glenn Kenny of The New York Times found the performances favorable writing, "Liev Schreiber has almost no physical resemblance to the boxer Chuck Wepner, but he is a terrific actor who pulls off that portrayal, partly through understatement."

== See also ==
- The Brawler, another biographical film about Wepner.
- List of boxing films
