= John Olson (forger) =

John Olson is a forger associated with the FBI's Operation Bullpen investigation. He pled guilty to forging thousands of Muhammad Ali and various other autographs. The FBI gathered information on the ring during a previous sting known as operation FOUL BALL. They launched the investigation that would ultimately culminate with a bust on October 13, 1999. They took down the biggest forgery ring in sports memorabilia history. Chuck Wepner, a former opponent of Ali and tough man boxer from Bayonne, New Jersey, would vouch for the autographs and John Olson and others would sign the items.

In 2013 John Olson resurfaced selling more forgeries to a local New Jersey man under the guise of being a sick and dying man selling memorabilia. He perpetrated the scam by showing a photo album that had him up close and personal with many of the boxers and athletes that he did the forgeries of.
