= Bill Sharkey (boxer) =

American boxer

Personal information
- Nationality: American
- Born: William Michael Sharkey; February 28, 1949 Baltimore, Maryland, U.S.
- Died: October 23, 1998 (aged 49)
- Height: 5 ft 11 in (180 cm)
- Weight: Heavyweight; Cruiserweight

Boxing career
- Reach: 72 in (183 cm)

Boxing record
- Total fights: 30
- Wins: 22
- Win by KO: 16
- Losses: 7
- Draws: 1

William Michael Sharkey (February 28, 1949 - October 23, 1998) was an American professional boxer who competed from 1974 to 1983, and fought for the first ever Cruiserweight title against Marvin Camel. He also fought against Heavyweight Champions Frank Bruno and Mike Weaver. Sharkey was murdered near his home in Pennsylvania and his body found on Oct. 24, 1998. In 2022 a $5K reward was offered by Pennsylvania State Police for information regarding his unsolved murder.

== Early life ==
When Sharkey was 19 years old, both of his parents died in what appeared to be a murder–suicide. Sharkey had a brief amateur boxing career from 1969 to 1970. During this time, Sharkey was allegedly involved with a street gang in Queens, New York, and was tried for manslaughter in 1970. Although he professed his innocence, in 1971 Sharkey was convicted and sent to prison. He was released from prison in 1974 and began his professional boxing career.

== Professional career ==
Sharkey became a professional boxer in 1974. In May of 1975 Sharkey defeated future Pennsylvania Boxing Hall of Fame inductee Jimmie Sykes at Embassy Hall, North Bergen. Although Sharkey was a natural 187-pounder, making him small for a heavyweight, he won his first 15 fights mostly by KO. In April 1977 Sharkey faced future Heavyweight Champion Mike Weaver at Beacon Theatre in New York. Although Sharkey scored a knock down, Weaver recovered and won a majority decision victory. Weaver was later quoted as saying, "That was one tough fight. He made me fight all the way down to the bell." On April 19, 1978 Sharkey defeated Vic Brown via unanimous decision.

In September 1978 Sharkey fought to a draw against contender Scott LeDoux at the Convention Center in Miami Beach. In January 1979 Sharkey fought Heavyweight contender Kallie Knoetze losing by KO in the 4th round. After the fight, Sharkey moved to the newly formed Cruiserweight weight class. In June 1979 the World Boxing Council (WBC) had Sharkey ranked as the #2 Cruiserweight in the world giving him the opportunity to fight for the first ever Cruiserweight title against Marvin Camel. Although, Sharkey lost in a unanimous decision, the new Cruiserweight class allowed Sharkey to fight at a more natural weight. Sharkey won 4 of his next 5 fights alternating between Cruiserweight and Heavyweight. In September 1983 Sharkey retired after a first round KO loss to future Heavyweight Champion Frank Bruno. Sharkey retired with a record of 22 wins 7 losses and 1 draw with 16 KOs.

== Death ==
In the 1990s Sharkey moved from Queens, New York to Pennsylvania with his wife and son. Sharkey was murdered near his home and his body found on Oct. 24, 1998. He was shot and placed in the trunk of his car, which was then set on fire. In 2022, a $5K reward was offered by Pennsylvania State Police for information regarding his unsolved murder.
