= Marvin Camel =

American boxer

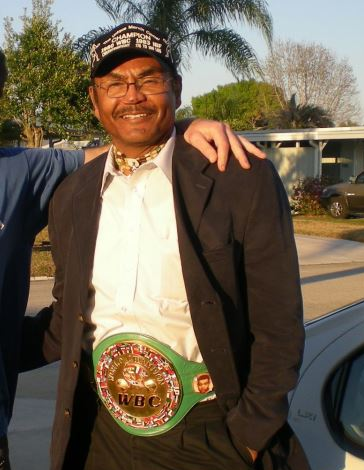

Personal information
- Born: December 24, 1951 (age 74) Ronan, Montana, U.S.
- Height: 6 ft 2 in (188 cm)
- Weight: Light heavyweight; Cruiserweight

Boxing career
- Reach: 79 in (201 cm)
- Stance: Southpaw

Boxing record
- Total fights: 62
- Wins: 45
- Win by KO: 21
- Losses: 13
- Draws: 4

Marvin Camel (born December 24, 1951) is a Native American former professional boxer who competed from 1974 to 1990. He was the first cruiserweight world champion, having held the WBC title in 1980 and the IBF title from 1983 to 1984. Furthermore, while many boxers of Native American descent had previously won world titles, Camel was the first Native American tribal member to become a major world boxing champion.

== Early life ==
Marvin Camel was born December 24, 1951, in Ronan, Montana, part of the Flathead Indian Reservation. His father was Henry Camel Sr. (né Campbell), an African-American WWII Navy veteran, and his mother was Alice Nenemay of the Pend d'Oreilles. Through his mother, Marvin Camel is a registered member of the Confederated Salish and Kootenai Tribes.

Camel grew up in a house with a wood stove and no running water. He had thirteen siblings, including one half-sibling with a different father. The elder Camel, who worked as a ranch hand twelve hours a day every day, was a strict disciplinarian who would beat Marvin with a belt. Marvin and most of his siblings were bullied on the reservation due to their partial African-American heritage, getting into a lot of fights growing up; his half-sibling was the only one who wasn't black.

In high school, Camel was a star athlete, having set a school record in track and being all-conference in football and basketball, as well as a stint at baseball. He took up boxing at fifteen and became a local AAU and Golden Gloves champion, making the national finals of both a combined fifteen times.

== Professional boxing career ==
Marvin Camel fought Bill Sharkey in the first cruiserweight title fight ever when the NABF sanctioned a bout for its continental title on June 5, 1979. Camel won the match, which led to the WBC sanctioning a cruiserweight title fight between him and Mate Parlov. Held in Split, Yugoslavia on December 8, 1979, the two fought to a fifteen-round draw in the first ever cruiserweight world title bout. In the rematch, held on March 5, 1980 in Las Vegas, Camel beat Parlov by unanimous decision after fifteen rounds for the inaugural WBC world cruiserweight title. Later that year, he lost the title in his first defense to Carlos De León, who had replaced David Pearce. After losing in a rematch to De León, he became the IBF's first world cruiserweight champion by beating Roddy MacDonald on December 13, 1983 in Halifax; MacDonald had also replaced David Pearce after the BBBoC would not sanction the cruiserweight division in the UK. Thus, Camel became a two-time cruiserweight world champion, the second in history after Carlos De León. Like the WBC title, he lost his first defense, this time against Lee Roy Murphy in 1984.

Following his second title reign, Camel went 2–2–8 in his last 12 fights. He lost his final bout in June 1990 against Eddie “Young Joe Louis” Taylor in Minneapolis. The ten-round decision left his lifetime mark at 45-13-5.

Camel's pro career took him from Ronan to thirteen states and seven foreign nations on three continents.

“I’ve had a good life, as far as boxing is concerned, winning two world titles, losing world titles, seeing the world,” Camel said in 2015. “Some things people only dream about having, I did it. I’ve been there. I’ve been to the top of the mountain. But I feel there’s still something out there that I’ve got to have, and I don’t know what it is.”

He is the subject of a biography released in December 2014, titled 'Warrior in the Ring' by Brian D'Ambrosio. The book was nominated for a High Plains Book Award and several other awards.

In December 2014, D'Ambrosio and Camel attended the 52nd Annual World Boxing Convention.

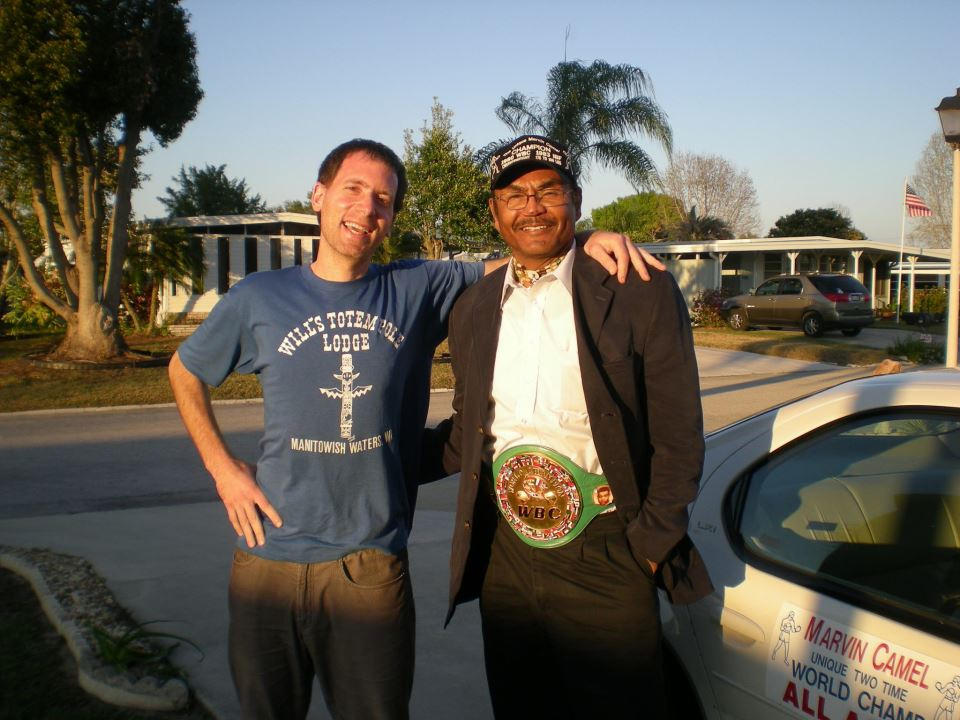
Brian D'Ambrosio, with Marvin Camel, "Warrior in the Ring"

== Honors ==
In 2006 at the World Boxing Council's 44th annual convention, WBC President José Sulaimán awarded Camel honorary champion status.

== Professional boxing record ==
62 fights	45 wins	13 losses
By knockout	21	8
By decision	24	5
Draws	4	

No.	Result	Record	Opponent	Type	Round, time	Date	Location	Notes
62	Loss	45–13–4	Eddie Taylor	MD	10	11 Jun 1990	Hyatt Regency Hotel, Minneapolis, Minnesota, U.S.	
61	Loss	45–12–4	Joe Hipp	TKO	6 (10)	2 Dec 1989	Saint Martin's Pavilion, Lacey, Washington, U.S.	
60	Win	45–11–4	Jerome Hill	UD	8	6 Nov 1989	Civic Center, Butte, Montana, U.S.	
59	Win	44–11–4	J.J. Cottrell	UD	10	25 Sep 1989	Civic Center, Billings, Montana, U.S.	
58	Draw	43–11–4	Trent Surratt	TD	1 (?), 1:13	10 Aug 1989	Four Seasons Arena, Great Falls, Montana, U.S.	
57	Loss	43–11–3	James Salerno	TKO	6	31 May 1988	Milan, Italy	
56	Loss	43–10–3	Ralf Rocchigiani	PTS	10	26 Apr 1988	Cologne, Nordrhein-Westfalen, Germany	
55	Loss	43–9–3	Taoufik Belbouli	TKO	4	10 Oct 1987	Zenith Palais, Paris, France	
54	Loss	43–8–3	Virgil Hill	KO	1 (10), 2:52	1 May 1987	City Arena, Grand Forks, North Dakota, U.S.	
53	Loss	43–7–3	José María Flores Burlón	UD	10	8 Aug 1986	Pergamino, Buenos Aires, Argentina	
52	Draw	43–6–3	Jimmy Bills	PTS	10	22 May 1986	Boise, Idaho, U.S.	
51	Loss	43–6–2	Lee Roy Murphy	RTD	14 (15), 3:00	6 Oct 1984	MetraPark, Billings, Montana, U.S.	Lost IBF cruiserweight title
50	Win	43–5–2	Roddy MacDonald	TKO	5 (15), 2:49	13 Dec 1983	Halifax Metro Centre, Halifax, Nova Scotia, Canada	Won inaugural IBF cruiserweight title
49	Win	42–5–2	Rocky Sekorski	RTD	8 (12)	21 May 1983	MetraPark, Billings, Montana, U.S.	Retained USBA cruiserweight title
48	Loss	41–5–2	John Odhiambho	TKO	2 (8)	11 Feb 1983	K.B. Hallen, Copenhagen, Denmark	
47	Win	41–4–2	Leonardo Rodgers	RTD	4 (12)	30 Jun 1982	City Auditorium, Omaha, Nebraska, U.S.	Retained USBA cruiserweight title
46	Loss	40–4–2	Carlos de León	TKO	8 (15)	24 Feb 1982	Playboy Hotel and Casino, Atlantic City, New Jersey, U.S.	For WBC cruiserweight title
45	Win	40–3–2	Bash Ali	UD	12	2 Oct 1981	Cow Palace, Daly City, California, U.S.	Won USBA cruiserweight title
44	Win	39–3–2	Willie Shannon	TKO	3 (12), 0:27	11 Aug 1981	Showboat Casino and Hotel, Sport Pavilion, Las Vegas, Nevada, U.S.	Retained Nevada cruiserweight title
43	Win	38–3–2	Rahim Muhammad	UD	12	5 May 1981	Showboat Hotel and Casino, Sports Pavilion, Las Vegas, Nevada, U.S.	Won vacant Nevada cruiserweight title
42	Win	37–3–2	Ron Draper	TKO	6 (10), 1:42	24 Apr 1981	MetraPark, Billings, Montana, U.S.	
41	Loss	36–3–2	Carlos de León	MD	15	25 Nov 1980	Superdome, New Orleans, Louisiana, U.S.	Lost WBC cruiserweight title
40	Win	36–2–2	Mate Parlov	UD	15	31 Mar 1980	Caesars Palace, Las Vegas, Nevada, U.S.	Won inaugural WBC cruiserweight title
39	Draw	35–2–2	Mate Parlov	MD	15	8 Dec 1979	Sportski Centar Gripe, Split, Yugoslavia	For inaugural WBC cruiserweight title
38	Win	35–2–1	David Cabrera	KO	3 (10), 1:24	30 Aug 1979	La Villa Real Convention Center, McAllen, Texas, U.S.	
37	Win	34–2–1	Macka Foley	TKO	2 (10), 1:52	1 Aug 1979	Silver Slipper, Las Vegas, Nevada, U.S.	
36	Win	33–2–1	Bill Sharkey	UD	12	5 Jun 1979	Adams Field House, Missoula, Montana, U.S.	Won vacant NABF cruiserweight title
35	Win	32–2–1	David Smith	TKO	9 (10)	24 Apr 1979	University of Montana Fieldhouse, Missoula, Montana, U.S.	
34	Win	31–2–1	Jim Ingram	UD	10	28 Feb 1979	Silver Slipper, Las Vegas, Nevada, U.S.	
33	Win	30–2–1	Bob Heflin	KO	2 (10), 2:01	3 Jan 1979	Silver Slipper, Las Vegas, Nevada, U.S.	
32	Win	29–2–1	Tom Bethea	KO	2 (12), 2:30	11 Nov 1978	Missoula, Montana, U.S.	
31	Win	28–2–1	Dale Grant	UD	12	13 Sep 1978	Civic Center, Butte, Montana, U.S.	
30	Win	27–2–1	Ibar Arrington	UD	10	22 Aug 1978	North Idaho JC Gym, Coeur d'Alene, Idaho, U.S.	
29	Win	26–2–1	Chuck Warfield	KO	5 (10)	27 May 1978	Saint Ignatius Highschool Gym, Missoula, Montana, U.S.	
28	Win	25–2–1	Pete McIntyre	UD	10	7 Apr 1978	Civic Center, Butte, Montana, U.S.	
27	Win	24–2–1	Bobby Lloyd	UD	10	9 Mar 1978	Century II Convention Center, Wichita, Kansas, U.S.	
26	Win	23–2–1	David Smith	UD	10	8 Feb 1978	Sahara Hotel, Las Vegas, Nevada, U.S.	
25	Win	22–2–1	Karl Zurheide	RTD	7 (10), 3:00	8 Dec 1977	Silver Slipper, Las Vegas, Nevada, U.S.	
24	Win	21–2–1	Ron Wilson	UD	10	29 Aug 1977	Pony Palace Arena, Pablo, Montana, U.S.	
23	Loss	20–2–1	Danny Brewer	TKO	6 (10)	28 Jun 1977	Seattle Center Arena, Seattle, Washington, U.S.	
22	Win	20–1–1	Gary Summerhays	UD	12	6 May 1977	Adams Field House, Missoula, Montana, U.S.	
21	Draw	19–1–1	Dale Grant	PTS	10	15 Feb 1977	Seattle Center Arena, Seattle, Washington, U.S.	
20	Win	19–1	Lionel Ford	UD	10	26 Jan 1977	Silver Slipper, Las Vegas, Nevada, U.S.	
19	Win	18–1	Larry Castaneda	UD	10	20 Nov 1976	Seattle Center Arena, Seattle, Washington, U.S.	
18	Win	17–1	Matthew Saad Muhammad	MD	10	23 Oct 1976	Adams Field House, Missoula, Montana, U.S.	
17	Win	16–1	Johnny Townsend	UD	10	25 Sep 1976	Coliseum, Spokane, Washington, U.S.	
16	Win	15–1	Johnny Townsend	UD	10	28 Aug 1976	Eagles Aerie, Missoula, Montana, U.S.	
15	Loss	14–1	Matthew Saad Muhammad	SD	10	17 Jul 1976	Stockton, California, U.S.	
14	Win	14–0	Angel Oquendo	UD	10	8 May 1976	Adams Field House, Missoula, Montana, U.S.	
13	Win	13–0	Rafael Gutierrez	UD	10	7 Apr 1976	Silver Slipper, Las Vegas, Nevada, U.S.	
12	Win	12–0	Don Meloncon	TKO	3 (10), 2:24	18 Feb 1976	Silver Slipper, Las Vegas, Nevada, U.S.	
11	Win	11–0	Pedro Vega	KO	1 (10), 3:10	14 Jan 1976	Silver Slipper, Las Vegas, Nevada, U.S.	
10	Win	10–0	Danny Brewer	UD	10	19 Nov 1975	Silver Slipper, Las Vegas, Nevada, U.S.	
9	Win	9–0	Terry Lee	TKO	8 (10), 2:46	24 Sep 1975	Silver Slipper, Las Vegas, Nevada, U.S.	
8	Win	8–0	Ron Wilson	UD	10	20 Aug 1975	Silver Slipper, Las Vegas, Nevada, U.S.	
7	Win	7–0	Fernando Lee Jones	RTD	6 (10)	28 May 1975	Silver Slipper, Las Vegas, Nevada, U.S.	
6	Win	6–0	Amado Vasquez	KO	3 (10), 1:14	30 Apr 1975	Silver Slipper, Las Vegas, Nevada, U.S.	
5	Win	5–0	Jack Johnson	UD	8	2 Apr 1975	Silver Slipper, Las Vegas, Nevada, U.S.	
4	Win	4–0	Chico Valdez	KO	2 (6), 1:56	19 Feb 1975	Silver Slipper, Las Vegas, Nevada, U.S.	
3	Win	3–0	George Clark	TKO	4 (6), 1:31	22 Jan 1975	Silver Slipper, Las Vegas, Nevada, U.S.	
2	Win	2–0	James T. Jackson	TKO	4 (6), 2:29	25 Feb 1974	Fairgrounds Arena, Boise, Idaho, U.S.	
1	Win	1–0	Joe Williamson	TKO	1 (4), 2:14	25 Jun 1973	Civic Center, Butte, Montana, U.S.	

== See also ==
- List of cruiserweight boxing champions

Achievements
Inaugural Champion	WBC cruiserweight champion March 31, 1980 – November 25, 1980	Succeeded by Carlos de León
Inaugural Champion	IBF cruiserweight champion December 13, 1983 – October 6, 1984	Succeeded by Lee Roy Murphy
