= You Must Be Joking! (1986 film) =

- DVD Cover
- Directed by: Elmo De Witt
- Written by: Leon Schuster; Fanus Rautenbach
- Produced by: Elmo De Witt; Hermann Visser
- Starring: Leon Schuster; Mike Schutte; Kallie Knoetze; Golda Raff; Janine Pretorius; Martino
- Narrated by: David Blood; Tony Sanderson
- Edited by: Gerrie Van Wyk
- Music by: Johan Van Rensburg; Leon Schuster
- Production companies: Elmo De Witt Films; Kavalier Films
- Distributed by: Ster-Kinekor Films
- Release date: 1986
- Running time: 96 minutes
- Country: South Africa
- Languages: English; Afrikaans

You Must Be Joking! is a 1986 South African candid camera comedy film, directed by Elmo De Witt who also produced it with Hermann Visser in collaboration with Johan Scholtz. It stars Leon Schuster in his first feature role, Mike Schutte, Kallie Knoetze, Golda Raff, Martino and Janine Pretorius. It became popular with South African audiences and gave rise to the sequel, You Must be Joking! Too.

== Synopsis ==
In a series of short skits, Leon Schuster uses candid camera and several disguises to stitch up the general public of South Africa. Such sketches include:

- The watermelon pulse test, where Leon shows that a watermelon is only ripe when it does not have a heartbeat, much to the confusion of the seller.
- Cooking on the bonnet of a car, while upsetting the traffic police.
- Supposedly killing a cow in a butcher's shop.

== Cast ==
- Leon Schuster
- Mike Schutte
- Kallie Knoetze
- Golda Raff
- Janine Pretorius
- Martino
