= Lou Esa =

American boxer (born 1952)

Personal information
- Nickname: Big Lou Esa
- Nationality: American
- Born: January 10, 1952 (age 74) Wayne, New Jersey
- Height: 6 ft 6 in (198 cm)
- Weight: Heavyweight

Boxing career
- Stance: Orthodox

Boxing record
- Total fights: 26
- Wins: 19
- Win by KO: 16
- Losses: 6
- Draws: 1
- No contests: 0

Lou Esa (born January 10, 1952) is an American former professional heavyweight boxer from Wayne, New Jersey, who had 26 fights with 16 knockouts in 19 wins.

== Amateur career ==
Esa began his amateur boxing career at the age of 17 in New Jersey, accumulating a record of 7–1 with 7 knockouts. His only loss was to future heavyweight champion Larry Holmes. At the age of 20, while preparing for the Olympic trials, Esa was hit in the face with a bottle and required over 300 facial stitches, which ended his amateur career.

== Professional career ==
After playing defensive end in football for Saint Peter's College in New Jersey, Esa tried out for the Miami Dolphins. He suffered a helmet strike to his knee which abruptly ended his football career. A few months later, after he successfully rehabilitated his knee, Esa heard that boxing legend Muhammad Ali was training at a local gym, so he headed down for the opportunity to meet his hero. While at the gym watching Ali, Esa hung out in the back and worked on the heavy bag. Angelo Dundee was impressed with Esa's technique and power and introduced himself. The next day Esa met with the Dundee brothers to discuss his professional career.

Dundee introduced Esa to Murray Gaby who became his manager and Dwayne Simpson who became his trainer. Esa fought under the Mendoza Group, who he credits for helping his professional boxing career. A few weeks later, on July 22, 1975, Esa made his professional debut at the Miami Beach Convention Hall against James Edwards. Esa won his first five fights, all by first-round knockout, before suffering his first loss in April 1976. Esa came back and won 13 of 15 fights with one draw and one loss by unanimous decision.

In October 1977, Esa fought a six-round undercard bout in Las Vegas against the newly turned professional and future heavyweight champion John Tate. Esa, who had been arrested in his hotel room and had spent the previous night in jail, was knocked out in the third round. The fight's promoters Lou Duva and Bob Arum were criticized for promoting a mismatch.

Following losses in three of four fights during the next three years, Esa's career ended in 1981. According to his cornerman, Ferdie Pacheco, Esa had a precarious reputation as a journeyman who "couldn't take a hard rap" and was "never in shape" enough to last more than a couple of rounds.

In 2012, Lou Esa was inducted into the New Jersey Boxing Hall of Fame.

== Professional boxing record ==
19 Wins (16 knockouts, 3 decisions), 6 Losses, 1 Draws
Res.	Record	Opponent	Type	Rd., Time	Date	Location
Loss	19-6-1	(United States) Fossie Schmidt	KO	1	1981-08-18	(United States) Blaisdell Center, Honolulu, Hawaii
Loss	19-5	(United States) Barry Funches	KO	5	1980-04-18	(United States) Felt Forum, New York City
Win	19-4	(United States) David Starkey	KO	2	1980-03-16	(United States) Jai Alai Fronton, Miami, Florida
Loss	18-4	(United States) Bill Connell	UD	8	1979-07-31	(United States) Ice World, Totowa, New Jersey
Loss	18-3	(United States) John Tate	KO	3	1977-10-22	(United States) Aladdin Theater, Las Vegas, Nevada
Loss	18-2-1	(United States) Roger Russell	UD	8	1977-07-17	(United States) Convention Hall, Miami, Florida
Win	18-1-1	(United States) Tommy Howard	KO	2	1977-06-29	(United States) Gainesville, Florida
Win	17-1-1	(United States) John L. Johnson	KO	2	1977-06-14	(United States) Orlando, Florida
Win	16-1-1	(United States) Roger Russell	UD	6	1977-05-11	(United States) Madison Square Garden, New York City
Win	15-1-1	(United States) Willie Goodman	KO	2	1977-04-28	(United States) Tampa, Florida
Win	14-1-1	(United States) Jimmy Phillips	KO	2	1977-03-25	(United States) Orlando, Florida
Win	13-1-1	(United States) Leroy Diggs	KO	4	1977-03-15	(United States) Miami Beach, Florida
Win	12-1-1	(United States) Phil Fritz	UD	6	1977-03-11	(United States) Orlando, Florida
Win	11-1-1	(United States) Fred Wallace	KO	1	1977-02-16	(United States) Sports Stadium, Orlando, Florida
Win	10-1-1	(United States) Leroy Keane	KO	1	1977-01-25	(United States) Sports Stadium, Orlando, Florida
Win	9-1-1	(United States) Billy Grant	UD	4	1976-10-15	(United States) Sportatorium, Hollywood, Florida
Draw	8-1-1	(United States) Tom Prater	Pts	8	1976-07-20	(United States) Miami Beach Convention Center, Miami Beach, Florida
Win	8-1	(United States) Moses Harrell	KO	2	1976-06-08	(United States) Miami Beach, Florida
Win	7-1	(United States) George Holden	KO	4	1976-06-01	(United States) Miami Beach, Florida
Win	6-1	(United States) Angelo Garafolo	KO	2	1976-05-21	(United States) Paterson, New Jersey
Loss	5-1	(United States) Sylvester Bump Kelly	KO	4	1976-04-30	(United States) Capital Centre, Landover, Maryland
Win	5-0	(United States) Gene Idelette	KO	1	1975-12-16	(United States) Convention Hall, Miami Beach, Florida
Win	4-0	(United States) Mike Green	KO	1	1975-11-25	(United States) Miami Beach Convention Center, Miami Beach, Florida
Win	3-0	(United States) Hydra Lacy	KO	1	1975-10-28	(United States) Miami Beach Convention Center, Miami Beach, Florida
Win	2-0	(United States) Clarence Morris	KO	1	1975-08-05	(United States) Miami Beach, Florida
Win	1-0	(United States) James Edwards	KO	1	1975-07-22	(United States) Convention Hall, Miami Beach, Florida
