= John Tate (boxer) =

American boxer (1955–1998)

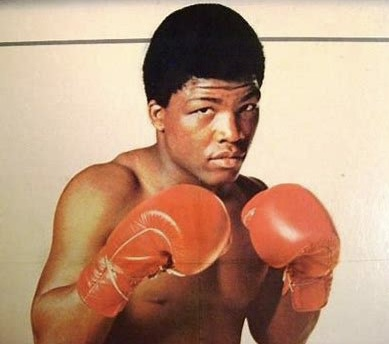
- Tate circa 1979

Personal information
- Nickname: Big John
- Born: January 29, 1955 Marion, Arkansas, U.S.
- Died: April 9, 1998 (aged 43) Knoxville, Tennessee, U.S.
- Height: 6 ft 4 in (193 cm)
- Weight: Heavyweight

Boxing career
- Reach: 80 in (203 cm)
- Stance: Orthodox

Boxing record
- Total fights: 37
- Wins: 34
- Win by KO: 23
- Losses: 3
Medal record
Men's amateur boxing
Representing United States
Olympic Games
Bronze medal – third place	1976 Montreal	Heavyweight

John Tate (January 29, 1955 – April 9, 1998) was an American professional boxer and held the WBA heavyweight championship from 1979 to 1980. As an amateur he won a bronze medal in the heavyweight division at the 1976 Summer Olympics. He scored notable victories over future Heavyweight Champion Gerrie Coetzee as well as beating number three ranked heavyweight Kallie Knoetze in 1979 and knocking out contender Bernardo Mercado and fringe contender Duane Bobick.

== Amateur career ==
"Big John" Tate (named due to his 6-foot-4-inch or 193-centimetre height) captured a bronze medal at the 1976 Summer Olympics in Montreal, losing to Olympic boxing legend Teófilo Stevenson in a semifinal bout.

=== 1976 Olympic results ===
- Round of 16: Defeated Andrzej Biegalski (Poland) by decision, 5–0
- Quarterfinal: Defeated Peter Hussing (West Germany) by decision, 3–2
- Semifinal: Lost to Teófilo Stevenson (Cuba) KO round 1 (was awarded bronze medal)

Tate lost in the finals of the 1975 National Golden Gloves to Emory Chapman. He lost in the quarterfinals the next year in a split decision to Michael Dokes. He avenged his loss to Dokes in the Olympic Trials by decision, and beat 1976 National AAU Champion Marvin Stinson to advance to the Olympic team. He also beat future heavyweight champion Greg Page by two close decisions, one in the quarterfinals of the 1975 National Golden Gloves tournament.

Tate met his future trainer, Ace Miller, during an amateur tournament in Knoxville, Tennessee. Tate and Miller worked together through 1983.

== Professional career ==
Tate turned pro in 1977 and scored a series of high-profile wins, knocking out highly ranked contenders Duane Bobick, Bernardo Mercado, and Kallie Knoetze. He captured the vacant WBA title on October 20, 1979, by defeating Gerrie Coetzee by decision, succeeding Muhammad Ali, who had relinquished the title that summer. Tate's fights with Knoetze and Coetzee were held in Apartheid South Africa, the latter before 80,000 fans.

Tate lost the title to Mike Weaver in his first defence just five months later. Tate was well ahead on all scorecards going into the 15th and final round when the big hitting Weaver landed a left hook punch to the chin that left the champion twitching unconscious on the canvas for several minutes.

Tate came back from the loss on June 20, 1980, against up and coming Trevor Berbick. This was on the undercard of the legendary fight between Sugar Ray Leonard and Roberto Durán. The former champion started well, but tired throughout the bruising battle and was defeated by Berbick early in the 9th round—being knocked out by a punch that caught him on the back of the head and left him unconscious.

Tate was in the frame to challenge Larry Holmes for the heavyweight title in 1984, but the fight fell apart due to injury. Tate boxed on and off for the remainder of the 1980s but was often grossly overweight. He weighed in at an astonishing 281 pounds (127 kg) prior to losing a points decision to journeyman Noel Quarless in London, in his final fight in 1988. Tate's professional career record was 34–3, with 23 wins by knockout.

== Unsanctioned bouts ==
In 1994, Tate had three unsanctioned fights. The Welshman David Pearce knocked him out in the third of those fights.

== Outside the ring ==
Tate's life after his championship reign was brief and troubled, suffering from a cocaine addiction during the 1980s, being convicted on petty theft and assault charges, serving time in prison and at times panhandling on the streets of Knoxville, Tennessee. He was rumored to have ballooned to over 600 pounds (270 kg) in his post-fighting years.

== Death ==
On April 9, 1998, Tate died of injuries sustained following a one-car automobile accident. It was determined that he suffered a massive stroke, caused by a brain tumor, while driving. The pickup truck crashed into a utility pole. Two other passengers were not seriously injured.

== Professional boxing record ==
37 fights	34 wins	3 losses
By knockout	23	2
By decision	10	1
By disqualification	1	0

No.	Result	Record	Opponent	Type	Round, time	Date	Location	Notes
37	Loss	34–3	Noel Quarless	PTS	10	Mar 30, 1988	York Hall, London, England	
36	Win	34–2	Wesley Smith	UD	4	Jan 16, 1988	Viking Hall, Bristol, Tennessee, U.S.	
35	Win	33–2	Mark Green	KO	1 (6)	Dec 19, 1987	Bristol, Tennessee, U.S.	
34	Win	32–2	Calvin Jones	MD	4	Nov 28, 1987	International Speedway, Bristol, Tennessee, U.S.	
33	Win	31–2	Steve Eisenbarth	TKO	1 (6)	Apr 17, 1986	Convention Center, Bakersfield, California, U.S.	
32	Win	30–2	Marty Capasso	KO	2 (10), 1:26	Aug 19, 1983	Auditorium, West Palm Beach, Florida, U.S.	
31	Win	29–2	Donnie Long	UD	10	Apr 10, 1983	Hilton, Pittsburgh, Pennsylvania, U.S.	
30	Win	28–2	Danny Sutton	TKO	5 (10), 2:55	Jan 13, 1983	Viking Hall, Bristol, Tennessee, U.S.	
29	Win	27–2	Bruce Grandham	TKO	3 (10)	Aug 27, 1982	Bristol, Tennessee, U.S.	
28	Win	26–2	Leroy Boone	UD	10	Jul 8, 1982	Knoxville, Tennessee, U.S.	
27	Win	25–2	Leroy Caldwell	UD	10	Mar 25, 1982	Showboat Hotel and Casino, Las Vegas, Nevada, U.S.	
26	Win	24–2	Chuck Gardner	KO	1 (10), 2:25	Nov 27, 1981	Civic Coliseum, Knoxville, Tennessee, U.S.	
25	Win	23–2	Barry Funches	TKO	7 (10), 2:59	Oct 15, 1981	Sands, Atlantic City, New Jersey, U.S.	
24	Win	22–2	Clayman Parker	TKO	1 (10), 2:47	Aug 8, 1981	Knoxville, Tennessee, U.S.	
23	Win	21–2	Harvey Steichen	UD	10	Feb 15, 1981	Civic Coliseum, Knoxville, Tennessee, U.S.	
22	Loss	20–2	Trevor Berbick	KO	9 (10), 0:22	Jun 20, 1980	Olympic Stadium, Montreal, Quebec, Canada	
21	Loss	20–1	Mike Weaver	KO	15 (15), 2:15	Mar 31, 1980	Stokely Athletic Center, Knoxville, Tennessee, U.S.	Lost WBA heavyweight title
20	Win	20–0	Gerrie Coetzee	UD	15	Oct 20, 1979	Loftus Versfeld Stadium, Pretoria, South Africa	Won vacant WBA heavyweight title
19	Win	19–0	Kallie Knoetze	TKO	8 (12), 2:52	Jun 2, 1979	Independence Stadium, Mmabatho, Bophuthatswana	
18	Win	18–0	Duane Bobick	KO	1 (10), 2:15	Feb 17, 1979	Market Square Arena, Indianapolis, Indiana, U.S.	
17	Win	17–0	Ron Draper	KO	5 (10), 1:55	Dec 9, 1978	Cobo Arena, Detroit, Michigan, U.S.	
16	Win	16–0	Roy Wallace	KO	9 (10), 0:43	Oct 14, 1978	The Summit, Houston, Texas, U.S.	
15	Win	15–0	Johnny Boudreaux	SD	10	Aug 26, 1978	Houston, Texas, U.S.	
14	Win	14–0	Walter Santemore	KO	6 (10), 2:45	Jul 7, 1978	Sports Stadium, Orlando, Florida, U.S.	
13	Win	13–0	Bernardo Mercado	TKO	2 (10), 2:24	Jun 22, 1978	Madison Square Garden, New York City, New York, U.S.	
12	Win	12–0	Reinaldo Gorosito	KO	2 (10)	May 13, 1978	Sports Stadium, Orlando, Florida, U.S.	
11	Win	11–0	Harold Carter	DQ	4 (10)	Apr 25, 1978	Sports Stadium, Orlando, Florida, U.S.	
10	Win	10–0	Leon Shaw	KO	7 (10), 2:32	Mar 14, 1978	Sports Stadium, Orlando, Florida, U.S.	
9	Win	9–0	James Dixon	KO	3 (8)	Jan 29, 1978	Hyatt Regency, Knoxville, Tennessee, U.S.	
8	Win	8–0	Charlie Jordan	KO	1 (10)	Dec 3, 1977	Knoxville, Tennessee, U.S.	
7	Win	7–0	Frank Schram	TKO	1 (6)	Nov 18, 1977	Caesars Palace, Paradise, Nevada, U.S.	
6	Win	6–0	Lou Esa	KO	3 (6), 2:58	Oct 22, 1977	The Aladdin, Paradise, Nevada, U.S.	
5	Win	5–0	Eddie Lopez	MD	6	Sep 13, 1977	Grand Olympic Auditorium, Los Angeles, California, U.S.	
4	Win	4–0	Walter Santemore	PTS	6	Aug 23, 1977	Memphis, Tennessee, U.S.	
3	Win	3–0	Baker Tinsley	KO	2 (6)	Aug 20, 1977	High School Gym, Pikeville, Kentucky, U.S.	
2	Win	2–0	Norm Kues	KO	1 (6), 1:45	Jun 1, 1977	Forum, Montreal, Quebec, Canada	
1	Win	1–0	Jerry Thompkins	TKO	5 (6), 2:40	May 7, 1977	Kiel Auditorium, St. Louis, Missouri, U.S.	

Sporting positions
World boxing titles
Vacant Title last held by Muhammad Ali	WBA heavyweight champion October 20, 1979 – March 31, 1980	Succeeded by Mike Weaver
