= Chuck Wepner =

American boxer (born 1939)

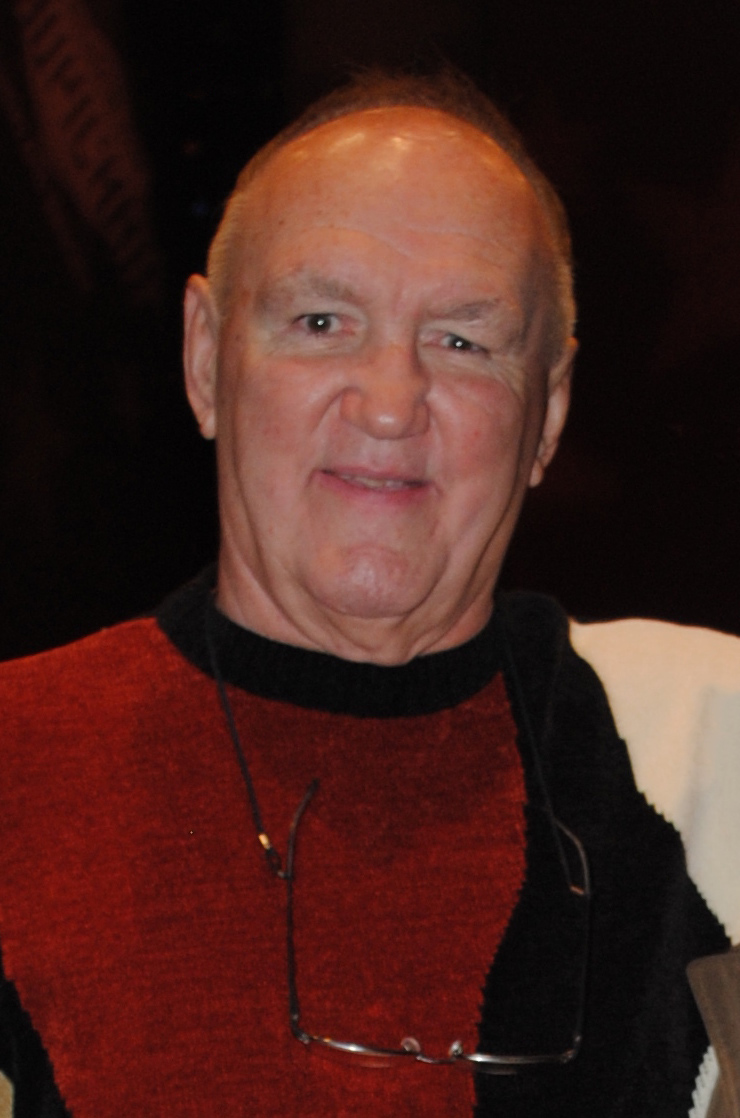
- Wepner in 2012

Personal information
- Nickname: The Bayonne Bleeder
- Born: Charles Wepner; February 26, 1939 (age 87) New York City, U.S.
- Height: 6 ft 5 in (196 cm)
- Weight: Heavyweight

Boxing career
- Stance: Orthodox

Boxing record
- Total fights: 52
- Wins: 36
- Win by KO: 17
- Losses: 14
- Draws: 2

Charles Wepner (born February 26, 1939) is an American former professional boxer. He fell just nineteen seconds short of a full fifteen rounds against world heavyweight champion Muhammad Ali in a 1975 championship fight. Wepner also scored notable wins over Randy Neumann and former world heavyweight champion Ernie Terrell. He was also the last man to fight former undisputed world heavyweight champion Sonny Liston.

Wepner's boxing career, and fight with Ali, inspired the 1976 film Rocky, and other life events were chronicled in the 2016 film, Chuck. He was also the subject of the 2019 film The Brawler.

== Early life ==
Charles Wepner was born in a cheap hotel February 26, 1939, in New York City. He is of German, Ukrainian, and Polish descent.

Wepner learned to fight on the streets of Bayonne, New Jersey saying, "This was a tough town with a lot of people from the docks and the naval base and you had to fight to survive". Wepner was about a year old when he moved in with his grandmother on 28th Street near Hudson Boulevard (now Kennedy Boulevard). He was raised by his mother and grandparents, living in a room that was a converted coal shed until he was 13. He was an avid player of sports in his youth, playing basketball for the Police Athletic League. At Bayonne High School, his height helped him get a spot on the basketball team.

Aged 15 (or 16), inspired by Battle Cry (12 March 1955), having persuaded his mother to sign his 'phony papers', the underage Wepner enlisted for three years in the U.S. Marines. In the Marines, he became a member of the boxing team, developing a reputation for being able to withstand other boxers' punches, and becoming a military champion at one of the airbases. A 1975 Sports Illustrated article said that Wepner had saved the lives of three Marine pilots, pulling them from blazing airplanes.

== Amateur career ==
Wepner won the New York Golden Gloves Novice Heavyweight Championship in 1964. He ended his career at 16–0.

== Professional career ==
Wepner turned professional in 1964 and became a popular boxer on the Northeast's Club Boxing circuit, where he began posting many wins and some losses fighting throughout the region, including in arenas close to his boyhood home such as North Bergen and Secaucus.

Nicknamed "The Bayonne Bleeder" due to repeated facial injuries in the ring, he took the name that was initially meant as an insult and made it his nom de guerre. In an interview with the BBC, Wepner said "I was a big bleeder. I had 328 stitches in my career. My nose was broken nine times in 16 years. And, uh, it never fazed me, you know?"

Wepner had formerly boxed while a member of the United States Marine Corps, and had worked as a bouncer before turning pro. He was the New Jersey state heavyweight boxing champion, but after losing bouts to George Foreman (by cut eye stoppage in three) and Sonny Liston (by TKO in nine) many boxing fans thought that his days as a contender were numbered. After the match with Liston, Wepner needed 72 stitches in his face. After his retirement from boxing, Wepner stated that Liston was the hardest puncher he ever fought.

However, after losing to Joe Bugner by a cut eye stoppage in three in England, Wepner won nine of his next eleven bouts, including victories over Charlie Polite and former WBA heavyweight champion Ernie Terrell.

=== Muhammad Ali fight ===
In 1975, it was announced that Wepner would challenge Muhammad Ali for the world heavyweight title. According to the Cleveland Plain Dealer (February 9, 1975, Page 4-C), Carl Lombardo invested $1.3 million to finance the Wepner-Ali heavyweight title bout. According to a Time article, "In Stitches", Ali was guaranteed a $1.5 million purse and Wepner was guaranteed $100,000. That was considerably more than Wepner had ever earned, so he "needed no coaxing." Wepner spent eight weeks training in the Catskill Mountains under the guidance of Al Braverman (trainer and noted cutman) and Bill Prezant (manager).

Prezant prophesied that the match would be a big surprise. Preparing for the bout was the first time Wepner had been able to train full-time. Since 1970, his typical day had consisted of road work in the morning, followed by his job selling liquor during the day. Then he was able to spend his nights working out and sparring in Bayonne boxing clubs. The match was held on March 24 at the Richfield Coliseum in Richfield, Ohio, south of Cleveland. Before the match, a reporter asked Wepner if he thought he could survive in the ring with Ali, to which Wepner replied, "I've been a survivor my whole life ... if I survived the Marines, I can survive Ali."

In the ninth round, Wepner scored a knockdown, which Ali said occurred because Wepner was stepping on his foot, and published photographs showed Wepner stepping on Ali's foot at the time of the knockdown. Wepner went to his corner and said to his manager, Al Braverman, "Al, start the car. We're going to the bank. We are millionaires." Wepner's manager replied: "You better turn around. He's getting up and he looks pissed off."

In the remaining rounds, Ali decisively outboxed Wepner, opening up cuts above both of Wepner's eyes and breaking his nose. Wepner was far behind on the scorecards when Ali knocked him down with 19 seconds left in the 15th round. The referee counted to seven before calling a technical knockout.

After the Ali-Wepner bout, Sylvester Stallone wrote the script for Rocky, which was released in theatres in 1976. Like Wepner, (Rocky) Balboa lasts 15 rounds but, unlike Wepner, he actually "goes the distance". For years after Rocky was released, Stallone denied that Wepner provided inspiration for the movie, though he eventually admitted it.

=== Late career ===
In 1976, Wepner fought professional wrestler André the Giant and lost by countout after Andre threw him out of the ring.

On October 25, 1977, Wepner lost to Antonio Inoki in a Wrestler vs Boxer match held in Japan.

Wepner's last match was on May 2, 1978, for the New Jersey state heavyweight championship against a new rising prospect, Scott Frank, noted for using a heavy left hook. Wepner lost the match in a 12-round decision, but again proved durable. He announced his retirement afterwards.

== Later life ==
After his retirement from boxing, Wepner began abusing drugs. In 1979, Sylvester Stallone wanted to cast Wepner as a sparring partner in Rocky II, but he failed the audition due to his drug problems.

In November 1985, Wepner was arrested on drug charges when he was found with four ounces of cocaine in an undercover police investigation. Under a plea-bargain agreement, he was sentenced in 1988 to ten years in prison. He served 17 months in Northern State Prison, Newark, New Jersey, then spent another 20 months in New Jersey's intensive supervision program.

In 2003, Wepner sued Sylvester Stallone, seeking payment for his use as the inspiration for Rocky and the film series. The lawsuit was settled with Stallone in 2006 for an undisclosed amount.

As of 2010, Wepner had been working for 10 years with his third wife Linda in the liquor sales field for Majestic Wines and Spirits in Carlstadt, New Jersey, and was an expert in consumer liquors, wines and spirits.

ESPN aired a documentary titled The Real Rocky on October 25, 2011, The ESPN film features a clip of Wepner's ninth round knockdown of Muhammad Ali in their 1975 world heavyweight title bout. Michael Tollin, who was a producer on the ESPN documentary, would also be a producer of the first of the two films about Wepner's career, which was released in 2016.

=== Ring appearances ===
Wepner occasionally makes ringside appearances at boxing cards in his home state of New Jersey, signing autographs and posing for photos with boxing fans. On October 12, 2012, Wepner appeared ringside with former World Light Heavyweight champion Mike Rossman in Atlantic City, New Jersey, at a Tropicana Casino & Resort Atlantic City fight card featuring a WBA NABA Lightweight title bout in the main event. Wepner held the WBA NABA heavyweight title during his boxing career.

== Portrayals and inspirations ==
- Sylvester Stallone's character Rocky Balboa and portions of the Rocky film series were inspired by the life of Chuck Wepner. For instance, it was speculated that a scene from the 1982 film Rocky III had been influenced by Wepner's fight against Andre the Giant, as the movie features a match versus wrestler Hulk Hogan as "Thunderlips", who throws Rocky out of the ring.
- Liev Schreiber played Wepner in the 2016 sports film, Chuck.
- Zach McGowan played the role of Wepner in the 2019 sports film, The Brawler.
- In 2022, a statue of Wepner was unveiled in Collins Park in Bayonne. The project had been several years in the works.

== Professional boxing record ==
52 fights	36 wins	14 losses
By knockout	17	9
By decision	19	5
Draws	2	

No.	Result	Record	Opponent	Type	Round(s), time	Date	Location	Notes
52	Loss	36–14–2	(United States) Scott Frank	UD	12	September 26, 1978	(United States) Ice World, Totowa, New Jersey, U.S.	Lost USA New Jersey State heavyweight title
51	Win	36–13–2	(United States) Tom Healy	TKO	5 (10), 2:13	June 2, 1978	(United States) Old Armory, Jersey City, New Jersey, U.S.	
50	Win	35–13–2	(United States) Johnny Blaine	TKO	3 (10)	April 7, 1978	(United States) Embassy Hall, North Bergen, New Jersey, U.S.	
49	Loss	34–13–2	(Canada) Horst Geisler	TKO	10 (10), 1:19	May 20, 1977	(United States) Broome County Arena, Binghamton, New York, U.S.	
48	Loss	34–12–2	(South Africa) Mike Schutte	PTS	10	February 19, 1977	Wembley Stadium, Johannesburg, South Africa	
47	Loss	34–11–2	(United States) Duane Bobick	TKO	6 (10), 1:12	October 2, 1976	(United States) Utica College Sports Complex, Utica, New York, U.S.	
46	Win	34–10–2	(United States) Tommy Sheehan	TKO	2 (10), 1:01	May 6, 1976	(United States) Kearny High School Gym, Kearny, New Jersey, U.S.	
45	Win	33–10–2	(United States) Johnny Dolan	KO	3 (10)	November 29, 1975	(United States) National Guard Armory, Fort Lauderdale, Florida, U.S.	
44	Win	32–10–2	(United States) Johnny Evans	TKO	4 (10), 0:59	November 13, 1975	(United States) Exposition Building, Portland, Maine, U.S.	
43	Loss	31–10–2	(United States) Muhammad Ali	TKO	15 (15), 2:41	March 24, 1975	(United States) Richfield Coliseum, Richfield, Ohio U.S.	For WBA and WBC heavyweight titles
42	Win	31–9–2	(United States) Terry Hinke	TKO	11 (12), 1:10	September 3, 1974	(United States) Salt Palace, Salt Lake City, Utah, U.S.	
41	Win	30–9–2	(United States) Charley Polite	TKO	4 (10)	May 23, 1974	(United States) Embassy Hall, North Bergen, New Jersey, U.S.	
40	Win	29–9–2	(United States) Randy Neumann	TKO	6 (12)	March 8, 1974	(United States) Madison Square Garden, New York City, New York, U.S.	Retained USA New Jersey State heavyweight title
39	Win	28–9–2	(United States) Billy Williams	PTS	10	January 17, 1974	(United States) Embassy Hall, North Bergen, New Jersey, U.S.	
38	Win	27–9–2	(United States) Ernie Terrell	PTS	12	June 23, 1973	(United States) Convention Hall, Atlantic City, New Jersey, U.S.	Won vacant National Americas heavyweight title
37	Win	26–9–2	(United States) Billy Marquart	PTS	12	March 15, 1973	(United States) Embassy Hall, North Bergen, New Jersey, U.S.	Retained USA New Jersey State heavyweight title
36	Win	25–9–2	(United States) John Clohessy	PTS	10	December 7, 1972	(United States) Marist High School, Bayonne, New Jersey, U.S.	
35	Win	24–9–2	(United States) Randy Neumann	PTS	12	April 15, 1972	(United States) Armory, Jersey City, New Jersey, U.S.	Won USA New Jersey State heavyweight title
34	Loss	23–9–2	(United States) Randy Neumann	PTS	12	December 9, 1971	(United States) Embassy Hall, North Bergen, New Jersey, U.S.	Lost USA New Jersey State heavyweight title
33	Win	23–8–2	(United States) Mike Boswell	TKO	10 (10)	October 14, 1971	(United States) Embassy Hall, North Bergen, New Jersey, U.S.	
32	Win	22–8–2	(United States) Jesse Crown	KO	4 (10)	September 16, 1971	(United States) Embassy Hall, North Bergen, New Jersey, U.S.	
31	Loss	21–8–2	(United States) Jerry Judge	TKO	5 (8)	January 6, 1971	(United States) Catholic Youth Center, Scranton, Pennsylvania, U.S.	
30	Loss	21–7–2	(United Kingdom) Joe Bugner	RTD	3 (10), 3:00	September 8, 1970	(United Kingdom) Empire Pool, London, England	
29	Loss	21–6–2	(United States) Sonny Liston	RTD	9 (10), 3:00	June 29, 1970	(United States) Armory, Jersey City, New Jersey, U.S.	
28	Win	21–5–2	(Mexico) Manuel Ramos	UD	10	January 26, 1970	(United States) Madison Square Garden, New York City, New York, U.S.	
27	Win	20–5–2	(Puerto Rico) Pedro Agosto	UD	10	December 19, 1969	(United States) Felt Forum, New York City, New York, U.S.	
26	Loss	19–5–2	(United States) George Foreman	TKO	3 (8), 0:54	August 18, 1969	(United States) Madison Square Garden, New York City, New York, U.S.	
25	Loss	19–4–2	(United States) José Roman	PTS	10	June 22, 1969	Hiram Bithorn Stadium, San Juan, Puerto Rico, U.S.	
24	Win	19–3–2	(United States) Mike Bruce	PTS	8	April 28, 1969	(United States) Plaza Arena, Secaucus, New Jersey, U.S.	
23	Win	18–3–2	(Peru) Roberto Davila	MD	10	March 14, 1969	(United States) Felt Forum, New York City, New York, U.S.	
22	Win	17–3–2	(United States) Jerry Tomasetti	TKO	1 (10), 2:20	December 13, 1968	(United States) Felt Forum, New York City, New York, U.S.	
21	Win	16–3–2	(United States) Mert Brownfield	MD	10	November 9, 1968	(United States) Scranton, Pennsylvania, U.S.	
20	Win	15–3–2	(United States) Forest Ward	TKO	7 (8)	September 28, 1968	(United States) Madison Square Garden, New York City, New York, U.S.	
19	Win	14–3–2	(United States) Mike Bruce	PTS	8	May 20, 1968	(United States) Plaza Arena, Secaucus, New Jersey, U.S.	
18	Win	13–3–2	(United States) Eddie Vick	SD	10	April 30, 1968	(United States) Walpole, Massachusetts, U.S.	
17	Win	12–3–2	(United States) Clay Thomas	TKO	3 (8), 1:13	January 22, 1968	(United States) Plaza Arena, Secaucus, New Jersey, U.S.	
16	Win	11–3–2	(United States) Charlie Harris	TKO	6 (8)	November 27, 1967	(United States) Plaza Arena, Secaucus, New Jersey, U.S.	
15	Loss	10–3–2	(United States) Jerry Tomasetti	TKO	5 (6), 1:07	July 19, 1967	(United States) Madison Square Garden, New York City, New York, U.S.	
14	Win	10–2–2	(United States) Don McAteer	TKO	7 (8), 1:32	April 28, 1967	(United States) Armory, Jersey City, New Jersey, U.S.	Won vacant USA New Jersey State heavyweight title
13	Win	9–2–2	(United States) Lou Hicks	UD	6	January 18, 1967	(United States) Catholic Youth Center, Scranton, Pennsylvania, U.S.	
12	Win	8–2–2	(United States) Dave Centi	PTS	6	October 21, 1966	(United States) Madison Square Garden, New York City, New York, U.S.	
11	Win	7–2–2	(United States) Johnny Deutsch	TKO	6 (6)	August 3, 1966	(United States) Memorial Stadium, Scranton, Pennsylvania U.S.	
10	Win	6–2–2	(United States) Cleo Daniels	UD	6	April 6, 1966	(United States) Westchester County Center, White Plains, New York, U.S.	
9	Win	5–2–2	(United States) Jerry Tomasetti	UD	6	February 22, 1966	(United States) Sunnyside Gardens, New York City, New York, U.S.	
8	Loss	4–2–2	(United States) Buster Mathis	TKO	3 (6), 1:58	January 17, 1966	(United States) Madison Square Garden, New York City, New York, U.S.	
7	Loss	4–1–2	(United States) Bob Stallings	SD	6	October 19, 1965	(United States) Sunnyside Gardens, New York City, New York, U.S.	
6	Draw	4–0–2	(United States) Everett Copeland	PTS	6	March 23, 1965	(United States) Sunnyside Gardens, New York City, New York, U.S.	
5	Win	4–0–1	(United States) Raymond Patterson	SD	6	January 19, 1965	(United States) Sunnyside Gardens, New York City, New York, U.S.	
4	Win	3–0–1	(United States) Jerry Tomasetti	UD	4	December 18, 1964	(United States) Madison Square Garden, New York City, New York, U.S.	
3	Draw	2–0–1	(United States) Everett Copeland	SD	6	October 27, 1964	(United States) Sunnyside Gardens, New York City, New York, U.S.	
2	Win	2–0	(United States) Rudy Pavesi	PTS	4	August 14, 1964	(United States) Madison Square Garden, New York City, New York, U.S.	
1	Win	1–0	(United States) George Cooper	KO	3 (4), 1:35	August 5, 1964	(United States) City Stadium, Bayonne, New Jersey, U.S.	

Titles in boxing

Regional/International titles

New Jersey state heavyweight champion (200+ lbs) (2x)

Continental Americas Heavyweight titles (200+ lbs)
