= Muhammad Ali vs. Chuck Wepner =

Boxing competition

Muhammad Ali vs Chuck Wepner
- Date: March 24, 1975
- Venue: Richfield Coliseum, Richfield Township, Ohio
- Titles on the line: WBA, WBC and The Ring undisputed heavyweight championship

Tale of the tape
Boxer	(United States) Muhammad Ali	(United States) Chuck Wepner
Nickname	"The Greatest"	"The Bayonne Bleeder"
Hometown	Louisville, Kentucky	New York City, New York
Purse	$1,600,000	$100,000
Pre-fight record	45–2 (32 KO)	30–9–2 (12 KO)
Age	33 years, 2 months	36 years
Height	6 ft 3 in (191 cm)	6 ft 5 in (196 cm)
Weight	224 lb (102 kg)	225 lb (102 kg)
Style	Orthodox	Orthodox
Recognition	WBA, WBC and The Ring undisputed Heavyweight Champion	The Ring; No. 8 Ranked Heavyweight

Result
- Ali won via 15th round TKO

Muhammad Ali vs. Chuck Wepner was a professional boxing match contested on March 24, 1975, for the undisputed heavyweight championship.

Ali won the bout by knocking out Wepner in the fifteenth round. The fight is known for being among the four fights in which Ali was officially knocked down, and for inspiring the 1976 film Rocky.

== Background ==
Wepner was 36 years old at this time, and after winning eight straight fights (including a win over former WBA heavyweight champion Ernie Terrell), had risen to number 8 in the heavyweight ranks. He had earned the moniker "The Bayonne Bleeder" because he would readily get cut during boxing fights, and because he was from Bayonne, New Jersey. Prior to the Ali fight, Wepner had fought with Sonny Liston in Liston's final boxing match; after the bout Wepner had required 120 stitches.

This was Ali's first boxing bout after reclaiming the heavyweight championship from George Foreman in The Rumble in the Jungle. The fighting odds were 10:1 in favor of Ali, and thus was seen as an easy win for Ali who did minimal training for it. Asked why he had not trained harder for this fight, Ali had commented:

"An old man was once asked by a young man, 'How is it that you look so good and stay in such fine condition at your advanced age?' The old man replied, 'It is the preserved energy of my youth which is now maintaining my life.' That is why my career spanned twenty years. I didn't burn myself out training for guys like Al Lewis, Jürgen Blin, and Chuck Wepner".

== Buildup ==
Red Smith of The New York Times reported on financing of the fight, "Don King induced a Cleveland tycoon named Carl Lombardo to underwrite the show for $1.3‐million. Video Techniques put in $200,000 and that just about took care of the nut. Video Techniques had snatched the champion out of Top Rank's clutches but now had a mismatch in a cornfield; a million‐dollar turkey in a 5 and 10 cent store."

Ali and Wepner did some television interviews together to promote the fight. They were on The Mike Douglas Show when Ali leaned towards Wepner during a break and said: "Hey Chuck. Do me a favor. When they come back on stage, call me an effing n****r...We'll make it look like a grudge match and sell tickets.” Upon Wepner's refusal to grant him the favor he sought, Ali started shouting as soon as the show's host reappeared on the set: "Do you know what he called me? Do you know what he called me?" Wepner then covered Ali's mouth with his hand. "Ali was a promoter. He was a great promoter and they were trying to hype up the fight," Wepner explained.

Ali would go on to donate 50 cents of each ticket sold for the closed circuit television coverage of the fight to help the drought-stricken Sahel region of West Africa.

=== Mrs. Wepner and Stallone ===
Before the fight, Wepner was lying in bed with his wife when he told her something like "Even if I don't win, I just want to prove I belong there." Wepner later shared this line with Sylvester Stallone who used it in Rocky. On the day of the fight Wepner presented a "very sexy" blue negligee to his wife and told her to wear it that night in bed since she would be sleeping with the new heavyweight champion of the world. On the night of the fight, Mrs. Wepner was wearing the negligee when Wepner returned to their hotel room - having been sewn up with twenty three stitches. She proceeded to ask him: "Okay, bigshot...Do I go to Ali's room, or does he come to mine?"

== The fight ==
Ali controlled most of the fight with Wepner, using his superior speed and boxing skills to mostly neutralize the challenger's offense. Despite quickly falling behind on points from the start, Wepner bravely fought on, taking everything the champion threw at him.

Besides his courage and stamina, Wepner utilized his size along with a repertoire of "fouls and dirty tricks", which were used in the fight. Prior to the fight Wepner told his manager "Ali is the king of boxin'", whereupon the manager responded with "Yeah, yeah, Chuck, but in the ring you're the king of dirty fighting. You're both royalty."

Ali would later complain that Wepner had thrown "rabbit punches"—punches on the back of the head—on him, and had expressed his displeasure that Tony Perez, the referee, allowed the usage of this tactic. Ali retaliated by throwing six punches to the back of Wepner's head in the first round. Similar incidents would continue throughout the fight.

A major surprise came in the 9th round when Wepner scored a knockdown, after landing a body shot on the champion while stepping forward. This would be the fourth and final time Ali would be officially knocked down in a professional fight. Ali later disputed the official knockdown, claiming that Wepner had stepped on his foot and then pushed him, causing him to lose his balance and fall. Film and photographic records support Ali's claim. However, Wepner maintains that it was a genuine knockdown.

After knocking Ali down, Wepner went to his corner and told his manager: "Start the car up, Al, we're going to the bank, we're millionaires!", whereupon the manager told Wepner: "You better turn around—your guy's getting up and he looks pissed off."

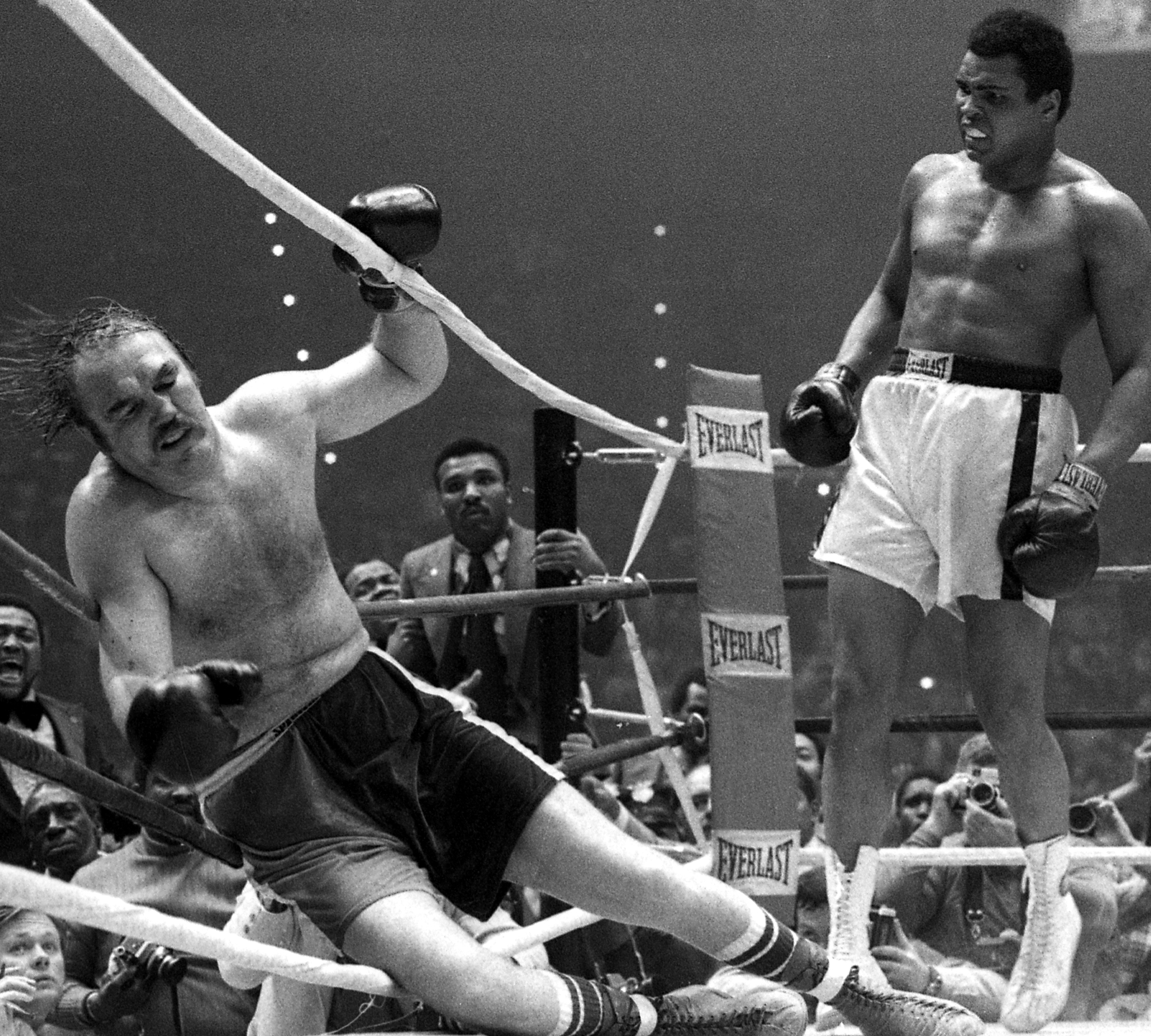
Wepner falling in the last round

Ali went on to punish Wepner for the remaining six rounds, opening cuts on his face and causing his eyes to swell up. The final round culminated with a series of fierce combinations that sent Wepner staggering around the ring before being knocked down by one final punch. He tried to rise and beat the count, but the fight was stopped by referee Tony Perez upon seeing the challenger's poor condition.

== Legacy and influence on Rocky ==
=== Post fight ===
Ali was bitter about the controversial knockdown, and later commented to reporters that Wepner "was dirty and fought like a woman." Despite this, later in life the two became friends and shared a mutual admiration of one another.

=== Films ===
The fight was sufficiently inspiring for Sylvester Stallone (who watched the fight live) to partly base the character of Rocky Balboa on Wepner, and of Apollo Creed on Ali. Stallone would later rush home after the fight and in less than four days of near constant writing, had completed his screenplay about an underdog fighter who gets a shot at the heavyweight title. The screenplay, titled Rocky, would be purchased by United Artists, with the agreement that Stallone would also star in the film. Released the following year, Rocky would go on to win three Oscars (including Best Picture) and became the highest-grossing film of 1976.

Stallone would later describe his experience watching the fight and how it contributed to his eventual creation:

Chuck Wepner, a battling, bruising club fighter who had never made the big time, was having his shot. It wasn't at all regarded as a serious battle. But as the fight progressed, this miracle unfolded. He hung in there. People went absolutely crazy. Wepner was knocked out in the 15th and final round, almost lasting the distance. We had witnessed an incredible triumph of the human spirit and we loved it. That night, Rocky Balboa was born. People looked on him as the all-American tragedy, a man without much mentality and few social graces. But he has deep emotion and spirituality and good patriotism. And he has a good nature, although nature has not been particularly good to him. I have always seen him as a 20th Century gladiator in a pair of sneakers. Like so many of us, he is out of sync with the times. To all this, I injected doses of my own personal life, of my frustration at not getting anywhere.

— Sylvester Stallone

At the 1977 Academy Awards, Stallone and Ali presented the Academy Award for Best Supporting Actress together, with Ali comedically announcing that he was the real Apollo Creed and mock sparring with Stallone.

Although Stallone admitted the fight was an important part of the creative process, he has also stated that other fighters (most notably Rocky Marciano) were important inspirations as well. Neither Wepner or Ali received any official credit in the film, resulting in Wepner later suing Stallone in 2003. The case was settled out of court, with Wepner receiving an undisclosed amount of money and the right to claim he was the inspiration for the film.

Chuck Wepner's life and his title fight with Ali have been the subject of several documentaries and biopics, the most notable of which include the 2012 ESPN television special The Real Rocky, and the biographical films Chuck and The Brawler, released in 2016 and 2019 respectively.

== Undercard ==
Confirmed bouts:

Winner	Loser	Weight division/title belt(s) disputed	Result
(United States) Larry Holmes	(United States) Charley Green	Heavyweight (8 rounds)	1st-round KO
(United States) Bobby Cassidy	(United States) Karl Zurheide	Light Heavyweight (8 rounds)	Unanimous decision.
(United States) Fred Houpe	(United States) Tommy Sheehan	Heavyweight (? rounds)	2nd-round TKO

Preceded by vs. George Foreman	Muhammad Ali's bouts 24 March 1975	Succeeded by vs. Ron Lyle
Preceded by vs. Terry Hinke	Chuck Wepner's bouts 24 March 1975	Succeeded by vs. Johnny Evans
