= Mike Schutte (boxer) =

South African boxer, actor, comedian and singer (1950–2008)

Personal information
- Nickname: "The Tank"
- Born: Michael Richard Schutte; 9 December 1950 Boksburg, Transvaal, Union of South Africa
- Died: 14 July 2008 (aged 57) Vanderbijlpark, Gauteng, South Africa
- Height: 1.79 m (5 ft 10 in)
- Weight: Heavyweight

Boxing career

Boxing record
- Total fights: 49
- Wins: 38
- Win by KO: 28
- Losses: 9
- Draws: 2

Michael Richard Schutte (9 December 1950 – 14 July 2008) was a South African boxer, actor, comedian and singer.

== Professional career ==
In May 1973, he contested the vacant Transvaal heavyweight title against Johnny Britz but was disqualified in the second round. Two months later he fought a rematch against Johnny Britz winning the Transvaal heavyweight title on points. During April 1974, he fought Jimmy Richards for the South African heavyweight title losing in a technical knockout. He would fight Jimmy Richards for the title two more times obtaining the South African heavyweight title in September 1975 on points. He would retain the title for less than a year when Gerrie Coetzee fought him in August 1976 and lost when he was disqualified in the sixth round. Shutte attempted to regain the title from Gerrie Coetzee in April 1977 but lost on points. He fought his last fight against Neil Malpass in June 1979 and announced his retirement. He was trained by Alan Toweel.

== Filmography ==
Schutte starred in a number of South African films, playing himself in some of them:

- Io sto con gli ippopotami (1979)
- Funny People II (1983)
- Target Scorpion (1983)
- Wolhaarstories (1983)
- You Must Be Joking! (1986)
- Hiding Out (1987)
- You Must Be Joking Too! (1987)
- Oh Schuks ... I'm Gatvol! (2004)

== Death ==
Mike Schutte died on 14 July 2008 at the Emfuleni Medi-Clinic in Vanderbijlpark of liver failure, thrombosis and an enlarged heart after being admitted two days earlier.

== Professional boxing record ==
38 Wins (28 knockouts, 10 decisions), 9 Losses (4 knockouts, 5 decision), 2 Draws
Result	Record	Opponent	Type	Rounds	Date	Location	Notes
Win	38–9–2	(United Kingdom) Neil Malpass	PTS	8	18 June 1979	Wembley Sports Pavilion, Johannesburg, Gauteng, South Africa	
Draw	37–9–2	(United States) Dwane Bonds	PTS	8	2 June 1979	Independence Stadium, Mmabatho, Bophuthatswana	
Win	37–9	(Rhodesia) Walter Ringo Starr	KO	2 (10)	30 April 1979	New Kingsmead Soccer Stadium, Durban, KwaZulu-Natal, South Africa	
Loss	36–9	(United States) Duane Bobick	RTD	8 (10)	20 March 1978	Good Hope Centre, Cape Town, Western Cape, South Africa	
Win	36–8	(South Africa) John Nyalunga	KO	1 (6)	4 February 1978	Rand Stadium, Johannesburg, Gauteng, South Africa	
Loss	35–8	(South Africa) Kallie Knoetze	KO	2 (10)	13 August 1977	Wembley Ice Rink, Johannesburg, Gauteng, South Africa	
Win	35–7	(South Africa) Fraser Memela	RTD	4 (10)	9 May 1977	West Ridge Tennis Stadium, Durban, KwaZulu-Natal, South Africa	
Loss	34–7	(South Africa) Gerrie Coetzee	PTS	12	16 April 1977	Wembley Stadium, Johannesburg, Gauteng, South Africa	
Win	34–6	(United States) Chuck Wepner	PTS	10	19 February 1977	Wembley Stadium, Johannesburg, Gauteng, South Africa	
Win	33–6	(United States) Rodney Bobick	UD	10	5 October 1976	Rand Stadium, Johannesburg, Gauteng, South Africa	
Loss	32-6	(South Africa) Gerrie Coetzee	DQ	6 (12)	16 August 1976	West Ridge Tennis Stadium, Durban, KwaZulu-Natal, South Africa	
Win	32-5	(Italy) Giuseppe Ros	PTS	10	9 July 1976	West Ridge Tennis Stadium, Durban, KwaZulu-Natal, South Africa	
Win	31-5	(Netherlands) Rudie Lubbers	KO	3 (10)	22 May 1976	Rand Stadium, Johannesburg, Gauteng, South Africa	
Win	30-5	(United States) Terry Hinke	KO	3 (10)	4 May 1976	West Ridge Park Tennis Stadium, Durban, KwaZulu-Natal, South Africa	
Win	29-5	(United States) Tommy Kost	KO	2 (10)	13 April 1976	West Ridge Park Tennis Stadium, Durban, KwaZulu-Natal, South Africa	
Win	28-5	(United States) Pat Duncan	KO	4 (10)	15 March 1976	West Ridge Park Tennis Stadium, Durban, KwaZulu-Natal, South Africa	
Win	27-5	(United States) Obie English	RTD	6 (10)	14 February 1976	Ellis Park Tennis Stadium, Johannesburg, Gauteng, South Africa	
Win	26–5	(Puerto Rico) Jose Roman	TKO	7 (10)	1 January 1976	City Hall, Durban, KwaZulu-Natal, South Africa	
Win	25-5	(United States) Bill Carson	RTD	3 (10)	12 December 1975	West Ridge Tennis Stadium, Durban, KwaZulu-Natal, South Africa	
Win	24–5	(Puerto Rico) Jose Roman	PTS	10	29 November 1975	Rand Stadium, Johannesburg, Gauteng, South Africa	
Win	23–5	(United States) Roy Wallace	RTD	3 (10)	27 October 1975	West Ridge Tennis Stadium, Durban, KwaZulu-Natal, South Africa	
Win	22–5	(South Africa) Jimmy Richards	PTS	12	13 September 1975	Rand Stadium, Johannesburg, Gauteng, South Africa	
Win	21–5	(Mexico) Alfredo Mongol Ortiz	RTD	7 (8)	30 June 1975	West Ridge Tennis Stadium, Durban, KwaZulu-Natal, South Africa	
Win	20–5	(South Africa) Johnny Britz	TKO	1 (10)	17 May 1975	Wembley Ice Rink, Johannesburg, Gauteng, South Africa	
Win	19-5	(United States) Larry Beilfuss	RTD	4 (10)	7 April 1975	Ellis Park Rugby Stadium, Johannesburg, Gauteng, South Africa	
Loss	18–5	(South Africa) Jimmy Richards	PTS	12	8 February 1975	Badminton Hall, Showgrounds, Pretoria, Gauteng, South Africa	
Loss	18–4	(Germany) Conny Velensek	PTS	10	30 November 1974	Rand Stadium, Johannesburg, Gauteng, South Africa	
Win	18–3	(South Africa) Dawie du Preez	TKO	3 (10)	24 July 1974	Goodwood Showgrounds, Cape Town, Western Cape, South Africa	
Loss	17–3	(South Africa) Jimmy Richards	TKO	12	20 April 1974	Badminton Hall, Showgrounds, Pretoria, Gauteng, South Africa	
Win	17–2	(United States) Paul Simonetti	RTD	2 (10)	2 March 1974	Ellis Park Tennis Stadium, Johannesburg, Gauteng, South Africa	
Loss	16–2	(South Africa) Dawie du Preez	KO	1 (10)	28 January 1974	Goodwood Showgrounds, Cape Town, Western Cape, South Africa	
Win	16–1	(Argentina) Miguel Angel Paez	RTD	5 (10)	20 November 1973	West Ridge Park, Durban, KwaZulu-Natal, South Africa	
Win	15–1	(South Africa) Chris Roos	TKO	1 (10)	13 October 1973	Milner Park Showgrounds, Johannesburg, Gauteng, South Africa	
Win	14–1	(South Africa) Johnny Britz	PTS	10	14 July 1973	Milner Park Showgrounds, Johannesburg, Gauteng, South Africa	
Loss	13–1	(South Africa) Johnny Britz	DQ	2 (10)	12 May 1973	Ellis Park Tennis Stadium, Johannesburg, Gauteng, South Africa	
Draw	13–0	(South Africa) Johnny Britz	PTS	8	7 February 1973	Badminton Hall, Showgrounds, Pretoria, Gauteng, South Africa	
Win	13–0	(South Africa) Jimmy Richards	PTS	10	4 November 1972	Badminton Hall, Showgrounds, Pretoria, Gauteng, South Africa	
Win	12–0	(South Africa) Japie Pretorius	TKO	1 (10)	27 October 1972	Dick Fourie Stadium, Vereeniging, Gauteng, South Africa	
Win	11–0	(South Africa) Jimmy Richards	PTS	10	30 September 1972	Badminton Hall, Showgrounds, Pretoria, Gauteng, South Africa	
Win	10–0	(United Kingdom) Peter Boddington	TKO	1 (10)	2 September 1972	Wembley Stadium, Johannesburg, Gauteng, South Africa	
Win	9–0	(United Kingdom) Dave Hallinan	KO	3 (8)	15 July 1972	Portuguese Hall, Johannesburg, Gauteng, South Africa	
Win	8–0	(South Africa) George Labuschagne	KO	1 (8)	26 June 1972	West Ridge Tennis Stadium, Durban, Natal, South Africa	
Win	7–0	(Spain) Mariano Echevarria	PTS	8	3 June 1972	Portuguese Hall, Johannesburg, Transvaal, South Africa	
Win	6–0	(South Africa) Chris Botha	TKO	1 (8)	20 March 1972	Hartleyvale Stadium, Cape Town, Cape Province, South Africa	
Win	5–0	(Italy) Romano Peviani	KO	2 (8)	19 February 1972	Ellis Park Tennis Stadium, Johannesburg, Transvaal, South Africa	
Win	4–0	(South Africa) Raymond Cross	TKO	2 (6)	17 January 1972	Hall of Industries, Goodwood, Cape Town, Cape Province, South Africa	
Win	3–0	(South Africa) Jan Delport	TKO	2 (8)	7 August 1971	Ellis Park Tennis Stadium, Johannesburg, Transvaal, South Africa	
Win	2–0	(South Africa) George Labuschagne	KO	1 (6)	15 May 1971	Badminton Hall, Showgrounds, Pretoria, Transvaal, South Africa	
Win	1–0	(South Africa) Doug de Wet	KO	1 (6)	8 May 1971	Ellis Park Tennis Stadium, Johannesburg, Transvaal, South Africa	
