= Kallie Knoetze =

South African boxer

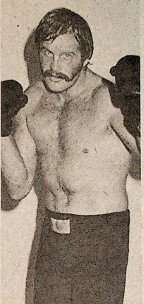
- Knoetze c. 1979

Personal information
- Nickname: Die Bek van Boomstraat
- Born: Nikolaas Jacobus Knoetze; 24 April 1953 (age 73) Roodepoort, South Africa
- Height: 1.85 m (6 ft 1 in)
- Weight: Heavyweight

Boxing career

Boxing record
- Total fights: 27
- Wins: 21
- Win by KO: 20
- Losses: 6
- Draws: 0

Kallie Knoetze (born as Nikolaas Jacobus Knoetze on 24 April 1953) is a retired South African heavyweight boxer and actor.

== Boxing career ==
As an amateur Knoetze fought future professional world champion and fellow South African Gerrie Coetzee six times, each winning three bouts.

Knoetze turned professional in 1976, and started his career with six consecutive KO wins. In his seventh fight he was disqualified against Reinaldo Raul Gorosito, and in his eighth bout he lost a ten rounds points decision to Coetzee.

From late 1976 to 1979 he went on an 11-fight winning streak, which included avenging his loss to Gorosito via a ten-rounds decision (this was the only bout in the streak that went the distance) and knocking out US Olympian Duane Bobick and former Muhammad Ali opponent Richard Dunn.

In January 1979 Knoetze defeated future cruiserweight contender Bill Sharkey by KO in the 4th round, making him rated number-three heavyweight in the world. Knoetze fought an elimination bout for the vacant WBA heavyweight belt, but he lost to another US Olympian, John Tate, via a twelfth-round knockout. In the other elimination bout, Coetzee defeated Leon Spinks and then went on to lose to Tate for the WBA title.

Knoetze never fought for a major title again. He fought seven more bouts, winning four and losing three, before retiring in 1981 after a second-round knockout loss to Robbie Williams.

== Acting career ==
Between 1979 and 1991 Knoetze acted in four movies, his best known role being primary antagonist Rosco Dunn, a former corrupt professional boxer-turned-military sergeant, in the 1982 film Bomber.

== Professional boxing record ==
21 Wins (20 knockouts, 1 decisions), 6 Losses (4 knockouts, 2 decision), 0 Draws Archived 2019-08-13 at the Wayback Machine
Result	Record	Opponent	Type	Rounds	Date	Location	Notes
Loss	21–6	(South Africa) Robbie Williams	TKO	10	21 July 1981	West Ridge Tennis Stadium, Durban, South Africa	
Win	21–5	(United States) John Baca	KO	10	2 May 1981	Ellis Park Tennis Stadium, Johannesburg, South Africa	
Win	20–5	(West Germany) Bernd August	RTD	10	13 March 1981	Joekies Ice Rink, Welkom, South Africa	
Loss	19–5	(South Africa) Jimmy Abbott	TKO	10	8 March 1980	Ellis Park Tennis Stadium, Johannesburg, South Africa	
Loss	19–4	(United States) Mike Koranicki	KO	10	19 December 1979	Good Hope Centre, Cape Town, South Africa	
Win	19–3	(United States) Randy Stephens	KO	10	20 October 1979	Loftus Versfeld Stadium, Pretoria, South Africa	
Win	18–3	(West Germany) George Butzbach	RTD	10	14 September 1979	New Kingsmead Soccer Stadium, Durban, South Africa	
Loss	17–3	(United States) John Tate	TKO	12	2 June 1979	Independence Stadium, Mmabatho, Bophuthatswana	
Win	17–2	(United States) Bill Sharkey	KO	10	13 January 1979	(United States) Convention Center, Miami Beach, Florida, U.S.	
Win	16–2	(United States) G.G. Maldonado	KO	10	26 August 1978	Independence Stadium, Mmabatho, Bophuthatswana	
Win	15–2	(United Kingdom) Denton Ruddock	KO	10	1 July 1978	Loftus Versfeld Stadium, Pretoria, South Africa	
Win	14–2	(United States) Duane Bobick	KO	3	4 February 1978	Rand Stadium, Johannesburg, South Africa	
Win	13–2	(United Kingdom) Richard Dunn	KO	10	10 September 1977	Ellis Park Tennis Stadium, Johannesburg, South Africa	
Win	12–2	(South Africa) Mike Schutte	KO	10	13 August 1977	Wembley Ice Rink, Johannesburg, South Africa	
Win	11–2	(United Kingdom) Neville Meade	KO	10	4 June 1977	Milner Park Showgrounds, Johannesburg, South Africa	
Win	10–2	(United Kingdom) Ishaq Hussein	KO	10	6 May 1977	Loftus Versfeld Stadium, Pretoria, South Africa	
Win	9–2	(Argentina) Reinaldo Raul Gorosito	PTS	10	4 March 1977	Loftus Versfeld Stadium, Pretoria, South Africa	
Win	8–2	(Nigeria) Ngozika Ekwelum	TKO	10	29 January 1977	Wembley Stadium, Johannesburg, South Africa	
Win	7–2	(United States) Jerry Huston Jr	RTD	10	7 December 1976	West Ridge Tennis Stadium, Durban, South Africa	
Loss	6–2	(South Africa) Gerrie Coetzee	PTS	10	30 October 1976	Rand Stadium, Johannesburg, South Africa	
Loss	6–1	(Argentina) Reinaldo Raul Gorosito	DQ	10	5 October 1976	Rand Stadium, Johannesburg, South Africa	
Win	6–0	(United States) Frank Schram	RTD	10	13 August 1976	Callie Human Hall, University of OFS, Bloemfontein, South Africa	
Win	5–0	(Uruguay) Domingo Silveira	TKO	10	19 June 1976	Skilpad Hall Showgrounds, Pretoria, South Africa	
Win	4–0	(Italy) Amedeo Laureti	TKO	10	21 May 1976	Showgrounds Central Arena, Bloemfontein, South Africa	
Win	3–0	(West Germany) Horst Lang	KO	6	27 March 1976	Badminton Hall, Showgrounds, Pretoria, South Africa	
Win	2–0	(West Germany) Karsten Honhold	KO	6	22 March 1976	Ellis Park Tennis Stadium, Johannesburg, South Africa	
Win	1–0	(South Africa) Jeffrey Ellis	KO	4	28 February 1976	Wembley Ice Rink, Johannesburg, South Africa	
