= Major League Baseball Authentication Program =

Sports memorabilia authentication system

The Major League Baseball Authentication Program, or MLB Authentication Program, is a program run by Major League Baseball Properties, the product licensing arm of Major League Baseball, to guarantee the authenticity of baseball merchandise and memorabilia. The centerpiece of the system is a tamper-resistant security tape sticker with an embedded hologram. Each sticker carries a unique alphanumeric code. The sticker is affixed to all game-used merchandise and memorabilia, while information about the item is entered into a computer database. Between 500,000 and 600,000 items are authenticated each season.

== Background ==
=== Operation Bullpen ===
Major League Baseball started running an authentication program in 2001 after the FBI "Operation Bullpen" became widely publicized. Phase 1 of Operation Bullpen began in 1999 and uncovered $100 million worth of memorabilia-related forgeries. This operation was related to the earlier Operation Foulball in San Diego, but covered nationwide crimes. The FBI became aware of the scale of the forgery after following up a tip by Tony Gwynn. Gwynn noticed a sloppy forgery at a team store in Encinitas and alerted both Padres team management and MLB security. From there, it grew into a national investigation of forged memorabilia.

During the investigation, it was discovered that 75 percent of autographs purported to be from MLB players and other personnel were fake. Among these forgeries were supposed autographs by Mickey Mantle, as well as a baseball with a forged signature from the Catholic saint Mother Teresa. Even official team stores sometimes unknowingly stocked fake merchandise. Operation Bullpen began in the 1990s and focused on basketball before expanding to all sports, including baseball. Gwynn and other ballplayers like Mark McGwire assisted with the investigation by helping to authenticate items and confirm forgeries of their own signatures.

Stage 2 of Operation Bullpen began in 2002 and included forgeries which were sold online. During the investigation the FBI seized large amounts of sports gear with forged signatures, and defaced the signatures to prevent them from fooling members of the public. They then donated the baseballs and bats to local youth baseball leagues, as part of Phase III.

=== Later incidents ===
The organization has continued to have a long-running issue with counterfeiting in general, which peaks during the postseason. For example, during the 2011 National League Championship Series between the St Louis Cardinals and the Milwaukee Brewers, MLB officials confiscated over 5,000 counterfeited items, with more than 80 percent being found in the vicinity of Busch Stadium. The largest haul is during the World Series, when thousands of knock-off jerseys, caps, bags, and other items of merchandise are seized.

During the San Francisco Giants’ 2014 World Series race, United States Immigration and Customs Enforcement agents seized over 2,700 pieces of counterfeit MLB merchandise in the San Francisco Bay Area.

== Program description ==
The authentication system centers on a hologram sticker by OpSec, which carries its own individual alphanumeric code. The sticker is tamper-resistant: the embedded hologram is ruined if the sticker is removed from the item.

MLB employs approximately 220 authenticators as of 2022, with several being appointed to each team. At least two MLB authenticators are present at every MLB game, as well as the World Baseball Classic and team-specific events. MLB postseason games will have three or more authenticators. The authenticators all have a background in law enforcement and are recommended to the role by their local police departments. The authenticator usually sits in the first base camera well. Every ball that is taken out of play, without leaving the ballpark, is handed to the authenticator, who enters information about that ball into a computer database—such as "the pitcher, batter, inning and the reason the ball came out of play"—and then affixes the hologram.

While anything that goes into the stands is generally considered outside their jurisdiction, if there is a batter's milestone occurring, the authenticators will often work with the umpires to mark up baseballs to ensure that even if the milestone ball is hit into the stands, it can be tracked and later authenticated.

== Items authenticated ==
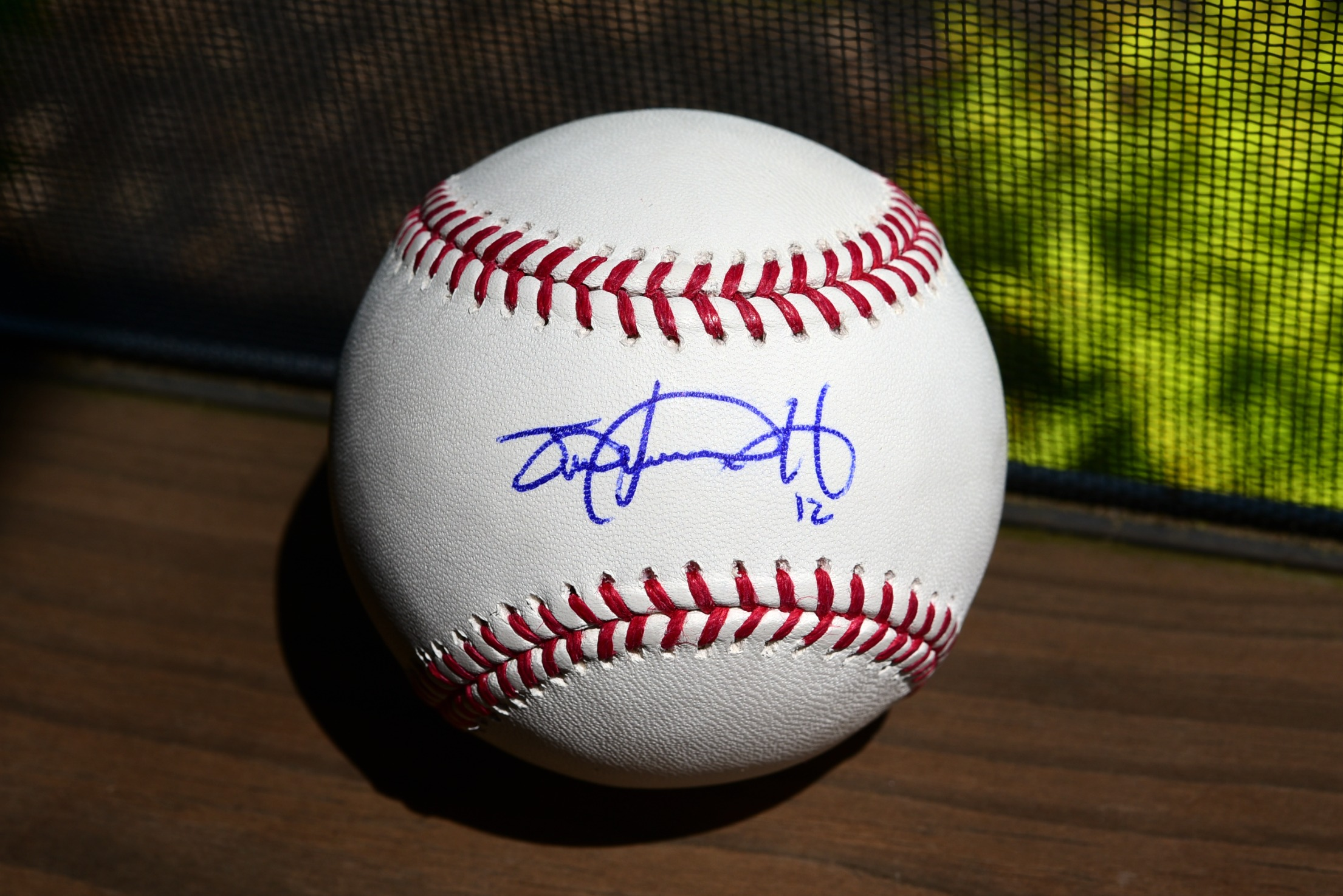
Baseball autographed by Juan Lagares

Usually the MLB Authentication Program authenticates items used during baseball games, with baseballs and baseball bats being the most common. Other game-used items which are authenticated include "player jerseys, locker tags, lineup cards, the pitching rubber, home plate, broken bats", and base pads. Any player can request that any item be authenticated, with the request usually being passed to the authenticators by the relevant clubhouse manager.

Any item with an MLB association can be authenticated. One example of this was when the Baltimore Orioles authenticated the remains of a dugout telephone that was smashed by the Boston Red Sox's David Ortiz. They then presented the phone to Ortiz during his retirement season. After the Houston Astros' Game 7 win in the 2017 World Series at Dodger Stadium, MLB authenticated jars of dirt taken from the field.

Between 500,000 and 600,000 items are authenticated each season. Game-used memorabilia remains the property of each team, which authenticates items for players who have reached certain milestones, for sale to fans at the team store or on the MLB online store, and for sale to retailers and other marketers of authenticated MLB merchandise. Occasionally items are sent for inclusion in the National Baseball Hall of Fame and Museum.

In 2001 MLB Properties contracted with the Arthur Andersen accounting firm to oversee and authenticate private autographing sessions for balls, bats, base pads, and other items. The Deloitte & Touche accounting firm took over this role in 2002.
