= Dennis Avoth =

Egyptian-born British boxer (1947–2023)

Personal information
- Nationality: British
- Born: Dennis Avoth; 25 October 1947 Egypt
- Died: 20 December 2023 (aged 76) Glamorgan, Wales
- Height: 5 ft 10 in (1.78 m)
- Weight: Heavyweight

Boxing career

Boxing record
- Total fights: 45
- Wins: 22
- Win by KO: 4
- Losses: 20
- Draws: 3
- No contests: 0

Dennis Jeffrey Avoth (25 October 1947 – 20 December 2023) was an Egyptian-born British heavyweight boxer. Avoth was a promising amateur boxer who turned professional in 1967. He held the Welsh Heavyweight Championship title from 1971 to 1973. He was the brother of Eddie Avoth, who was also a boxer and who became British, and Commonwealth Light-heavyweight champion, and European Light-heavyweight challenger. Dennis Avoth died in Glamorgan on 20 December 2023, at the age of 76.

== Boxing career ==
Avoth boxed out of the Victoria Park boxing club as a youth, and whilst still a teenager, he won the Welsh Amateur Boxing Association title, beating Del Phillips, who at 6 ft 5ins was seven inches taller than Avoth. The Welsh title allowed Avoth to enter the European championships, but was forced to retire after a torn rib ligament.

Avoth turned professional in 1967 and like Eddie Avoth, his older brother before him, he joined the stable of Merthyr based trainer, Eddie Thomas. Avoth's first professional bout was against London-based fighter Doyley Brown at Grosvenor House in Mayfair, an undercard to a Ken Buchanan match. Avoth stopped his opponent via technical knockout in the fifth of the six round fight. This was the first in a string of seven unbeaten fights, including a victory over Paul Brown at the National Sporting Club in January 1968. Despite this promising start, his allusions of following his brother as a major contender were broken by four straight loses.

Avoth was back to winning ways in the first half of 1969, remaining unbeaten in six fights, though all were through points decision. His run was broken in May when he faced future British heavyweight champion Bunny Johnson at the Midlands Sporting Club in Solihull. The eight round fight went the full distance, with the bout being awarded to Johnson. This was followed by a draw against his amateur title opponent Del Phillips, before Avoth again faced a future British heavyweight champion, Danny McAlinden. The fight against McAlinden was part of a national heavyweight competition held in Mayfair, London for a prize of £1,000. The eight-man knockout contest was scheduled for three rounds per bout and Avoth faced Manchester-based fighter Obe Hepburn in the quarter-finals. After beating Hepburn on points, he then beat Billy Wynter by the same decision in the semi-final. The other semi-final was between McAlinden and another future champion, Richard Dunn. McAlinden knocked out Dunn in the first round, and then managed to stop Avoth in the final again in the first round, but this time via technical knockout. Avoth fought once more in 1969, a loss to Central Area champion, Billy Aird, before readjusting his sights on a new challenge, the Welsh heavyweight title, held by North Walian Carl Gizzi.

1970 began with mixed results for Avoth. He lost to Charlie White, a fighter he had faced four times previously as a professional, before he recorded a win over Terry Feeley at the National Sporting Club. He then lost to Cliff Field before a Wales heavyweight title eliminator with Del Phillips was arranged. The fight was arranged as the top billing at Swansea's Top Rank Suite on 22 June 1970. The night started poorly for the Avoth family when younger brother Leslie was beaten by Santos Martins on the undercard, and Avoth's ambitions to become Welsh heavyweight champion were dented after Phillips was given the decision by referee Adrian Morgan after the match went the full ten rounds. Avoth finished 1970 with another two losses; to Peter Boddington in London and then to Bunny Johnson in Aberavon, both on points decision.

In 1971, and now managed by his father Jack, Avoth got his shot at the Welsh heavyweight title, which was still held by Carl Gizzi and had now been undefended in the six years since Gizzi won the title. The title fight was taken out of Wales and was staged at the National Sporting Club in London. The fight went the full ten rounds and Avoth was given the decision, making him the new Wales heavyweight champion. 1971 ended with two more wins, over Guinea Roger and Brian Jewitt; but 1972 began with two loses, which included the first time he had ever lost a professional fight by knockout when Roger Tighe stopped him in the sixth round of an eight-round contest. In April 1972, Avoth defended his Welsh title for the first time when he again faced Del Phillips. The two met in Swansea and again the fight went the distance, but this time referee Adrian Morgan gave the fight to Avoth. Avoth defended his title just once more when he beat Gene Innocent in Swansea in June 1973. Avoth was to fight just once more, a home bout in Sophia Gardens Pavilion in his home town of Cardiff. His challenger, Phil Matthew, knocked Avoth out in the first round, and Avoth retired from the sport soon after.

== Professional boxing record ==
22 Wins (4 knockouts, 18 decisions), 20 Losses (6 knockouts, 14 decisions), 3 Draws Archived 27 April 2015 at the Wayback Machine
Result	Record	Opponent	Type	Round	Date	Location	Notes
Loss	13–4	(United Kingdom) Phil Matthews	KO	1	1 August 1973	Sophia Gardens Pavilion, Cardiff, United Kingdom	Avoth knocked out at 2:29 of the first round.
Win	10–3–1	(United Kingdom) Gene Innocent	PTS	10	27 June 1973	Top Rank Suite, Swansea, United Kingdom	BBBofC Welsh Heavyweight Title.
Loss	9–1	(United Kingdom) Eddie Neilson	PTS	8	30 April 1973	National Sporting Club, Piccadilly, London, United Kingdom	
Loss	5–0	(United Kingdom) Tim "Fire" Wood	PTS	8	19 April 1973	Wolverhampton Civic Hall, Wolverhampton, United Kingdom	39.25–39.5
Win	10–20–1	(Saint Helena) Guinea Roger	PTS	8	5 February 1973	Top Rank Suite, Swansea, United Kingdom	39.25–39.
Loss	6–0	(United Kingdom) Eddie Nielson	PTS	8	27 November 1972	National Sporting Club, Piccadilly, London, United Kingdom	
Loss	6–0	(United Kingdom) Frank "The Tank" Carpenter	PTS	8	24 October 1972	Bull Ring Sporting Club, Birmingham, United Kingdom	38.25–40.
Loss	5–0	(United Kingdom) Frank "The Tank" Carpenter	PTS	8	27 June 1972	Villa Park, Birmingham, United Kingdom	
Win	13–5–1	(United Kingdom) Del Phillips	PTS	10	24 April 1972	Swansea Cwmfelin, Swansea, United Kingdom	BBBofC Welsh Heavyweight Title.
Loss	6–0	(United Kingdom) Les "Is More" Stevens	TKO	6	27 March 1972	Top Rank Suite, Reading, United Kingdom	
Loss	20–6–3	(United Kingdom) Roger Tighe	KO	6	14 February 1972	National Sporting Club, Piccadilly, London, United Kingdom	
Win	9–7–2	(United Kingdom) Brian Jewitt	PTS	8	29 November 1971	West of England Sporting Club, Bristol, United Kingdom	
Win	8–18–1	(Saint Helena) Guinea Roger	TKO	5	9 November 1971	Wolverhampton, United Kingdom	
Win	31–11	(United Kingdom) Carl Gizzi	PTS	10	11 October 1971	Cafe Royal, Piccadilly, London, United Kingdom	BBBofC Welsh Heavyweight Title.
Win	22–5	(Jamaica) Bunny Johnson	PTS	8	22 September 1971	Midlands Sporting Club, Solihull, United Kingdom	
Win	9–8–2	(United Kingdom) Brian "City" Hall	PTS	6	5 July 1971	Grosvenor House, Mayfair, London, United Kingdom	
Loss	18–4	(Jamaica) Bunny Johnson	PTS	10	19 October 1970	Aberavon, United Kingdom	
Loss	13–1	(United Kingdom) Peter Boddington	PTS	8	8 September 1970	Empire Pool, Wembley, London, United Kingdom	
Loss	8–4–1	(United Kingdom) Del Phillips	PTS	10	22 June 1970	Swansea, United Kingdom	BBBofC Welsh Heavyweight Title Eliminator
Loss	6–0	(United Kingdom) Cliff Field	TKO	7	9 March 1970	Centre Hotel, Bloomsbury, London, United Kingdom	
Win	9–5	(United Kingdom) Terry Feeley	TKO	4	10 February 1970	National Sporting Club, Piccadilly, London, United Kingdom	
Loss	6–7	(United Kingdom) Charlie "Wizzer" White	PTS	8	12 January 1970	Mayfair Sporting Club, Mayfair, London, United Kingdom	
Loss	3–0	(United Kingdom) Billy Aird	PTS	6	29 September 1969	National Sporting Club, Piccadilly, London, United Kingdom	
Loss	--	(United Kingdom) Danny McAlinden	TKO	1	7 July 1969	Mayfair, London, United Kingdom	
Win	10–21–2	(Antigua and Barbuda) Billy Wynter	PTS	3	7 July 1969	Mayfair, London, United Kingdom	
Win	7–11–2	(United Kingdom) Obe Hepburn	PTS	3	7 July 1969	Mayfair, London, United Kingdom	
Draw	7–0	(United Kingdom) Del Phillips	PTS	8	2 July 1969	Cardiff, United Kingdom	
Loss	12–2	(Jamaica) Bunny Johnson	PTS	8	7 May 1969	Midlands Sporting Club, Solihull, United Kingdom	
Win	1–1	(United Kingdom) Jack Cotes	PTS	6	28 April 1969	Grosvenor House, Mayfair, London, United Kingdom	
Win	5–12–3	(United Kingdom) George Dulaire	PTS	6	24 March 1969	National Sporting Club, Mayfair, London, United Kingdom	
Win	1–0	(United Kingdom) Jack Cotes	PTS	6	10 March 1969	Colston Hall, Bristol, United Kingdom	
Draw	6–10–1	(United Kingdom) Obe Hepburn	PTS	8	24 February 1969	National Sporting Club, Piccadilly, London, United Kingdom	
Win	5–11–3	(United Kingdom) George Dulaire	PTS	8	3 February 1969	Cafe Royal, Piccadilly, London, United Kingdom	
Win	4–4	(United Kingdom) Charlie "Wizzer" White	PTS	8	23 January 1969	Dunstable, United Kingdom	
Loss	3–4	(United Kingdom) Charlie "Wizzer" White	PTS	6	27 November 1968	Sophia Gardens Cricket Ground, Cardiff, United Kingdom	29.5–29.75.
Loss	8–6–1	(United Kingdom) "Crown" Vic Moore	TKO	7	12 May 1968	Grosvenor House, Mayfair, London, United Kingdom	
Loss	10–2	(United Kingdom) Terry Daly	PTS	6	9 April 1968	Empire Pool, Wembley, London, United Kingdom	28.75–30.
Loss	2–2	(United Kingdom) Charlie "Wizzer" White	PTS	8	27 February 1968	Drill Hall, Northampton, United Kingdom	39–39.5.
Win	3–2	(United Kingdom) Terry Feeley	PTS	6	12 February 1968	Grosvenor House, Mayfair, London, United Kingdom	29.75–29.5.
Win	2–3	(United Kingdom) Paul "Cleveland" Brown	PTS	8	22 January 1968	National Sporting Club, Piccadilly, London, United Kingdom	39.75–39.
Win	2–1	(United Kingdom) Charlie "Wizzer" White	PTS	6	11 December 1967	Raynors Sporting Club, Leicester, United Kingdom	29.75–29.25.
Win	0–2–1	(United Kingdom) "Boxing" Bert Johnson	PTS	6	28 November 1967	Afan Lido, Aberavon, United Kingdom	
Win	1–1	(United Kingdom) Paul "Cleveland" Brown	TKO	5	22 October 1967	Hotel Metropole Sporting Club, Brighton, United Kingdom	
Win	3–12–3	(United Kingdom) Barry Rodney	PTS	6	9 October 1967	Raynors Sporting Club, Leicester, United Kingdom	
Win	3–4	(United Kingdom) Doyley Brown	TKO	5	14 September 1967	Grosvenor House, Mayfair, London, United Kingdom	

== Bibliography ==
- Jones, Gareth (2009). The Boxers of Wales: Cardiff. Cardiff: St David's Press. ISBN 978-1-902719-26-9.
