= Joe Smyth =

British boxer

Personal information
- Nationality: British
- Born: 5 June 1985 (age 41)
- Weight: Light Heavyweight

Boxing career
- Stance: Orthodox

Boxing record
- Total fights: 8
- Wins: 7
- Win by KO: 4
- Losses: 1
- Draws: 0

Joe Smyth is a British Professional boxer who competes in the Light Heavyweight division.

As an amateur Smyth was in the English team alongside other well-known boxers such as Amir Khan, James DeGale, Frankie Gavin, Steven Smith and Tony Jeffries.

Smyth turned pro in 2008 and in December 2010 it was announced that Smyth would be taking part in the Lightheavy Weights prizefighter competition at York Hall, Bethnal Green on 29 January 2011.

Alongside stablemate Eder Kurti, Joe Smyth is trained by Paul Reese at the Monster Gym in Cheshunt and is managed by Michael Helliet Management.

== See also ==
- Mayfair Sporting Club
- Michael Helliet Management
- Prizefighter series
