= Michael Helliet Management =

- Industry: Professional Boxing
- Founded: 2002 (United Kingdom)
- Headquarters: London
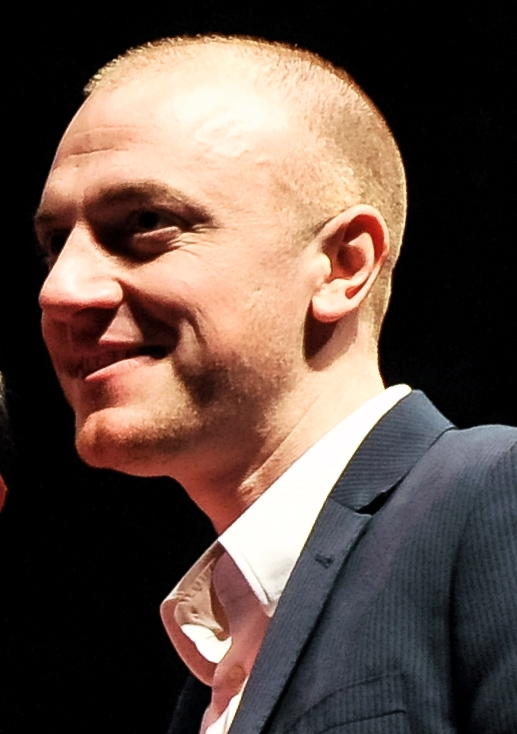
- Key people: Michael Helliet
- Products: Professional boxing management
- Website: Michael Helliet Management (MHM)

Michael Helliet Management is a London based agency that provides professional boxing management, and currently represents over 40 professional boxers including heavyweight Danny Williams and the undefeated English Champion Ashley Sexton. Michael Helliet Management currently manages more boxers than any other agency within the UK.

== Overview ==
The agency was established by manager, matchmaker, promoter and managing director of the Mayfair Sporting Club, Michael Helliet.

Undefeated flyweight, Ashley Sexton, who has been managed by Michael Helliet Management since turning professional in 2008, won the English flyweight title in January 2010 after knocking out Usman Ahmed in the first round. Later in 2010, after only nine professional fights, Sexton challenged Shinny Bayaar for the British title, but the fight was scored a draw.

In 2010, undefeated lightweight prospect Tony Owen from Carshalton, signed a new three year management contract with Michael Helliet management. As a southpaw with a professional record of eight wins in as many starts, he is an anticipated fighter.

In December 2010, it was announced that former England amateur team member Joe Smyth, would be taking part in the light heavyweight prizefighter competition at York Hall in Bethnal Green on 29 January 2011.

== See also ==
- Mayfair Sporting Club
- Joe Smyth
- Tony Owen
