= Danny McAlinden =

Northern Irish boxer (1947–2021)

Personal information
- Nationality: British (Northern Irish)
- Born: 1 June 1947 Newry, Northern Ireland
- Died: 8 March 2021 (aged 73)

Sport
- Sport: Boxing
- Event: Heavyweight
- Club: Edgewick Trades Hall ABC
Medal record
Representing Northern Ireland
British Empire and Commonwealth Games
Bronze medal – third place	1966 Kingston	heavyweight

Daniel McAlinden (1 June 1947 – 8 March 2021) was a boxer from Northern Ireland, who represented Northern Ireland at the British Empire and Commonwealth Games (now Commonwealth Games).

== Biography ==
McAlinden was born in Newry and, at the age of 15, moved to Coventry.

McAlinden represented the 1966 Northern Irish Team at the 1966 British Empire and Commonwealth Games in Kingston, Jamaica, participating in the heavyweight category and won a bronze medal.

In 1967, he fought at the European Championship in Rome.

He turned professional in 1969 and, in his second fight, stopped future British champion Richard Dunn. On the program of the Joe Frazier versus Muhammad Ali I bout on 8 March 1971 at Madison Square Garden in New York, New York, McAlinden outpointed Ali's brother, Rahaman, undefeated in seven fights, after six rounds in a contest for rising boxers. McAlinden was at one time considered a potential opponent for world champion George Foreman's first title defence. He won the British and Commonwealth heavyweight championship in 1972, when he defeated Jack Bodell in two rounds at Aston Villa football ground. Nicknamed "Dangerous Dan", he was managed by George Middleton who had managed Randolph Turpin when he was world middleweight champion in 1951.

However, in 1973 his form dipped and he eventually lost his title in 1975 to Bunny Johnson in nine rounds. He attempted to win back the title in 1975 against champion Richard Dunn but lost in round two. He fought on until 1981. In total he had 45 fights with a 31–12–2 record, winning 28 by knockout.

In 2010 it was reported that McAlinden was suffering from cancer of the tongue.

== Professional boxing record ==
31 Wins (28 knockouts, 3 decisions), 12 Losses (8 knockouts, 4 decisions), 2 Draws Archived 25 April 2014 at the Wayback Machine
Result	Record	Opponent	Type	Round	Date	Location	Notes
Loss	8–8	(United Kingdom) Denton Ruddock	TKO	5	30 March 1981	Aston Villa Leisure Centre, Birmingham	Referee stopped the bout at 1:57 of the fifth round.
Loss	20–21–8	(United Kingdom) Tony Moore	PTS	8	14 December 1980	Burlington Hotel, Dublin	
Win	10–21–6	(United Kingdom) David Fry	TKO	6	22 September 1980	Maysfield Leisure Centre, Belfast	
Loss	9–3–3	(United Kingdom) George Scott	PTS	8	20 November 1979	Maysfield Leisure Centre, Belfast	
Loss	12–3	(United Kingdom) Tommy Kiely	TKO	6	22 May 1978	Grosvenor House, Mayfair, London	
Loss	8–1	(United Kingdom) Neil Malpass	TKO	3	19 September 1977	Grosvenor House, Mayfair, London	
Win	1–2	(Northern Ireland) Sean McKenna	TKO	2	26 July 1977	Templemore Sports Complex, Derry	BBBofC Northern Ireland Heavyweight Title.
Win	12–2	(United Kingdom) Terry O'Connor	TKO	1	7 April 1977	Dudley Town Hall, Dudley	
Loss	13–6–2	(United Kingdom) Tony Moore	TKO	4	30 November 1976	Dudley Civic Hall, Dudley	
Win	16–9–1	(United Kingdom) Eddie Fenton	TKO	4	14 July 1976	Wolverhampton	
Loss	30–9	(United Kingdom) Richard Dunn	KO	2	4 November 1975	Empire Pool, London	BBBofC British/Commonwealth Heavyweight Titles.
Win	6–6	(United States) Rodell Dupree	KO	3	14 October 1975	Royal Albert Hall, London	
Win	11–2–1	(Germany) Hartmut Sasse	KO	5	3 June 1975	Royal Albert Hall, London	
Win	--	(United States) Richie Yates	KO	3	29 April 1975	Royal Albert Hall, London	
Loss	38–6	(Jamaica) Bunny Johnson	KO	9	13 January 1975	Grosvenor House, Mayfair, London	BBBofC British/Commonwealth Heavyweight Titles.
Loss	29–5–1	(United States) Pat Duncan	PTS	10	15 January 1974	Royal Albert Hall, London	
Win	14–12	(United States) Vernon McIntosh	KO	4	11 December 1973	Royal Albert Hall, London	
Win	16–11	(United States) Tony Ventura	TKO	1	13 November 1973	Empire Pool, London	Referee stopped the bout at 1:45 of the first round.
Loss	13–3	(United States) Morris Jackson	TKO	3	14 May 1973	Grosvenor House, Mayfair, London	
Win	3–2	(United States) Willie Moore	KO	5	12 December 1972	Villa Park, Birmingham	
Win	58–12	(United Kingdom) Jack Bodell	KO	2	27 June 1972	Villa Park, Birmingham	BBBofC British/Commonwealth Heavyweight Titles. Bodell knocked out at 1:31 of the second round.
Loss	18–1–1	(United States) Larry Middleton	TKO	8	13 March 1972	King's Hall, Manchester	
Win	12–1	(United States) Chuck Olivera	KO	7	9 December 1971	Wolverhampton Civic Hall, Wolverhampton	
Win	10–11	(United States) Dick Gosha	TKO	9	8 November 1971	Mayfair, London	
Win	30–8–3	(Canada) Bill Drover	KO	4	13 September 1971	Mayfair, London	
Win	22–23	(Peru) Roberto Davila	TKO	5	9 June 1971	Cliffs Pavilion, Southend	
Win	31–9	(Wales) Carl Gizzi	PTS	10	28 April 1971	Solihull Civic Hall, Solihull	
Win	7–0	(United States) Rahaman Ali	PTS	6	8 March 1971	Madison Square Garden, New York City	
Draw	10–5–2	(United States) Tommy Hicks	PTS	10	24 February 1971	Mayfair Sporting Club, Mayfair, London	
Win	15–31–5	(United States) Lou Bailey	PTS	8	19 January 1971	Ulster Hall, Belfast	
Draw	23–10–4	(United States) Ray Patterson	PTS	10	3 December 1970	Wolverhampton Civic Hall, Wolverhampton	
Win	9–4–2	(United States) Tommy Hicks	TKO	7	12 November 1970	Southend	
Win	13–11–4	(United States) Moses Harrell	TKO	1	12 October 1970	Mayfair Sporting Club, Mayfair, London	
Loss	18–8–2	(United States) Jack O'Halloran	PTS	8	6 July 1970	Mayfair Sporting Club, Mayfair, London,	
Win	2–5	(United States) JD McCauley	KO	1	19 May 1970	Cliffs Pavilion, Southend	
Win	4–2–2	(Jamaica) Edmund Stewart	TKO	2	27 April 1970	Mayfair, London,	
Win	7–3	(United States) Sylvester Dullaire	KO	4	17 March 1970	Wolverhampton	
Win	12–24–3	(Antigua and Barbuda) Billy Wynter	TKO	3	5 March 1970	Cliffs Pavilion, Southend	
Win	6–8–2	(United States) Tommy Clark	TKO	5	23 February 1970	Grosvenor House, Mayfair, London,	
Win	6–13–6	(Martinique) Henri Ferjules	KO	2	12 January 1970	Mayfair Sporting Club, Mayfair, London,	
Win	10–3–1	(United States) Phil Smith	TKO	3	17 November 1969	Great International Sporting Club, Nottingham	
Win	7–12–2	(United States) Obe Hepburn	TKO	4	15 September 1969	Mayfair Sporting Club, Mayfair, London	
Win	11–5–3	(Wales) Dennis Avoth	TKO	1	7 July 1969	Mayfair, London	
Win	2–1	(United Kingdom) John Cullen	TKO	2	7 July 1969	Mayfair, London	
Win	--	(United Kingdom) Richard Dunn	KO	1	7 July 1969	Mayfair, London	
