= Ernie Field =

English professional boxer & rugby league footballer

Ernest Field

Personal information
- Nicknames: Ernie, 'Cloise (Yorkshire dialect pronunciation of 'Close', the Old English word for 'Field')
- Nationality: British
- Born: Ernest Field; 6 February 1943 Wakefield, England
- Died: 2 May 2013 (aged 70) Wakefield, England
- Weight: middle/light heavy/cruiserweight

Boxing career
- Stance: initially Orthodox, then Southpaw

Boxing record
- Total fights: 19
- Wins: 6
- Win by KO: 5
- Losses: 12
- Draws: 1
- No contests: 0

Ernest "Ernie" Field (6 February 1943 – 2 May 2013) was an English Amateur Boxing Association of England amateur middleweight and professional light heavy/cruiserweight boxer and rugby league footballer who played in the 1960s. He played at club level for Stanley Rangers ARLFC, Wakefield Trinity (A-Team) and Bramley, as a centre, or loose forward.

== Background ==
Ernie Field was born in Wakefield, West Riding of Yorkshire, England, he initially lived at Bottomboat, near Stanley, later moving to Outwood, and he studied at Stanley Secondary Modern. He died at Snapethorpe Hall Care Home, Wakefield from throat cancer (Oropharyngeal cancer) having developed Dementia. Outside boxing he worked initially as a Motor mechanic, then as a Fitter for the National Coal Board at Lofthouse Colliery (Wakefield), Bouncer, Paviour (Paver), and general construction worker.

== Boxing career ==
=== Amateur ===
Ernie Field trained at the Robin Hood & Thorpe Amateur Boxing Club (ABC), he was the National Coal Board British Middleweight Champion, he fought internationally for the Amateur Boxing Association of England; including against Hungary with a points victory over Hungarian amateur middleweight (75 kg (165.3 lb; 11 st 11.3 lb)) champion Tibor Borda (born circa-1939), of Bonyhádi Spartacus, at King's Hall, Belle Vue, Manchester on Monday 11 November 1963, and fought overseas; including a tournament in Castrop-Rauxel, West Germany.

=== Professional ===
Ernie Field's professional fighting weight varied from 173 lb (78.5 kg; 12 st 5 lb), i.e. Light heavyweight to 189 lb (85.7 kg; 13 st 7 lb), i.e. Cruiserweight, managed by Tommy Miller, Ernie Field's first professional boxing bout took place against Louis Samuels on Monday 7 March 1966, he built-up an initial record of six wins (4 knockouts), five defeats by points, and one draw by March 1967, including; a points victory over Tony Moore on the undercard of the Muhammad Ali versus Henry Cooper bout for the Heavyweight Championship of the World in front of a crowd of 46,000 at Arsenal Stadium, Highbury on Saturday 21 May 1966, and a second-round technical knockout of future British and British Commonwealth light-heavyweight Champion Eddie Avoth at Wyvern Sporting Club (Midland Hotel), Manchester on Monday 30 January 1967, despite initially being a Middleweight, he began to be matched against Heavyweights, e.g. Rocky Campbell and Peter Boddington, and this resulted in a downturn in his career, losing his last seven bouts, with five by points decisions, of which four were by narrow margins, including a bout outside of the United Kingdom, against South African light-heavyweight Champion Jan Happy Pieterse at Johannesburg City Hall Johannesburg, South Africa on Monday 18 March 1968, his final professional bout took place against Gene Innocent on Monday 13 May 1968. Ernie Field was scheduled to compete with Ray Ako for the vacant Central (England) Area light heavyweight title at Liverpool Stadium, Liverpool on Tuesday 17 September 1968, however Ernie Field was forced to withdraw before the bout, and was replaced by Shaun Dolan, Ray Ako beat Shaun Dolan with a third-round knockout.

== Amateur boxing record (incomplete) ==
x Wins (x knockouts, x decisions), x Losses (x knockouts, x decisions)
Result	Record	Opponent	Type	Round	Date	Location	Notes
Win	unknown	(Hungary) Tibor Borda	PTS	3	11 November 1963	King's Hall, Belle Vue, Manchester, Lancashire	(Hungarian amateur middleweight (75 kg (165.3 lb; 11 st 11.3 lb)) champion)

== Professional boxing record ==
6 Wins (4 knockouts, 2 decisions), 12 Losses (1 knockouts, 11 decisions)
Result	Record	Opponent	Weight Class	Type	Round	Date	Location	Notes
Loss	8–0–0	(Wales) Gene Innocent	Cruiserweight	RTD	2 of 8	13 May 1968	King's Hall, Belle Vue, Manchester, Lancashire	(future Welsh Area heavyweight Challenger)
Loss	6–0–0	(England) Peter Boddington	Heavyweight	TKO	7 of 8	9 April 1968	(England) Empire Pool, Wembley, London	Referee stopped the bout at 2:42 of the 7th round. (1967 ABA of England heavyweight Champion)
Loss	12–3–0	(South Africa) Jan Happy Pieterse	Cruiserweight	PTS	10	18 March 1968	Johannesburg City Hall, Johannesburg, Gauteng, South Africa	(South African light-heavyweight Champion)
Loss	7–0–0	(England) Des Cox	Cruiserweight	PTS	8	13 February 1968	(England) East India Hall, Poplar, London	39–39¼ (Des Cox down in 7th round for a count of seven.)
Loss	11–7–0	(Antigua and Barbuda) Rocky Campbell	Heavyweight	PTS	8	15 January 1968	Raynors Sporting Club (Grand Hotel), Leicester, Leicestershire	38–39¾ (future Midlands Area heavyweight Champion)
Loss	11–9–3	(Saint Kitts and Nevis) Johnny Hendrickson	Cruiserweight	PTS	8	7 May 1967	(England) World Sporting Club (Grosvenor House Hotel), Mayfair, London	38¾–39¾ (1962 ABA of England Light-heavyweight champion)
Loss	19–6–1	(Fiji) Leweni Waqa	Cruiserweight	PTS	10	27 April 1967	Colston Hall, Bristol, Somerset	47¾–50 (future Fijian heavyweight Champion, and South Seas heavyweight Challenger)
Win	5–7–2	(Jamaica) Charlie Wilson	Cruiserweight	PTS	8	29 March 1967	Manor Suite, Porthcawl, Wales	
Draw	12–10–1	(Jamaica) Lloyd Walford	Cruiserweight	PTS	8	7 March 1967	Free Trade Hall, Manchester, Lancashire	39½–39½ (future Central Area light-heavyweight Champion)
Win	29–2–0	(Wales) Eddie Avoth	Cruiserweight	TKO	2 of 8	30 January 1967	Wyvern Sporting Club (Midland Hotel), Manchester, Lancashire	(future British, and British Commonwealth light-heavyweight Champion, and (EBU) European light-heavyweight Challenger). Eddie Avoth weighed 12 st 6 lb (174 lb; 78.9 kg), and Ernie Field weighed 12 st 11 lb (179 lb; 81.2 kg)
Loss	6–1–0	(Republic of Ireland) Dave Barber	Cruiserweight	PTS	8	29 November 1966	Leeds Town Hall, Leeds, Yorkshire	39–39½ (former Irish ABA representative)
Loss	7–0–0	(England) Jimmy Tibbs	Cruiserweight	PTS	8	25 October 1966	(England) Royal Albert Hall, Kensington, London	38¼–40
Win	2–8–0	(Australia) Vernon Allen	Light heavyweight	KO	6 of 8	10 October 1966	Free Trade Hall, Manchester, Lancashire	(future New South Wales (Australia) heavyweight challenger)
Loss	26–2–0	(Wales) Eddie Avoth	Light heavyweight	PTS	8	19 September 1966	Wyvern Sporting Club (Midland Hotel), Manchester, Lancashire	(future British, and British Commonwealth light-heavyweight Champion, and (EBU) European light-heavyweight Challenger). Ernie Field weighed 12 st 9 lb (177 lb; 80.3 kg)
Loss	5–1–0	(Republic of Ireland) Dave Barber	Light heavyweight	PTS	6	6 September 1966	(England) Empire Pool, Wembley, London	(former Irish ABA representative)
Win	6–1–1	(England) Tony Moore	Light heavyweight	PTS	6	21 May 1966	(England) Arsenal Stadium, Highbury, London	
Loss	1–2–0	(Scotland) Tom Calderwood	Light heavyweight	PTS	6	25 April 1966	New St James Hall, Newcastle upon Tyne, Northumberland	
Win	1–1–0	(Scotland) Tom Calderwood	Light heavyweight	TKO	5 of 6	22 March 1966	Tower Circus, Blackpool, Lancashire	
Win	3–4–1	(Nigeria) Louis Samuels	Light heavyweight	TKO	4 of 6	7 March 1966	Sheffield City Hall, Sheffield, West Riding of Yorkshire	

== Genealogical information ==
Ernie Field was the son of Harry Field, and Florence 'Flo'/'Florrie' "Queenie" (née Smith), and the older brother of Richard Field, and Douglas Edward "Tiny" Field.

== Funeral ==
Ernie Field's funeral took place at Wakefield Crematorium, Crigglestone at 1pm on Monday 20 May 2013, and was attended by family and friends, including; rugby league footballers Dave Sampson (who read the eulogy), Dean Sampson, Avis Sampson (wife of Malcolm Sampson), and Melvin Castle (husband of Denise Castle), and boxers Alan Richardson, Keith Tate, Steve Butler, and White Rose Boxing Club trainer John Hall, the funeral's entrance music was The Beatles' In My Life, and the exit music was Glen Campbell's version of Green Day's Good Riddance (Time of Your Life).
