= Listed buildings in Bradford (Wibsey Ward) =

Wibsey is a ward in the metropolitan borough of the City of Bradford, West Yorkshire, England. It contains 69 listed buildings that are recorded in the National Heritage List for England. Of these, one is listed at Grade II*, the middle of the three grades, and the others are at Grade II, the lowest grade. The ward is to the south of the centre of Bradford, it is almost completely residential, and most of the listed buildings are cottages and houses. The other listed buildings include churches, public houses, schools, and a former sports centre.

== Key ==
Grade	Criteria
II*	Particularly important buildings of more than special interest
II	Buildings of national importance and special interest

== Buildings ==
Name and location	Photograph	Date	Notes	Grade
116, 118 and 120 High Street; 53.76737°N 1.77134°W	—	1626	A house later divided, it is in gritstone, with quoins, and a stone slate roof with saddlestones and shaped kneelers. There are two storeys, the ground floor contains shop fronts, a side door has a deep initialled and dated lintel, and the windows are mullioned, with some mullions removed.	II
7–10 Chapel Fold; 53.76894°N 1.77811°W	—	c. 1635	A group of buildings, of which No. 9 was originally a chapel, and No. 10 its vestry; they were converted for domestic use in the early 19th century. The buildings are in gritstone, with quoins, and stone slate roofs with gables, saddlestones and carved kneelers. There are two storeys, the doorways have chamfered surrounds and massive lintels, and some of the windows are mullioned and transomed with hood moulds in the ground floor.	II*
11–14 Chapel Fold; 53.76878°N 1.77800°W	—	c. 1635	A row of cottages that were altered in the early 19th century, they are in gritstone with stone slate roofs. The cottage at the west end has two storeys, and the others have one. The doorways have plain surrounds, some windows are mullioned, some mullions have been removed, and some windows have hood moulds.	II
169, 171 and 173 High Street; 53.76682°N 1.77372°W	—	17th century	A house later divided, it is in gritstone and sandstone, with quoins and a stone slate roof. There are two storeys, the windows either have a single light, or are mullioned, and garage doors have been inserted.	II
48–56 Chapel Street; 53.76775°N 1.77131°W	—	Late 17th century	A row of three cottages of different builds, in sandstone, with quoins, a string course, and a stone slate roof with saddlestones and shaped kneelers. There are two storeys, the windows are mullioned and some have been altered. The doorway of No. 50 has a moulded surround, that of No. 52 has moulded jambs, and all have lintels inscribed with different initials and dates.	II
1, 2 and 3 Chapel Fold; 53.76892°N 1.77905°W	—	Late 17th or early 18th century	A row of three cottages with slate stone roofs. The earliest is No. 3, which is in gritstone with quoins and saddlestones. It has two storeys, and the windows have single lights, or are mullioned with two lights. Nos. 1 and 2 date from about 1840, they are in sandstone, there is a single storey, and they have plain door and window surrounds.	II
122 and 124 High Street; 53.76751°N 1.77134°W	—	17th or 18th century	A house, later used for other purposes, it is in painted rendered stone, and has a stone slate roof with a shaped kneeler on the south gable end. In the ground floor are modern shop fronts, and the upper floor has windows with the mullions removed.	II
The White Swan Public House; 53.76702°N 1.77300°W		Late 17th or early 18th century	The rebuild of an earlier inn, it is in gritstone with quoins and a stone slate roof. There are two storeys, with the public house to the right. This part contains two canted bay windows. The doorways have square jambs, and the windows are mullioned.	II
3 and 5 Carr Bottom Fold; 53.76979°N 1.76622°W	—	Mid 18th century (or earlier)	A farmhouse, later two cottages, the building is in gritstone with blocks of ironstone, quoins, and a stone slate roof with shaped kneelers and splayed capping carved up as a saddlestone. There are two storeys, the windows in No. 5 are mullioned with three lights, and those in No. 3 are modern replacements.	II
3–21 Briggs Place; 53.76947°N 1.78241°W	—	Mid to late 18th century	Probably originally a farmhouse that was later converted into back to back houses. The building is in sandstone with quoins, and a stone slate roof with saddlestones and shaped kneelers. There are two storeys, the doorways have squared jambs, some windows are mullioned, and others have been altered.	II
55–63 North Road; 53.76749°N 1.77727°W	—	Late 18th century	A row of cottages, later extended, in sandstone with quoins, and stone slate roofs. No. 55 has one storey, the other cottages have two, and there are rear outshuts. The doorways have squared jambs, above the doorways are single-light windows, the other windows are mullioned with two lights, and there are two small dormers.	II
66, 68 and 86 Pothouse Road; 53.76317°N 1.77518°W	—	Late 18th century	A group of houses, partly back to back, in gritstone, with quoins and stone slate roofs. There are two storeys at the east end, and one at the west end, where there are double gable ends. The windows are mullioned with two or four lights, and No. 66 has a projecting gabled porch.	II
6 and 8 Holroyd Hill; 53.76689°N 1.76609°W	—	1783	A pair of sandstone houses in a row, with quoins, a plat band, block eaves brackets, and a stone slate roof. There are two storeys, the openings have squared surrounds, and between the houses in the upper floor is an inscribed and dated panel with a shaped head.	II
46 Holroyd Hill; 53.76695°N 1.76777°W	—	c. 1800	A cottage with attached workshop, it is in sandstone, and has a stone slate roof with saddlestones. The doorway has squared jambs, to the left is a window, and to the right is a workshop door with a window above.	II
1–6 Tordoff Green; 53.76509°N 1.77758°W	—	c. 1800	A group of cottages in an L-shaped plan, with No. 6 added in about 1840. They are in sandstone and gritstone, some with a sill band, and stone slate roofs. There are two storeys, the doorways have squared jambs, and the windows either have a single light, or are mullioned with two lights.	II
10, 12 and 14 Upper George Street; 53.76695°N 1.77566°W	—	c. 1800	A row of single-storey cottages in roughcast sandstone with a stone slate roof. The doorways have squared jambs, and the windows are mullioned with two lights.	II
Dog and Gun public house 53.76986°N 1.77994°W		c. 1800	The public house is in sandstone, it has a stone slate roof with saddlestones, and a large shaped kneeler on the west gable end. There are two storeys and four bays, the ground floor of the left bay and the right bay projecting, and in the angle of the right bay is a porch. The outer bays contain single-light windows, in the middle two bays are three-light mullioned windows, at the rear is a seven-light mullioned window, and in the gable end is a casement window.	II
1–11 Holroyd Hill; 53.76662°N 1.76630°W	—	Late 18th and early 19th century	A row of sandstone cottages with stone slate roofs and two storeys. The doorways have squared jambs, some windows have single lights, some are mullioned, and some mullions have been removed.	II
Folly Hall House; 53.76446°N 1.77459°W	—	Late 18th or early 19th century	The house is in sandstone, with a hipped slate roof, and two storeys. On the north front is a porch with a grooved surround and a cornice, and above it is a round-headed stair window. To the left is a service wing with two-light mullioned windows, and to the right is a three-light window set in a former carriage archway. On the south front is a central doorway with pilasters, flanked by canted bay windows with pilasters.	II
1–7 Church Lane; 53.76371°N 1.78053°W	—	c. 1800–20	A row of single-storey cottages with stone slate roofs. The doorways have squared jambs, and the windows are mullioned with two lights.	II
2, 4, 6 and 8 Edge Nook; 53.76883°N 1.78378°W	—	c. 1800–20	Two pairs of single-storey cottages at right angles. They are in sandstone, and have stone slate roofs with saddlestones. The windows either have single lights, or are mullioned with two lights.	II
4 Holroyd Hill; 53.76683°N 1.76599°W	—	c. 1800–20	A sandstone cottage at the end of a row, with block brackets to the eaves, and a stone slate roof. There are two storeys, the doorway has squared jambs, the window above it has a single light, and the other windows are mullioned with two lights.	II
39 Warburton Place and outhouse 53.76656°N 1.76824°W	—	c. 1800–30	A cottage or small farmhouse with a later outbuilding or barn, they are in sandstone with stone slate roofs. There are two storeys, the doorway has squared jambs, and the windows either have a single light, or are mullioned with two lights.	II
White Lane Top; 53.76596°N 1.76382°W	—	1818	A pair of sandstone cottages at right angles to the road with stone slate roofs. There are two storeys, the doorways have squared jambs, and the windows either have a single light, or are mullioned with two or three lights.	II
10–18 Holroyd Hill; 53.76690°N 1.76638°W	—	c. 1820	A row of sandstone cottages with block brackets to the eaves, stone slate roofs, and two storeys. The doorways have squared jambs, the windows above the doorways have single lights, some of the other windows are mullioned, and some have inserted casement windows.	II
41–51 Holroyd Hill; 53.76672°N 1.76816°W	—	c. 1820	A row of sandstone cottages at right angles to the road, with sill bands, bracketed eaves, and stone slate roofs. There are two storeys, the doorways have squared jambs, the windows are mullioned with two lights, and a modern bow window has been inserted in No. 47.	II
26 and 28 Holroyd Hill; 53.76693°N 1.76697°W	—	c. 1820–30	A pair of sandstone cottages with a stone slate roof. They have one storey, the doorways have squared jambs, and the windows are mullioned with two lights.	II
32–44 Holroyd Hill; 53.76698°N 1.76744°W	—	c. 1820–30	A row of sandstone cottages with bracketed eaves and stone slate roofs, that of No. 38 hipped over a built-out ground floor. There are two storeys, some of the windows are mullioned with two lights, and others have inserted casement windows.	II
33, 35 and 37 Warburton Place; 53.76658°N 1.76777°W	—	c. 1820–30	A house that was later enlarged and divided, it is in sandstone with bracketed eaves and two storeys. On the earlier part is a stone slate roof, and the extension has a hipped slate roof. The earlier part has a symmetrical front of three bays, and a doorway with a moulded cornice. There is a gabled extension to the left with a two-storey bay window. The later extension has two gables, and contains two-light mullioned windows and a doorway with a pediment.	II
27–69 White Lane; 53.76606°N 1.76351°W	—	c. 1820–30	Two rows of cottages, the northern row stepped up a hill. They are in sandstone with stone slate roofs. Nos. 27–29 have console bracketed eaves and the others have dentilled eaves. The doorways have squared jambs, and the windows either have a single light, or are mullioned with two lights.	II
Henderson Place; 53.76654°N 1.76747°W	—	1822	A row of four sandstone cottages with two storeys, Nos. 21–25 are the earlier, and No. 27 was added in about 1850–60. Nos. 21–25 have a sill band, block brackets to the eaves, and a stone slate roof with a saddlestone and a large kneeler. The doorways have squared jambs, No. 25 has a dated lintel, and some mullioned windows have been retained. No. 27 has two bays and flat bracketed eaves to a slate roof.	II
18–26 Wibsey Bank; 53.76772°N 1.76399°W	—	1824	A row of four sandstone cottages with bracketed eaves and a stone slate roof. There are two storeys, the doorways have squared jambs, and the windows either have a single light, or are mullioned with three lights, and some have been replaced by casements. In the centre of the row is an initialled and dated plaque.	II
28–34 Beacon Road; 53.76839°N 1.78391°W	—	Early 19th century	A row of single-storey sandstone cottages with stone slate roofs. The doorways have flush surrounds, and the windows are mullioned with two lights.	II
104–112 Beacon Road; 53.76870°N 1.78761°W	—	Early 19th century	A row of sandstone cottages with a stone slate roof. There are two storeys, and each cottage has a doorway with flush surrounds, a single-light window above, and two-light mullioned windows with some mullions removed.	II
7 and 9 Brownroyd Hill Road; 53.77128°N 1.77585°W	—	Early 19th century	Originally four single-storey cottages, later combined into two, they are in sandstone with a stone slate roof. The windows are mullioned with two lights.	II
27 Brownroyd Hill Road; 53.77096°N 1.77614°W	—	Early 19th century	A sandstone cottage with quoins and a stone slate roof. There is one storey, a plain doorway, and three windows with fixed panes.	II
31–35 Brownroyd Hill Road; 53.77094°N 1.77643°W	—	Early 19th century	A row of three cottages, No. 31 has one storey, and the others have two. They are in sandstone with slate roofs. Some windows have single lights, others are mullioned with two or three lights, and two bow windows have been inserted.	II
41 Brownroyd Hill Road; 53.77087°N 1.77663°W	—	Early 19th century	A row of three single-storey cottages later combined into one, it is in sandstone with stone slate roof. The windows are mullioned with two lights, and one has been replaced by a bow window.	II
47 Brownroyd Hill Road; 53.77077°N 1.77681°W	—	Early 19th century	A pair of single-storey cottages later combined into one, it is in sandstone with stone slate roof. The doorway has a plain surround, and the windows are mullioned with three lights.	II
1–6 Coll Place; 53.76316°N 1.76277°W	—	Early 19th century	A row of six stone cottages with a sill band and stone slate roofs. The doorways have plain surrounds, and most of the windows are mullioned with casements.	II
10–13 Coll Place; 53.76291°N 1.76315°W	—	Early 19th century	A row of four stone cottages with a sill band, and stone slate roofs with coped gables. There are two storeys, the doorways have plain surrounds and the windows either have single lights, or are mullioned with two lights.	II
19–23 Coll Place; 53.76277°N 1.76345°W	—	Early 19th century	A row of stone cottages that have an L-shaped plan, with No. 23 set at right angles. They have stone slate roofs, two storeys, doorways with plain surrounds, and two-light mullioned windows.	II
24 Coll Place; 53.76266°N 1.76312°W	—	Early 19th century	A sandstone cottage with a stone slate roof and one storey. The doorway has a plain surround and the windows are mullioned.	II
177–193 High Street; 53.76701°N 1.77338°W	—	Early 19th century	A group of back to back houses in sandstone with stone slate roofs. They have one storey, the windows are mullioned with two lights, and there is one dormer.	II
223–229 High Street; 53.76665°N 1.77469°W	—	Early 19th century	A row of four sandstone cottages with flat eaves brackets and a stone slate roof. There are two storeys, the doorways have squared jambs, and the windows either have a single light, or are mullioned with two lights, and some mullions removed.	II
3–13 Rooley Lane; 53.76837°N 1.76129°W	—	Early 19th century	A row of sandstone houses, some with sill bands, and stone slate roofs with a shaped kneeler on the left. There are two storeys and basements, the doorways have squared jambs, and the windows either have a single light, or are mullioned with two lights, and some mullions removed.	II
15–23 Rooley Lane; 53.76833°N 1.76086°W	—	Early 19th century	A row of sandstone houses with a stone slate roof, two storeys and basements. The doorways have squared jambs, and the windows either have a single light, or are mullioned with three lights, and some mullions removed.	II
76–82 Wibsey Bank; 53.76695°N 1.76546°W	—	Early 19th century	Two pairs of cottages in a row, stepped up a hill, they are in sandstone, some with sill bands, some with bracketed eaves, and stone slate roofs. There are two storeys, the doorways have squared jambs, and the windows either have a single light, or are mullioned with two or three lights, and some mullions removed.	II
84 Wibsey Bank; 53.76686°N 1.76568°W		Early 19th century	A sandstone house with dentilled eaves and a stone slate roof. There are two storeys and four bays. In the ground floor are two two-light mullioned windows, the other windows have single lights, and on the front is a Victorian trellised porch.	II
58, 60 and 62 Holroyd Hill; 53.76707°N 1.76852°W	—	c. 1830	A house, later divided, it is in sandstone, with modillion eaves brackets and a stone slate roof. There are two storeys and a symmetrical front of three bays. The central doorway has a squared surround and a shallow cornice hood on long shaped brackets, and the windows are replacements.	II
2 Pothouse Road; 53.76444°N 1.77723°W	—	c. 1830	A house, later divided, in sandstone with a stone slate roof. There are two storeys, two doorways, one with squared jambs, single-light windows over the doorways, and elsewhere the windows are mullioned with two lights.	II
7–9 Coll Place, walls, privy and gate piers 53.76307°N 1.76295°W	—	c. 1830–40	Three cottages set back in a row of earlier cottages, they are in millstone grit with bracketed eaves, and stone slate roofs. There are two storeys, and in front of No. 7 is a single-bay extension. The doorways have plain surrounds, some windows have single lights, and others are mullioned with some mullions removed. The front gardens are enclosed by millstone grit walls with flat copings and gate piers. Behind No. 7 is an outdoor coal hole and privy.	II
1, 3 and 5 Green End Road; 53.76520°N 1.77752°W	—	c. 1830–40	A row of sandstone cottages with bracketed eaves and a stone slate roof. There are two storeys, the doorways have squared jambs, and the windows are without mullions.	II
38–54 Folly Hill Road; 53.76466°N 1.77748°W	—	c. 1830–50	A group of sandstone cottages with spaced eaves brackets and stone slate roofs. Nos. 38–42 have a single storey, and are at right angles to the others that have two storeys. Some windows have a single light, and the others are mullioned with two lights. No. 54 has an outhouse.	II
3 and 5 Brownroyd Hill Road; 53.77126°N 1.77637°W	—	Early to mid 19th century	A pair of sandstone cottages with a stone slate roof. There are two storeys, doorways with plain surrounds, and mullioned windows with two and three lights.	II
St Paul's Church; 53.76376°N 1.77805°W		1838	The church is in sandstone, and in Early English style. It has a cruciform plan, consisting of a nave, shallow north and south transepts, a south porch, a chancel, and a west steeple. The steeple has a tower with clasping buttresses, a south doorway with an ogee arch, and an octagonal spire. The windows are lancets, with triple stepped lancets in the transepts.	II
Former Hare and Hounds Public House; 53.76747°N 1.76382°W		c. 1840	The former public house is in sandstone, and has a stone slate roof with saddlestones. There are two storeys, a double-pile plan, and symmetrical fronts of three bays. The central doorways have squared jambs, the window above the front doorway has a round head and a keystone, and the other windows are sashes.	II
Upper George Public House; 53.76704°N 1.77584°W		c. 1840	The public house and adjoining former cottage to the right are in sandstone, with dentilled eaves, and stone slate roofs with saddlestones. The main part has two storeys, and the former cottage has one. The windows either have single lights, or are mullioned with two lights. The doorway to the former cottage has squared jambs, and that to the main part has pilasters and an entablature.	II
130–138 High Street; 53.76760°N 1.77193°W	—	c. 1840–50	A row of six sandstone cottages with a stone slate roof. There are two storeys, the doorways have cornices on long console brackets, over each doorway is a single-light window, and the other windows are mullioned with two lights.	II
140 High Street; 53.76753°N 1.77221°W	—	c. 1840–50	A house, later used as an office, it is in sandstone, with bracketed eaves and a stone slate roof. There are two storeys and a symmetrical front of two bays. In the centre is a porch with a pediment flanked by shop windows.	II
12 Wisbey Bank; 53.76809°N 1.76326°W		c. 1840–50	A sandstone house with quoin pilasters, bracketed eaves, and a stone slate roof with kneelers formed by consoles. There are two storeys and a symmetrical front of three bays. The central doorway has pilasters, a semicircular fanlight, and a full entablature with a deep cornice and a blocking course, and the windows are sashes.	II
The former Windmill Inn; 53.76741°N 1.77275°W	—	c. 1840–50	The former public house was built on the site of an earlier windmill. It is in sandstone with quoins and a hipped slate roof. There are two storeys and an irregular plan. Some windows are mullioned, and others have architraves.	II
St Matthew's Church; 53.76903°N 1.76385°W		1848–49	The church is in sandstone, and in Decorated style. It consists of a nave, north and south aisles, a north porch, and a lower chancel. On the west gable end is a corbelled bellcote with a spire.	II
57–69 and 69A Holroyd Hill; 53.76681°N 1.76852°W	—	c. 1850	A row of sandstone cottages stepped up a hill, with bracketed eaves and slate roofs. Most of the cottages have two storeys, and No. 69 has three. No. 57 at the left end has a canted corner and a hipped roof, and it contains a shop window. At the rear of No. 69 is a four-storey warehouse.	II
71–83 Holroyd Hill; 53.76680°N 1.76905°W	—	c. 1850	A row of cottages stepped up a hill, in sandstone, with shallow eaves brackets and stone slate roofs. They have two storeys, doorways with squared jambs, and replaced windows. The doorways of Nos. 77 and 79 have cornices on consoles, and that of No. 83 also has pilasters, and it contains a canted bay window.	II
Buttershaw First School; 53.76322°N 1.77753°W		c. 1850	The school is in sandstone on a plinth, with a string course, a sill band, and a slate roof with coped gables. There is a single storey, and the school consists of a six-bay hall range with a cross-wing on the left. The windows are mullioned with hood moulds. In the gable end of the cross-wing is a coat of arms, and in the south gable end are stepped windows.	II
1–9 Giles Street; 53.76925°N 1.78491°W	—	c. 1850–55	A stepped terrace of sandstone houses on a swept plinth, with sill bands, and slate roofs. There are two storeys, and the doorways have Tuscan pilasters.	II
Sunday School; 53.76671°N 1.77027°W	—	1854	The Sunday school is in sandstone with a hipped stone slate roof. There is one storey, ten sash windows along the side, and a doorway with a cornice. The west end is gabled, and contains paired round-headed windows.	II
Former Richard Dunn Sports Centre; 53.76675°N 1.75899°W		1974–78	The former sports centre was named after the boxer Richard Dunn. It is built with concrete edge beams, a steel cable-stayed roof covered with aluminium, concrete-block walls, and aluminium glazing, and there is a glazed steel access bridge. It is a tent-like structure with an oval plan, and is 100 metres (330 ft) long, 60 metres (200 ft) wide, and 40 metres (130 ft) high. The roof is supported by elliptical concrete arches, and at each end is a mast rising for 7 metres (23 ft) carrying cables supporting the lattice-girder construction. The reception area is accessed by a glazed bridge. The internal fittings have been removed.	II
