= Bunny Johnson =

Jamaican boxer (born 1947)

Bunny Johnson (born 10 May 1947 in Jamaica) is a Jamaican-born former boxer who was The British heavyweight Champion in 1975 beating Danny McAlinden by knockout. He also competed in the light heavyweight division and won a Lonsdale belt.

He finished his boxing career with a record of 55 wins – 17 losses – 1 draw.

== Professional boxing record ==
55 Wins (33 knockouts, 22 decisions), 17 Losses (8 knockouts, 9 decisions), 1 Draw
Result	Record	Opponent	Type	Round	Date	Location	Notes
Loss	55–17–1	(Australia) Steve Aczel	TKO	6	18 Sep 1981	(Australia) Brisbane	
Win	55–16–1	(Tonga) Fatei Namoa	KO	6	29 Jul 1981	(Australia) Gosford, New South Wales	
Loss	54–16–1	(Australia) Tony Mundine	TKO	10	20 May 1981	(Australia) Gold Coast, Queensland	Referee stopped the bout at 2:43 of the tenth round.
Win	54–15–1	(United States) Mike Quarry	TKO	7	8 Feb 1981	(Australia) Sydney	
Loss	53–15–1	(Kenya) John Odhiambho	PTS	6	12 Jun 1980	(Denmark) Randers	
Win	53–14–1	(United Kingdom) Dennis Andries	PTS	15	27 Feb 1980	(England) Burslem	BBBofC British Light Heavyweight Title.
Loss	52–14–1	(France) Sylvain Watbled	PTS	10	10 Dec 1979	(France) Paris	
Loss	52–13–1	(Zambia) Lottie Mwale	PTS	10	23 Oct 1979	(England) Wembley	
Loss	52–12–1	(United States) James Scott	TKO	7	1 Jul 1979	(United States) Woodbridge, New Jersey	
Win	52–11–1	(Scotland) Rab Affleck	KO	4	13 May 1979	(Scotland) Glasgow	BBBofC British Light Heavyweight Title.
Loss	51–11–1	(Uganda) Mustafa Wasajja	PTS	6	15 Feb 1979	(Denmark) Randers	
Win	51–10–1	(United Kingdom) Dennis Andries	PTS	10	22 Jan 1979	(England) Wolverhampton	
Win	50–10–1	(France) Sylvain Watbled	KO	6	14 Sep 1978	(France) Paris	
Loss	49–10–1	(United States) David Conteh	TKO	3	7 Feb 1978	(England) Islington	
Loss	49–9–1	(Italy) Aldo Traversaro	TKO	11	26 Nov 1977	(Italy) Genoa	EBU Light Heavyweight Title.
Win	49–8–1	(United Kingdom) Terry Mintus	KO	1	1 Jun 1977	(England) Dudley	
Win	48–8–1	(United Kingdom) Harry White	TKO	9	17 May 1977	(England) Wolverhampton	BBBofC British Light Heavyweight Title.
Win	47–8–1	(United Kingdom) Tim Wood	KO	1	8 Mar 1977	(England) Wolverhampton	BBBofC British Light Heavyweight Title.
Win	46–8–1	(United Kingdom) Phil Martin	TKO	10	14 Dec 1976	(England) West Bromwich	
Win	45–8–1	(United Kingdom) Peter Brisland	KO	7	27 Sep 1976	(England) Piccadilly	
Loss	44–8–1	(United States) Duane Bobick	TKO	8	24 May 1976	(Germany) Munich	
Draw	44–7–1	(United Kingdom) Billy Aird	PTS	10	21 Mar 1976	(United Kingdom) Frimley Green	
Win	44–7	(United Kingdom) Fonomanu Young Sekona	KO	2	1 Dec 1975	(New Zealand) Auckland	Sekona knocked out at 1:06 of the second round.
Loss	43–7	(United Kingdom) Richard Dunn	PTS	15	30 Sep 1975	(England) Wembley	BBBofC British/Commonwealth Heavyweight Titles.
Win	43–6	(United States) Ray Anderson	PTS	8	19 Jun 1975	Oslo, Norway	
Win	42–6	(United States) Obie English	TKO	3	12 May 1975	(England) Mayfair	
Win	41–6	(Puerto Rico) Angel Oquendo	TKO	10	11 Mar 1975	(England) Wembley	Referee stopped the bout at 2:45 of the tenth round.
Win	40–6	(Puerto Rico) Pedro Agosto	PTS	10	19 Feb 1975	(England) Manchester	
Win	39–6	(United Kingdom) Danny McAlinden	KO	9	13 Jan 1975	(England) Mayfair	BBBofC British/Commonwealth Heavyweight Titles.
Win	38–6	(Jamaica) Oliver Wright	PTS	10	21 May 1974	(England) Wembley	
Win	37–6	(Tonga) Koli Vailea	KO	3	11 Mar 1974	(England) Mayfair	
Win	36–6	(United States) Roy Wallace	TKO	4	18 Feb 1974	(England) Mayfair	
Win	35–6	(United Kingdom) Richard Dunn	KO	10	11 Oct 1973	(England) Belle Vue, Manchester	
Win	34–6	(United States) Morris Jackson	TKO	5	2 Jul 1973	(England) Kensington	
Win	33–6	(United Kingdom) Les Stevens	PTS	10	5 Jun 1973	(England) Kensington	
Win	32–6	(Saint Helena) Guinea Roger	TKO	6	30 Apr 1973	(England) Bedford	
Win	31–6	(United States) Roger Russell	TKO	5	20 Nov 1972	(England) Wolverhampton	
Win	30–6	(United Kingdom) Billy Aird	PTS	8	23 Oct 1972	(England) Mayfair	
Win	29–6	(Nigeria) Guinea Roger	PTS	8	11 Oct 1972	(England) Stoke-on-Trent	
Win	28–6	(United Kingdom) Roger Tighe	PTS	8	27 Jun 1972	(England) Birmingham	
Win	27–6	(United Kingdom) Brian Jewett	PTS	8	25 Apr 1972	(England) Birmingham	
Win	26–6	(Wales) Eddie Avoth	TKO	3	15 Mar 1972	(Wales) Caerphilly	
Win	25–6	(Antigua and Barbuda) Rocky Campbell	PTS	8	26 Jan 1972	(England) Wolverhampton	
Win	24–6	(United Kingdom) Peter Boddington	TKO	4	9 Nov 1971	(England) Wolverhampton	
Win	23–6	(United Kingdom) Brian Jewitt	TKO	7	20 Oct 1971	(England) Stoke-on-Trent	
Loss	22–6	(Wales) Dennis Avoth	PTS	8	22 Sep 1971	(England) Solihull	
Loss	22–5	(United Kingdom) Richard Dunn	PTS	8	13 Apr 1971	(England) Wolverhampton	
Win	22–4	(United States) Jerry Judge	PTS	10	22 Mar 1971	(England) Mayfair	
Win	21–4	(United States) Dick Hall	PTS	10	24 Feb 1971	(England) Wolverhampton	
Win	20–4	(United Kingdom) Billy Aird	PTS	8	11 Nov 1970	(England) Solihull	
Win	19–4	(Wales) Dennis Avoth	PTS	10	19 Oct 1970	(Wales) Aberavon	
Win	18–4	(Antigua and Barbuda) Rocky Campbell	KO	4	6 May 1970	(England) Solihull	
Win	17–4	(United Kingdom) Maxie Smith	KO	3	24 Mar 1970	(England) Wembley	
Win	16–4	(Nigeria) Guinea Roger	TKO	1	14 Jan 1970	(England) Solihull	
Loss	15–4	(Wales) Eddie Avoth	PTS	8	27 Oct 1969	(Nottinghamshire) Nottingham	
Win	15–3	(United Kingdom) Terry Daly	TKO	1	29 Sep 1969	(England) Mayfair	
Loss	14–3	(United Kingdom) Roger Tighe	PTS	10	27 Aug 1969	(United Kingdom) Cottingham	
Win	14–2	(Antigua and Barbuda) Billy Wynter	TKO	1	9 Aug 1969	(England) Bedford	Referee stopped the bout at 1:55 of the first round.
Win	13–2	(Wales) Dennis Avoth	PTS	8	7 May 1969	(England) Solihull	
Win	12–2	(Denmark) Hans Jørgen Jacobsen	KO	2	10 Apr 1969	(Denmark) Copenhagen	
Win	11–2	(United Kingdom) Peter Boddington	PTS	8	25 Mar 1969	(England) Wembley	
Loss	10–2	(United Kingdom) Roger Tighe	KO	6	2 Jan 1969	(England) Piccadilly	
Loss	10–1	(Nigeria) Guinea Roger	KO	6	20 Nov 1968	(England) Solihull	
Win	10–0	(Jamaica) Lloyd Walford	PTS	8	23 Oct 1968	(England) Mayfair	
Win	9–0	(Jamaica) Lloyd Walford	PTS	8	1 Oct 1968	(England) Wolverhampton	
Win	8–0	(United Kingdom) George Dulaire	TKO	6	16 Sep 1968	(England) Mayfair	
Win	7–0	(Nigeria) Guinea Roger	PTS	8	12 Aug 1968	(England) Blackpool	
Win	6–0	(United Kingdom) Tommy Woods	TKO	2	29 Apr 1968	(England) Manchester	
Win	5–0	(Antigua and Barbuda) Billy Wynter	PTS	6	2 Apr 1968	(England) Wolverhampton	
Win	4–0	(United Kingdom) Paul Brown	PTS	6	26 Mar 1968	(England) Birmingham	
Win	3–0	(United Kingdom) Roy Ferguson	KO	3	6 Mar 1968	(England) Solihull	
Win	2–0	(United Kingdom) Bernard Pollard	TKO	3	20 Feb 1968	(England) Wolverhampton	
Win	1–0	(United Kingdom) Peter Thomas	TKO	2	8 Feb 1968	(England) Bristol	Referee stopped the bout at 1:15 of the second round.

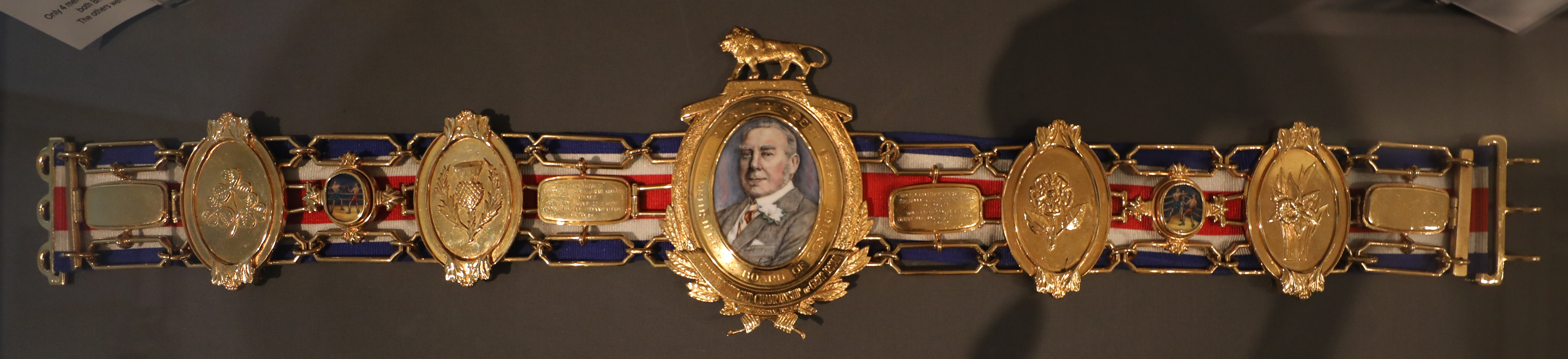
Bunny Johnson's Light Heavyweight Lonsdale Belt
