= Tim Wood =

Tim Wood may refer to:

== People ==
- Harold "Tim" Wood (1902–1980), English aviator and test pilot
- Timothy Wood (born 1940), British politician
- Tim Wood (figure skater) (Timothy Lyle Wood, born 1948), American figure skater
- Tim Wood (boxer) (1951–2010), British boxer
- Tim Wood (baseball) (Timothy Dayle Wood, born 1982), American baseball player

== Other uses ==
- TIMWOOD, a mnemonic for the seven wastes of muda lean process thinking
