= Tony Owen (boxer) =

English boxer

Personal information
- Nationality: British
- Born: 18 February 1987 (age 39)
- Weight: Light Welterweight

Boxing career
- Stance: Southpaw

Boxing record
- Total fights: 20
- Wins: 16
- Win by KO: 3
- Losses: 4
- Draws: 0

Tony Owen (born 18 February 1987) is a British professional boxer from Carshalton who is currently competing in the light welterweight division.

Owen is managed by London-based promoter Michael Helliet (MD of the Mayfair Sporting Club).

Due to the technical ability that Owen possesses as well as the fact that he is a tall rangy southpaw he is considered to be a future prospect and will pose difficulties to opponents in the division.
