= Odsal =

Coordinates: 53.7571°N 1.7588°W

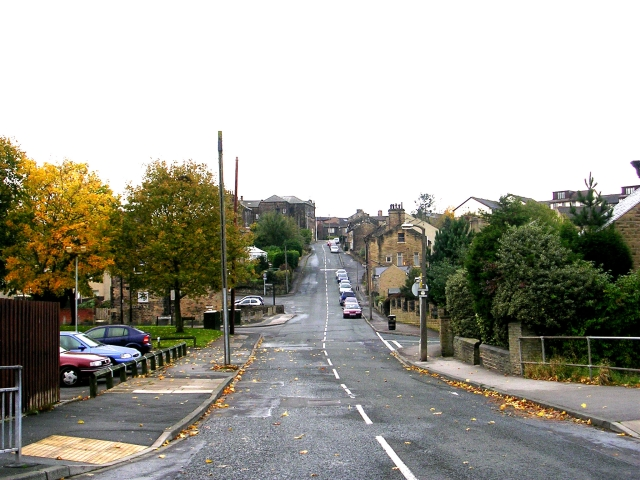
- Wibsey Bank, Odsal

- Location within West Yorkshire
- OS grid reference: SE1529
- Metropolitan borough: City of Bradford
- Metropolitan county: West Yorkshire
- Region: Yorkshire and the Humber
- Country: England
- Sovereign state: United Kingdom
- Post town: BRADFORD
- Postcode district: BD6
- Police: West Yorkshire
- Fire: West Yorkshire
- Ambulance: Yorkshire
- UK Parliament: Bradford South

Odsal is an area of the City of Bradford, West Yorkshire.

Odsal Stadium is currently the home of Bradford rugby league club and YorStox F1 and F2 stock cars. The Richard Dunn Sports Centre is named after the boxer who lived in Bradford at the time of his 1976 bout against Muhammad Ali.

== Sport ==
Amateur rugby league side Odsal Sedbergh, founded in 1980, play their game on Cleckheaton Road and, as of 2017, compete in the Yorkshire Men's League First Division
