= Instant Justice =

- Directed by: Denis Amar
- Written by: Paul Brickman
- Produced by: Craig T. Rumar
- Starring: Michael Paré; Tawny Kitaen; Peter Crook; Eddie Avoth; Charles Napier
- Cinematography: Douglas F. O'Neons
- Edited by: Pieter Bergema
- Music by: David Kurtz
- Distributed by: Warner Bros. Pictures
- Release date: January 1987
- Running time: 101 minutes
- Country: Gibraltar
- Language: English

Instant Justice, a.k.a. Marine Issue is a 1987 action-drama film starring Michael Paré, Charles Napier, Eddie Avoth and Tawny Kitaen. Pare plays the role of Scott Youngblood, a marine in Spain who seeks revenge for his sister's murder. The movie was written by Craig T. Rumar. The film was directed by Denis Amar.

== Plot ==
Scott is a US Marine who serves in the US embassy in Paris. One day he gets a message that his long unseen sister Kim, who works as a model in Spain, is in serious trouble; he asks for a dismissal from his outpost and travels to Spain to help her. Unfortunately she's murdered before Scott's arrival. Local police are somewhat reluctant to take any action, so Scott starts investigation on his own.

After a couple of days of sniffing around, he meets with Kim's girlfriend, Virginia, who's pointing him towards drug business-related people who might be responsible for the crime. Fellow Marine Major Davis (played by Charles Napier), who serves in the Spanish embassy, is of great assistance to Scott as well, as he risks his own neck and steals some weapons from the embassy for him. At the end Scott finds the people responsible for his sister's death and serves them instant justice.

== Cast ==
- Michael Paré as Sgt. Scott Youngblood
- Tawny Kitaen as Virginia
- Peter Crook as Jake
- Charles Napier as Maj. Davis
- Eddie Avoth as Silke
- Scott Del Amo as Dutch
- Lynda Bridges as Kim Taylor
- Lionel A. Ephraim as Ambassador Gordon
- Maurice E. Aronow as Shelton
- Aldo Sambrell as Lt. Juan Muñoz (credited as Aldo San Brell)
- Peter Boulter as Clarke
- Thomas Abbott as Lt. Harding
- Anthony Bingham as Sgt. Walker
- Scott Miller as Col. Parker
- Steve Heywood as Cpl. Atkinson (credited as Steve Haywood)
- Manuel de Blas as Ochoa
- Angel Mancuso as Tony
