= Richard Dunn (boxer) =

British boxer (born 1945)

Personal information
- Nationality: (United Kingdom) British
- Born: 19 January 1945 (age 81) Halifax, West Riding of Yorkshire, England
- Height: 6 ft 3 in (1.91 m)
- Weight: Heavyweight

Boxing career
- Stance: Southpaw

Boxing record
- Total fights: 45
- Wins: 33
- Win by KO: 16
- Losses: 12
- Draws: 0
- No contests: 0

Richard Dunn (born 19 January 1945) is an English former heavyweight boxer who was the British (1975–76), European (1976) and Commonwealth (1975–76) Champion. He unsuccessfully challenged Muhammad Ali for the world heavyweight championship in 1976.

== Early life ==
Richard Dunn was born in Halifax, West Riding of Yorkshire on 19 January 1945. He played rugby in his teens and early 20s. Starting boxing as an amateur in the early 1960s, he turned professional in his mid-20s whilst continuing to work as a scaffolder, living in Bradford, West Yorkshire. He was unable to afford the expense of sparring partners to train with for most of his career, and his coach was his father-in-law. He was a soldier in the British Army, serving as a non-commissioned officer with 4th Battalion, Parachute Regiment in the 1960s-70s, being awarded the Corps' Fishmongers' Trophy in 1974.

== Boxing career ==
A southpaw, Dunn's professional career began with a win over Cardiff fighter Del Phillips in a heavyweight eliminator competition in Mayfair, London in July 1969. His second fight was on the same day in the semi-final. It was a first-round defeat against Danny McAlinden, who dispatched all three of his opponents in under three rounds to win the competition. However, in May 1973, Dunn defeated Billy Aird on points in an eliminator for the British Heavyweight Championship at Grosvenor House in London. He lost the final eliminator against Bunny Johnson, in October, after a tenth-round knockout at the King's Hall in Manchester. However, when he faced the same opponent at the Empire Pool at Wembley for both the British and Commonwealth titles in September 1975, he prevailed on points, after 15 rounds.

=== British title ===
Dunn made his first defence against McAlinden two months later. However, this time it was Dunn that won with a knockout after McAlinden went down three times in the second round.

On 6 April 1976 Dunn won the European Heavyweight Title by a third-round TKO of the German boxer Bernd August at the Royal Albert Hall in London.

=== Title shot ===
On 24 May 1976 Dunn was given the chance of fighting for the WBC and WBA titles against the American champion Muhammad Ali at the Olympic Hall in Munich, Germany. Dunn, despite fighting in a spirited fashion, found himself seriously outmatched by Ali in power and technique, being knocked down several times by the American champion, who clearly realized the un-equalness of the competition in his favour and began to land carefully timed and weighted punches to stun Dunn but minimize the chance of physical injury to him as the fight went on. At the 2:05 minute mark in the fifth round Dunn went to the canvas for the final time and the referee stopped the bout, with Ali playing to the crowd comically windmilling a punch that was coming that would be devastating, and to encourage the referee to stop the fight as having run its course. This was to be the last knockout Ali achieved in his professional career.

=== Aftermath ===
Dunn lost his next fight in London five months later with Joe Bugner, surrendering all his titles in a first-round knock-out. His final fight was a fifth-round knock-out defeat to the South African boxer Kallie Knoetze at the Ellis Park Tennis Stadium in Johannesburg on 10 September 1977, after which Dunn retired from the sport.

Dunn was the subject of This Is Your Life in 1976 when he was surprised by Eamonn Andrews just ahead of his fight with Muhammad Ali.

== Post-career civic honours ==
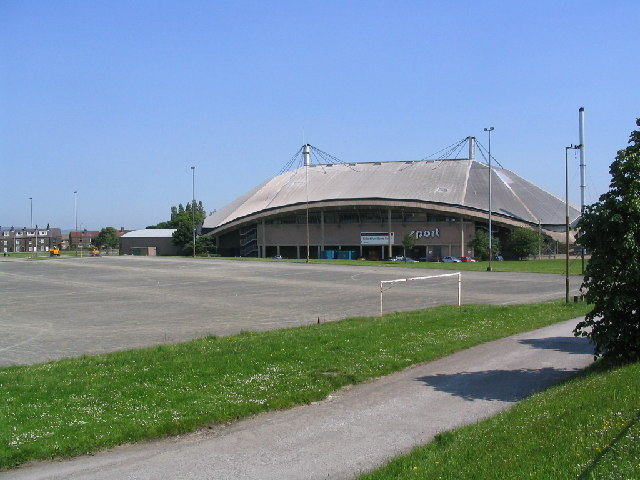
Richard Dunn Sports Centre, Odsal Top, Bradford

The 'Richard Dunn Sports Centre' was opened by Bradford Council in Dunn's home town in 1978, named in honour of his sporting achievements. The facility was closed in November 2019, and was due to be demolished in 2020, with the Council announcing the intention to name a new road on the site after Dunn in the future. However the future of the unused leisure centre is now in doubt, after Historic England granted the building Grade II listed status, following an appeal by the Twentieth Century Society.

== Later life ==
After his sports career, having lost money in a failed hotel venture, Dunn lived in Scarborough, North Yorkshire with his wife Janet and three children, returning to work as a scaffolder. He was seriously injured in 1989 on an oil rig in the North Sea after a 40 ft fall which broke both of his legs. In retirement he lives in Scarborough, where he has been associated with charity work for Parkinson's UK and is the honorary president of the town's amateur boxing club.

Dunn has dementia and Alzheimer's disease.

== Professional boxing record ==
33 Wins (16 knockouts, 17 decisions), 12 Losses (11 knockouts, 1 decision)
Result	Record	Opponent	Type	Round	Date	Location	Notes
Loss	12-2	(South Africa) Kallie Knoetze	KO	5	10 Sep 1977	Ellis Park Tennis Stadium, Johannesburg, South Africa	
Loss	51-7-1	(United Kingdom) Joe Bugner	KO	1	12 Oct 1976	Empire Pool, London, England	BBBofC British/Commonwealth/EBU Heavyweight Titles.
Loss	51-2	(United States) Muhammad Ali	TKO	5	24 May 1976	Olympiahalle, Munich, Germany	WBA/WBC Heavyweight Titles. Referee stopped the bout at 2:05 of the fifth round.
Win	21-2-1	(Germany) Bernd August	TKO	3	6 Apr 1976	Royal Albert Hall, London, England	EBU Heavyweight Title. Referee stopped the bout at 1:38 of the third round.
Win	32-12-1	(United States) Terry Krueger	TKO	3	25 Nov 1975	Royal Albert Hall, London, England	Referee stopped the bout at 2:29 of the third round.
Win	27-5-2	(United Kingdom) Danny McAlinden	KO	2	4 Nov 1975	Empire Pool, London, England	BBBofC British/Commonwealth Heavyweight Titles.
Win	43-6	(Jamaica) Bunny Johnson	PTS	15	30 Sep 1975	Empire Pool, London, England	BBBofC British/Commonwealth Heavyweight Titles.
Win	22-17-3	(Antigua and Barbuda) Rocky Campbell	TKO	7	7 May 1975	Solihull Civic Hall, Solihull, England	
Win	5-1	(Wales) Neville Meade	TKO	4	17 Feb 1975	Grosvenor House, London, England	
Win	8-2-1	(United Kingdom) Tim Wood	PTS	8	9 Sep 1974	Grosvenor House, London, England	
Loss	44-5-3	(Spain) Jose Manuel Urtain	KO	4	22 May 1974	Madrid, Spain	
Loss	2-1-2	(Nigeria) Ngozika Ekwelum	KO	7	11 Apr 1974	Berlin, Germany	
Loss	9-4-1	(United States) Jimmy Young	TKO	8	18 Feb 1974	Mayfair Sporting Club, London, England	
Win	12-2	(United States) Obie English	TKO	10	14 Jan 1974	Grosvenor House, London, England	Referee stopped the bout at 2:50 of the tenth round.
Loss	34-6	(Jamaica) Bunny Johnson	KO	10	11 Oct 1973	(Lancashire) King's Hall, Manchester, England	
Win	12-5	(United States) Larry Beilfuss	TKO	4	9 Jul 1973	Grosvenor House, London, England	
Win	13-5-2	(United Kingdom) Billy Aird	PTS	10	14 May 1973	Grosvenor House, London, England	
Win	21-7	(United States) Johnny Griffin	KO	3	15 Mar 1973	Grosvenor House, London, England	
Win	17-5	(United States) Rufus Brassell	DQ	3	13 Feb 1973	Wolverhampton Civic Hall, Wolverhampton, England	
Win	17-2	(United States) Roy Williams	PTS	8	15 Jan 1973	Grosvenor House, London, England	
Win	24-10-5	(United States) Ray Patterson	PTS	8	20 Nov 1972	Grosvenor House, London, England	
Win	16-5	(Canada) Larry Renaud	KO	1	16 Oct 1972	Grosvenor House, London, England	Renaud knocked out at 1:45 of the first round.
Win	21-6-3	(United Kingdom) Roger Tighe	PTS	10	21 Mar 1972	(Yorkshire) Midland Hotel, Bradford, England	
Win	3-2	(United States) Ron Oliver	KO	1	21 Feb 1972	Mayfair Sporting Club, London, England	
Loss	18-11-1	(Antigua and Barbuda) Rocky Campbell	TKO	1	9 Dec 1971	Wolverhampton Civic Hall, Wolverhampton, England	
Win	11-3	(England) Cliff Field	TKO	4	24 Nov 1971	(Nottinghamshire) Nottingham Ice Stadium, Nottingham, England	
Win	31-10	(Wales) Carl Gizzi	PTS	8	22 Sep 1971	Solihull Civic Hall, Solihull, England	
Win	8-2	(Jamaica) Dennis Forbes	PTS	8	22 Jun 1971	Cafe Royal, London, England	
Win	22-4	(Jamaica) Bunny Johnson	PTS	8	13 Apr 1971	(England) Wolverhampton Civic Hall, Wolverhampton, United Kingdom	
Win	7-3-2	(United Kingdom) Brian Jewitt	PTS	8	25 Jan 1971	National Sporting Club, London, England	
Win	6-1	(Jamaica) Dennis Forbes	KO	1	14 Dec 1970	National Sporting Club, London, England	
Loss	8-18-4	(United Kingdom) George Dulaire	TKO	1	2 Nov 1970	County Hotel, Bedford, England	
Loss	6-1	(United Kingdom) Billy Aird	TKO	6	7 Sep 1970	(Lancashire) Hotel Piccadilly, Manchester, England	BBBofC Central Heavyweight Title.
Win	9-16-2	(United Kingdom) Obe Hepburn	TKO	5	21 May 1970	Anglo-American Sporting Club, London, England	
Win	12-25-3	(Antigua and Barbuda) Billy Wynter	PTS	6	4 May 1970	Bedford, England	
Win	9-15-2	(United Kingdom) Obe Hepburn	PTS	6	31 Mar 1970	York Hall, London, England	
Loss	4-1	(United Kingdom) Billy Aird	PTS	8	23 Feb 1970	Grosvenor House, London, England	
Win	18-22-3	(Jamaica) Lloyd Walford	PTS	6	25 Nov 1969	(Yorkshire) Leeds Town Hall, Leeds, England	
Win	5-15-3	(United Kingdom) George Dulaire	TKO	2	3 Nov 1969	County Hotel, Bedford, England	
Win	3-3	(United Kingdom) John Cullen	PTS	3	3 Nov 1969	County Hotel, Bedford, England	
Win	4-0	(United Kingdom) Billy Aird	PTS	3	3 Nov 1969	County Hotel, Bedford, England	
Win	2-4	(United Kingdom) Jack Cotes	TKO	3	13 Oct 1969	(Nottinghamshire) Nottingham Ice Stadium, Nottingham, England	
Win	2-3	(United Kingdom) Jack Cotes	TKO	2	8 Sep 1969	(Lancashire) Hotel Piccadilly, Manchester, England	
Win	7-0-1	(Wales) Del Phillips	PTS	3	7 Jul 1969	London, England	
Loss	--	(United Kingdom) Danny McAlinden	KO	1	7 Jul 1969	London, England	
