= Muhammad Ali vs. Richard Dunn =

Boxing competition

Muhammad Ali vs Richard Dunn
- Date: 24 May 1976
- Venue: Olympiahalle, Munich, Germany
- Title(s) on the line: WBA, WBC and The Ring undisputed heavyweight championship

Tale of the tape
Boxer	(United States) Muhammad Ali	(United Kingdom) Richard Dunn
Nickname	"The Greatest"	
Hometown	Louisville, Kentucky, U.S.	Halifax, West Yorkshire, UK
Purse		£52,000
Pre-fight record	51–2 (36 KO)	33–9 (16 KO)
Age	34 years, 4 months	31 years, 4 months
Height	6 ft 3 in (191 cm)	6 ft 3 in (191 cm)
Weight	220 lb (100 kg)	207 lb (94 kg)
Style	Orthodox	Southpaw
Recognition	WBA, WBC and The Ring undisputed Heavyweight Champion	British, Commonwealth and European; Heavyweight Champion

Result
- Ali wins via 5th-round TKO

Muhammad Ali vs. Richard Dunn was a professional boxing match contested on 24 May 1976, for the undisputed heavyweight championship. This fight would mark Ali's 37th and final knockout win of his career.

== Background ==
In the build up to fight, Dunn appeared on the popular ITV programme This Is Your Life in which Ali appeared via video message to taunt Dunn, saying "So you've taken 67 parachute drops, well, I want you to mark this down now: you have one more big drop to come, a big hard drop, it's going to be the longest sharp drop you've ever had."

== The fight ==
Dunn would start the fight on the front foot chasing Ali, who would land a number of overhand rights early. A pair of lefts from Dunn landed in the third; however, Ali scored a knockdown with a right later in the round. Dunn would taste the canvas twice more in the fourth and once early in the fifth before a windmilling right from Ali sent Dunn down for the fifth and final time, prompting referee Herbert Tomser to wave the contest off.

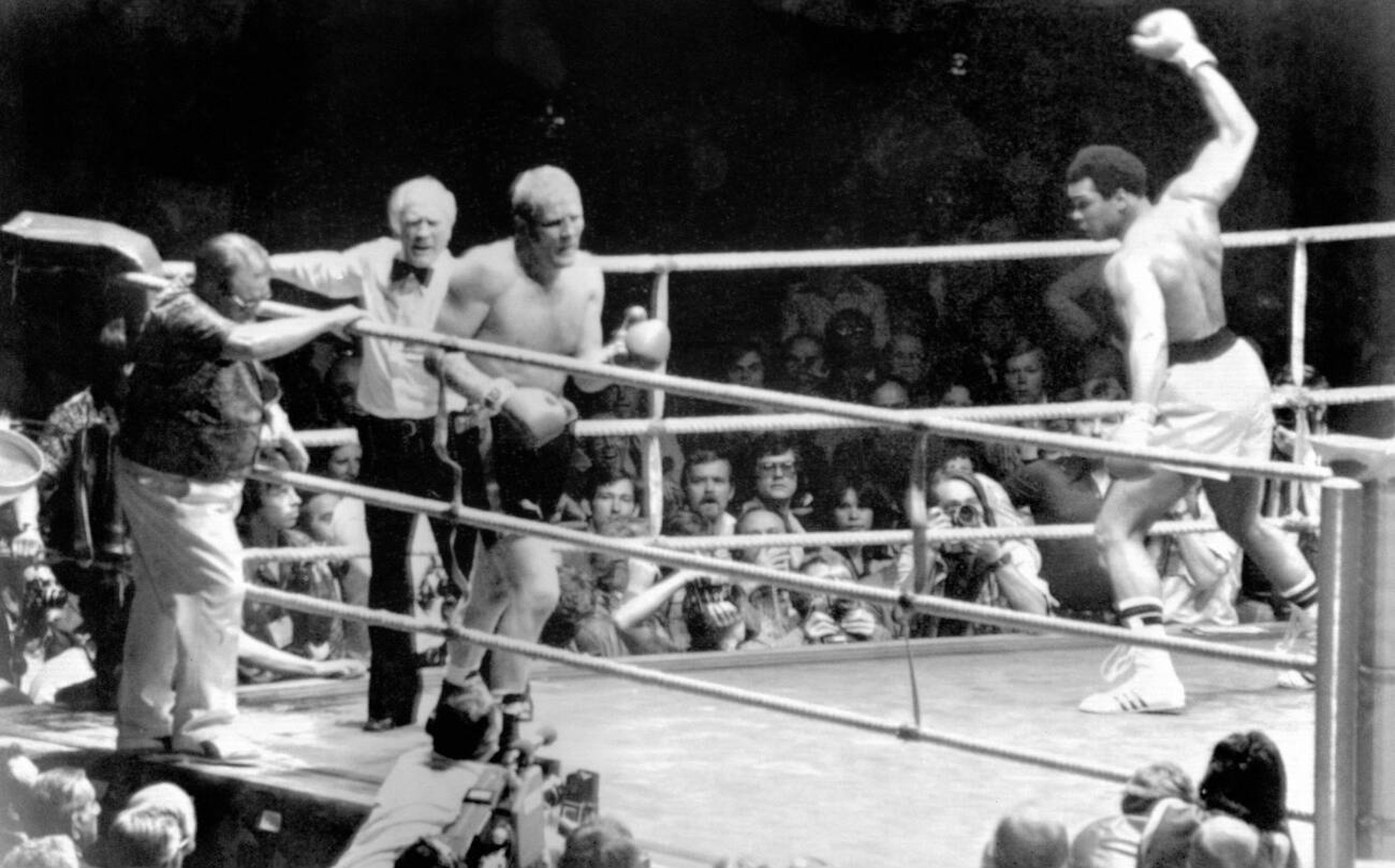

The fight is remembered for being the last time Ali won by stoppage, and also for being the last time he knocked down an opponent. The punch Ali used to knockout Dunn was taught to Ali by Taekwondo Grandmaster Jhoon Rhee. Rhee called that punch the "Accupunch", which he learnt from Bruce Lee. Rhee was Ali's head coach for this Dunn fight.

== Aftermath ==
Ali would praise Dunn, telling NBC broadcast: “He is better than I thought and I predict you will hear more from Richard Dunn.”

Tens of thousands of people would line the streets of Bradford to praise Dunn's gutsy performance and welcome him home.

== Undercard ==
Confirmed bouts:

Winner	Loser	Weight division/title belt(s) disputed	Result
(West Germany) Peter Wulf	(West Germany) Peter Scheibner	German Super Welter	Unanimous decision.
(United States) Duane Bobick	(Jamaica) Bunny Johnson	Heavyweight (10 rounds)	2nd-round TKO.
(United Kingdom) Alan Minter	(West Germany) Frank Reiche	Middleweight (10 rounds)	8th-round TKO.
(Nigeria) Ngozika Ekwelum	(United Kingdom) Tony Moore	Heavyweight (8 rounds)	Unanimous decision.
(United States) Rodney Bobick	(West Germany) Hartmut Sasse	Heavyweight (8 rounds)	3rd-round KO.
(United States) Horst Lang	(United States) Arno Prick	Heavyweight (6 rounds)	Draw.

== Broadcasting ==
Country	Broadcaster
Australia	Nine Network
Brazil	Band
Canada	CTV
France	TF1
Germany	ARD
Japan	TBS
Mexico	Televisa
Philippines	RPN 9
Spain	TVE
United Kingdom	ITV
United States	NBC

Preceded by vs. Jimmy Young	Muhammad Ali's bouts 24 May 1976	Succeeded by vs. Ken Norton III
Preceded by vs. Bernd August	Richard Dunn's bouts 24 May 1976	Succeeded by vs. Joe Bugner
