= Eddie Avoth =

Welsh boxer (born 1945)

Personal information
- Nationality: Welsh
- Born: 2 May 1945 (age 81) Cardiff, Wales
- Weight: Light-heavyweight

Boxing career
- Stance: Orthodox

Boxing record
- Total fights: 53
- Wins: 44
- Win by KO: 20
- Losses: 9
- Draws: 0
- No contests: 0

Eddie Avoth (born 2 May 1945) is a Welsh former boxer and actor. He was British and Commonwealth Light Heavyweight Boxing Champion, with a record of 44 wins (20 by knockout) from 53 fights.

== History ==
Avoth was born in Cardiff, Wales. He was a product of the Eddie Thomas boxing gym based in Merthyr Tydfil, which spawned the boxing careers of such notables as Howard Winstone and Ken Buchanan . Avoth's professional boxing career spanned nine years and in this time he won the British and Commonwealth titles. Avoth retired from the ring in 1972. He was also an accomplished amateur boxer and represented his country internationally on many occasions.

Following retirement from boxing, Avoth settled in Puerto Banús, Costa del Sol, Spain where he part-owned a well-known celebrity restaurant. He now resides back in the UK.

Avoth's acting career began with a starring role for entertainment giant Warner Brothers in their 1986 blockbuster film "Instant Justice" where he starred alongside Michael Paré, Tawny Kitaen and Charles Napier. The film was directed by Hollywood producer Craig T Rumar. In 2010 he appeared in the Howard Winstone biopic Risen as boxing promoter Jack Solomons. Avoth himself was played in the film by Welsh boxer Enzo Maccarinelli.

== Professional boxing record ==
44 Wins (20 knockouts, 24 decisions), 9 Losses (4 knockouts, 5 decisions)
Result	Record	Opponent	Type	Round	Date	Location	Notes
Loss	25–6	(Jamaica) Bunny Johnson	TKO	3	15 March 1972	Double Diamond Club, Caerphilly, United Kingdom	
Loss	13–3	(South Africa) Sarel Aucamp	PTS	10	30 October 1971	Ellis Park Stadium, Johannesburg, South Africa	
Win	11–7	(South Africa) Kosie Smith	PTS	10	12 June 1971	Ellis Park Stadium, Johannesburg, South Africa	
Win	8–15–1	(Saint Helena) Guinea Roger	PTS	8	12 May 1971	Double Diamond Club, Caerphilly, United Kingdom	
Loss	14–2	(United Kingdom) Chris Finnegan	TKO	15	24 January 1971	Grosvenor House, Mayfair, London, United Kingdom	BBBofC British/Commonwealth Light Heavyweight Titles
Win	13–1	(Australia) Trevor Thornberry	TKO	6	23 October 1970	Brisbane Festival Hall, Brisbane, Australia	Commonwealth Light Heavyweight Title
Loss	21–0	(United States) Mike Quarry	UD	10	6 June 1970	(California) Valley Music Theater, Woodland Hills, Los Angeles, United States	3–5, 3–5, 2–4
Win	33–7–1	(Republic of Ireland) John "Young" McCormack	DQ	8	6 April 1970	(Nottinghamshire) Nottingham Ice Stadium, Nottingham, United Kingdom	BBBofC British Light Heavyweight Title
Win	5–9	(France) Emilio Okee	PTS	10	16 February 1970	National Sporting Club, Piccadilly, London, United Kingdom	
Win	15–3	(Jamaica) Bunny Johnson	PTS	8	27 October 1969	(Nottinghamshire) Commodore Hotel, Nottingham, United Kingdom	
Loss	27–12–4	(Croatia) Ivan Prebeg	PTS	15	28 June 1969	Salata Stadium, Zagreb, Croatia	EBU Light Heavyweight Title
Win	17–20–3	(Jamaica) Lloyd Walford	PTS	8	17 March 1969	National Sporting Club, Piccadilly, London, United Kingdom	
Win	61–15–5	(Nicaragua) "Boxing" Luis Gutierrez	KO	4	6 February 1969	Liverpool Stadium, Liverpool, United Kingdom	
Win	30–4–1	(Republic of Ireland) John "Young" McCormack	TKO	11	13 January 1969	Anglo-American Sporting Club, Mayfair, London, United Kingdom	BBBofC British Light Heavyweight Title
Win	28–22–1	(United States) Curtis Bruce	TKO	6	18 November 1968	Grosvenor House, Mayfair, London, United Kingdom	
Win	13–21	(United States) Stanford Bulla	PTS	10	24 July 1968	Coney Beach Arena, Porthcawl, United Kingdom	50–47.5
Win	12–11–3	(United Kingdom) Johnny Hendrickson	PTS	8	24 April 1968	Sophia Gardens, Cardiff, United Kingdom	39.5–39
Win	12–10–3	(United Kingdom) Johnny Hendrickson	PTS	8	8 March 1968	National Sporting Club, Piccadilly, London, United Kingdom	39.5–39.25
Win	3–4	(Saint Helena) Guinea Roger	PTS	10	28 November 1967	Afan Lido, Aberavon, United Kingdom	50–47.75
Win	12–9–3	(United Kingdom) Johnny Hendrickson	TKO	3	19 September 1967	Empire Pool, Wembley, London, United Kingdom	
Loss	24–3–1	(Republic of Ireland) John "Young" McCormack	TKO	7	19 June 1967	National Sporting Club, Piccadilly, London, United Kingdom	BBBofC British Light Heavyweight Title
Loss	4–5	(United Kingdom) Ernie Field	TKO	2	30 January 1967	Midland Hotel, Manchester, United Kingdom	
Win	33–16–6	(Tonga) Johnny Halafihi	PTS	8	7 December 1966	Afan Lido, Port Talbot, United Kingdom	
Win	8–8–2	(United Kingdom) Johnny Ould	TKO	4	26 October 1966	National Sporting Club, Piccadilly, London, United Kingdom	
Win	3–2	(United Kingdom) Ernie Field	PTS	8	19 September 1966	Midland Hotel, Manchester, United Kingdom	
Loss	15–4–2	(United Kingdom) Derek Richards	PTS	10	12 July 1966	Afan Lido, Port Talbot, United Kingdom	BBBofC Welsh Light Heavyweight Title
Win	10–10	(Guinea) Clarence Prince	TKO	2	6 June 1966	National Sporting Club, Piccadilly, London, United Kingdom	
Win	16–12–3	(United Kingdom) "Stunning" Steve Richards	TKO	4	11 May 1966	Midland Hotel, Manchester, United Kingdom	
Win	8–9–1	(Jamaica) Lloyd Walford	TKO	7	19 April 1966	National Sporting Club, Piccadilly, London, United Kingdom	
Win	4–4–1	(Jamaica) Charlie "The War" Wilson	TKO	1	4 April 1966	National Sporting Club, Piccadilly, London, United Kingdom	
Win	4–3–1	(Jamaica) Charlie "The War" Wilson	PTS	8	28 February 1966	National Sporting Club, Piccadilly, London, United Kingdom	
Win	7–8–1	(Jamaica) Lloyd Walford	TKO	6	10 January 1966	National Sporting Club, Piccadilly, London, United Kingdom	
Win	14–20–3	(Grenada) Joe "Dinner" Bell	PTS	8	26 April 1965	National Sporting Club, Piccadilly, London, United Kingdom	
Win	13–29–1	(Trinidad and Tobago) Fitzroy Lindo	TKO	7	8 March 1965	National Sporting Club, Piccadilly, London, United Kingdom	
Win	9–14–1	(United Kingdom) Syd Brown	TKO	5	1 February 1965	National Sporting Club, Piccadilly, London, United Kingdom	
Win	4–11–2	(United Kingdom) "Rob" Roy Thomas	TKO	6	20 January 1965	Sophia Gardens, Cardiff, United Kingdom	
Win	26–15–2	(United Kingdom) Tony French	PTS	6	14 December 1964	National Sporting Club, Piccadilly, London, United Kingdom	
Win	20–13–1	(United Kingdom) George Palin	KO	1	1 December 1964	Empire Pool, Wembley, London, United Kingdom	
Win	4–5	(Nigeria) Louis Onwuna	KO	2	16 November 1964	Midland Hotel, Manchester, United Kingdom	
Win	13–27–1	(Trinidad and Tobago) Fitzroy Lindo	PTS	8	2 November 1964	Ebbw Vale Indoor Cricket Hall, Ebbw Vale, United Kingdom	
Win	3–3	(United Kingdom) Gary Chippendale	TKO	4	12 October 1964	Free Trade Hall, Manchester, United Kingdom	
Win	4–5	(United Kingdom) Jimmy Stewart	KO	1	21 September 1964	Midland Hotel, Manchester, United Kingdom	
Win	3–3	(Nigeria) Louis Onwuna	PTS	6	20 July 1964	Ebbw Vale Indoor Cricket Hall, Ebbw Vale, United Kingdom	
Win	9–12–1	(United Kingdom) Syd Brown	PTS	8	22 June 1964	National Sporting Club, Piccadilly, London, United Kingdom	
Win	7–3	(United Kingdom) Dave "Tom" Arnold	KO	4	20 May 1964	National Sporting Club, Piccadilly, London, United Kingdom	
Win	3–2–1	(United Kingdom) "Union" Jack Powell	PTS	6	12 May 1964	Empire Pool, Wembley, London, United Kingdom	
Win	2–0	(Republic of Ireland) Henry Turkington	TKO	4	24 March 1964	Empire Pool, Wembley, London, United Kingdom	
Win	8–9	(United Kingdom) Syd Brown	PTS	8	24 February 1964	National Sporting Club, Piccadilly, London, United Kingdom	
Loss	16–25–4	(United Kingdom) "Average" Joe Somerville	PTS	6	9 December 1963	National Sporting Club, Piccadilly, London, United Kingdom	
Win	16–24–4	(United Kingdom) "Average" Joe Somerville	PTS	6	25 November 1963	National Sporting Club, Piccadilly, London, United Kingdom	
Win	--	(United Kingdom) Ray Fallone	PTS	6	22 October 1963	National Sporting Club, Piccadilly, London, United Kingdom	
Win	5–21–1	(United Kingdom) Terry Phillips "66"	PTS	6	20 August 1963	Coney Beach Arena, Porthcawl, United Kingdom	
Win	3–0	(United Kingdom) Dave "Tom" Arnold	PTS	6	1 July 1963	National Sporting Club, Piccadilly, London, United Kingdom	

== See also ==
- List of British light-heavyweight boxing champions
