= Richard Dunn Sports Centre =

Municipal Grade II listed building in Bradford, England

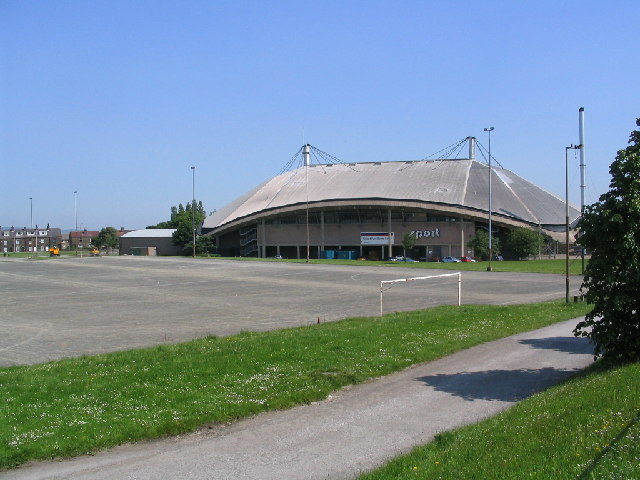
- Richard Dunn Sports Centre
- Interactive map of the Richard Dunn Sports Centre area

General information
- Architectural style: Brutalist
- Location: Bradford, England
- Coordinates: 53°46′00″N 1°45′32″W
- Construction started: 1974
- Completed: 1978
- Cost: £1,500,000 in 1974
- Client: Bradford Council

Technical details
- Structural system: concrete edge beams, steel cable-stayed roof

Design and construction
- Architects: Trevor Skempton

Listed Building – Grade II
- Designated: 5 April 2022
- Reference no.: 1480179
- Engineer: White, Young and partners
- Main contractor: Alfred McAlpine

The Richard Dunn Sports Centre is a 20th-century former sports centre in Odsal, an area of the city of Bradford in West Yorkshire, England. It is a Grade II listed building featuring a distinctive Brutalist tent shaped concrete roof.

== History ==
Plans for the building were started in 1970 when Bradford’s city architect recruited final year architecture student Trevor Skempton to produce a feasibility study for a new sports centre. The proposed location at Odsal was previously a quarry which had since been used as a landfill site.

Skempton's concept was inspired by Japan's Yoyogi National Gymnasium, designed by Kenzo Tange and by German architect Frei Otto’s tensile structures.

The design was an early example of computer aided design, using the Genesys Frame Analysis 2 computer programme to analyse data from wind tunnel testing which had been done on a 100th scale model.

Construction was completed in 1978 and after initially being know as the Odsal Big Top, the building was officially named after local boxer Richard Dunn.

== As a sports centre ==
The centre opened in 1978 and featured a large leisure pool, multiple use sports hall with terraced seating, a climbing wall, squash courts, a shooting range, cafe, bar and events room.

The building operated as the main leisure centre for central Bradford for over 40 years until its closure in 2019 by Bradford Council due to the cost of its upkeep. The council initially planned to demolish the building but this was prevented by a successful campaign by the 20th Century Society to give it listed status due to its architectural significance. It was officially listed as a Grade II Listed Building on 5 April 2022, in a decision described as "somewhat surprising" due to the recent rejection of the Arndale House, which was in a similar situation.

== After closure ==
During the COVID-19 pandemic, the building was used as a temporary morgue.

In September 2024, plans were created to convert the entire building into an Olympic standard national skateboarding hub called The Dunn. The plans, created in collaboration with the 20th Century Society, would convert the swimming pool into a 555m² concrete skating bowl and feature a 1,475m² arena along with other facilities.

Also in September 2024, the building was used as a filming location for the film 28 Years Later: The Bone Temple. During its opening scenes, the film features characters fighting in the empty swimming pool and exiting into the building's car park.

== See also ==
- Listed buildings in Bradford (Wibsey Ward)
