= Peter Boddington =

English boxer (1942–2020)

Personal information
- Nationality: British
- Born: Peter Boddington; October 1, 1942 Coventry, England
- Died: 19 December 2020 (aged 78) Coventry, England
- Weight: Heavyweight

Boxing career
- Stance: Southpaw

Boxing record
- Total fights: 22
- Wins: 18
- Win by KO: 15
- Losses: 4
- Draws: 0
- No contests: 0

Peter Boddington (1 October 1942 – 19 December 2020) was a British boxer.

He was the Amateur Boxing Association 1967 heavyweight champion and subsequently a professional boxer. Boddington was member of his local boxing club, Rootes ABC. He went to Whitley Abbey Comprehensive School in Whitley, Coventry.

== Boxing career ==
=== Amateur ===
Boddington became the British amateur heavyweight boxing champion winning his title in the 80th Amateur Boxing Association Championships at the Wembley Arena, Wembley, London on 5 May 1967.

Boddington won a silver medal in the 20th European Amateur Boxing Championships in Rome (25 May - 2 June 1967) having a weight of 91 kg.

=== Professional ===
Boddington turned professional in September 1967, running his record up to 12-0 with 11 KOs by March 1969. He then started the tail end of his career, losing 4 of his last 10 bouts - a points and TKO loss to Bunny Johnson, a KO by Paul Cassidy, and a TKO by Mike Schutte to close Boddington's career in his only fight outside the UK, which took place in Johannesburg, South Africa on 2 September 1972.

== Professional boxing record ==
18 Wins (15 knockouts, 3 decisions), 4 Losses (3 knockouts, 1 decisions)
Result	Record	Opponent	Type	Round	Date	Location	Notes
Loss	9-0	(South Africa) Mike Schutte	TKO	1	02/09/1972	Johannesburg, South Africa	
Win	10-9-2	(United Kingdom) Brian Jewitt	PTS	8	01/02/1972	Bull Ring Sporting Club, Birmingham, England	
Loss	23-6	(Jamaica) Bunny Johnson	TKO	4	09/11/1971	Wolverhampton, England	
Win	9-15-1	(United Kingdom) Paul Cassidy	TKO	5	22/09/1971	Midlands Sporting Club, Solihull, England	
Win	9-7-2	(United Kingdom) Brian Hall	KO	2	28/04/1971	Midlands Sporting Club, Solihull, England	
Loss	8-14-1	(United Kingdom) Paul Cassidy	KO	2	17/03/1971	Midlands Sporting Club, Solihull, England	
Win	2-0	(United Kingdom) Dave Hallinan	TKO	6	10/11/1970	Empire Pool, London, England	
Win	14-10-3	(Wales) Dennis Avoth	PTS	8	08/09/1970	Empire Pool, London, England	
Win	12-10	(Saint Kitts and Nevis) Rudolph Vaughan	TKO	5	01/06/1969	Hilton Hotel, London, England	
Loss	10-2	(Jamaica) Bunny Johnson	PTS	8	25/03/1969	Empire Pool, London, England	
Win	6-14-2	(Jamaica) Charlie Wilson	TKO	4	24/02/1969	Hilton Hotel, London, England	
Win	9-3	(Scotland) Terry Feeley	TKO	3	12/11/1968	Empire Pool, London, England	
Win	5-9-2	(United Kingdom) George Dulaire	TKO	5	11/10/1968	Hilton Hotel, London, England	
Win	9-5	(Trinidad and Tobago) Ulric Regis	TKO	4	18/09/1968	Empire Pool, London, England	
Win	16-15-3	(Jamaica) Lloyd Walford	TKO	4	02/07/1968	Shoreditch Town Hall, London, England	
Win	6-10-1	(United Kingdom) Ernie Field	TKO	7	09/04/1968	Empire Pool, London, England	Referee stopped the bout at 2:42 of the seventh round.
Win	6-6	(United Kingdom) Obe Hepburn	KO	4	26/02/1968	(Nottinghamshire) Nottingham Ice Stadium, Nottingham, England	
Win	5-5-1	(United Kingdom) Tommy Woods	TKO	3	08/01/1968	(Nottinghamshire) Nottingham Ice Stadium, Nottingham, England	
Win	6-9-2	(Jamaica) Charlie Wilson	PTS	8	28/11/1967	(Nottinghamshire) Victoria Baths, Nottingham, England	
Win	3-12-4	(United Kingdom) Barry Rodney	TKO	2	07/11/1967	Empire Pool, London, England	
Win	0-1-1	(United Kingdom) "Boxing" Bert Johnson	TKO	2	10/10/1967	(Nottinghamshire) Victoria Baths, Nottingham, England	
Win	11-8-3	(United Kingdom) Jim McIlvaney	TKO	2	06/09/1967	De Montford Hall, Leicester, England	Referee stopped the bout at 2:35 of the second round.
