= Tim Wood (boxer) =

English boxer (1951–2010)

Personal information
- Nationality: British
- Born: 10 August 1951 Camden Town, London, England
- Died: September 2010 (aged 59) Leicester, England
- Weight: Heavyweight, light heavyweight

Boxing career

Boxing record
- Total fights: 31
- Wins: 19
- Win by KO: 7
- Losses: 11
- Draws: 1

Tim Wood (10 August 1951 – September 2010) was a British boxer who was British light heavyweight champion between 1976 and 1977.

== Early life ==
Born in Camden Town, in North London, Wood moved with his family to Leicester when he was 14, and joined Belgrave Amateur Boxing Club.

== Boxing career ==
Wood was a successful amateur boxer, winning the ABA heavyweight title in 1972. He wasn't selected for the 1972 Summer Olympics in Munich, which led to a media campaign against the decision.

He turned professional and was trained by his father Arthur and Jim Knight in the gym at the Jolly Angler pub on Wharf Street in Leicester, and was managed by Johnny Griffin and later Carl Gunns. From his first nine pro fights Wood win eight and drew one. In January 1974 he met Les Stevens for the vacant BBBofC Southern Area heavyweight title, suffering his first professional defeat on points. Defeats to Eddie Neilson and Richard Dunn followed.

Griffin saw Wood as a better prospect at light heavyweight and encouraged him to slim down to that weight. Wood won his first four fights of 1975, including wins over Victor Attivor and Baby Boy Rolle, before losing in a final eliminator for the British light heavyweight title to Roy John by only half a point. He beat Johnny Wall in February 1976 to take the Southern Area light heavyweight title, and two months later faced Phil Martin for the vacant British title. Wood won narrowly on points to become British champion. Wood lost his title in March 1977 when he was knocked out in the first round by Bunny Johnson.

Wood continued to fight until 1979 but never fought for another title.

== Death ==
Tim Wood died in September 2010 after suffering a heart attack at the age of 59. He was survived by his widow Maureen and four children.
