= Eder Kurti =

British boxer

Personal information
- Nationality: (United Kingdom) British (Albania) Albanian
- Born: October 29, 1984 (age 41)
- Height: 6 ft 1 in (1.85 m)
- Weight: Super Middleweight

Boxing career
- Stance: Orthodox

Boxing record
- Total fights: 20
- Wins: 14
- Win by KO: 2
- Losses: 6
- Draws: 0

Eder Kurti (born 29 October 1984) is a British professional boxer with Albanian heritage who competes in the supper middleweight division currently residing in Woolwich, London.

Kurti turned pro in 2004 and in June 2010 Kurti was a reserve for the Super-Middleweights prizefighter competition at York Hall, Bethnal Green.

Alongside flyweight Ashley Sexton, Kurti is trained by Paul Reese at the Monster Gym in Cheshunt and is managed by London Promoter Michael Helliet.

On St George's day, 23 April 2009, Eder Kurti defeated Mark Phillips at a Dinner Show hosted by the Mayfair Sporting Club at the Milenium Hotel in Mayfair.

On 11 September at the York Hall Kurti won by KO against ‘Dangerous’ Danny Goode who failed to beat the count after being floored by a right hand to the body in the third round.

== Professional boxing record ==
14 Wins (2 knockouts, 10 decisions, 1 disqualification), 6 Losses (1 knockout, 5 decisions), 0 Draws
Res.	Record	Opponent	Type	Rd., Time	Date	Location	Notes
Loss	14–6	(England) Darren Codona	PTS	6	2013-03-08	Coronet Theatre, Southwark, London, England	
Win	14–5	(England) Louis Byrne	PTS	4	2012-11-29	Millennium Hotel, Mayfair, London, England	
Loss	13–5	(England) Iain Jackson	PTS	6	2011-10-20	Millennium Hotel, Mayfair, London, England	
Win	13–4	(England) Jody Miekle	PTS	4	2011-06-04	York Hall, Bethnal Green, London, England	
Win	12–4	(England) Jamie Norkett	PTS	4	2011-03-05	York Hall, Bethnal Green, London, England	
Win	11–4	(England) Danny Goode	TKO	3 (4)	2010-09-11	York Hall, Bethnal Green, London, England	
Win	10–4	(Latvia) Alex Spitko	PTS	4	2010-06-20	York Hall, Bethnal Green, London, England	
Win	9–4	(England) James Tucker	PTS	4	2010-04-24	York Hall, Bethnal Green, London, England	
Win	8–4	(England) Matt Scriven	PTS	4	2009-11-05	The Troxy, Limehouse, London, England	
Win	7–4	(Wales) Luke Osman	PTS	4	2009-06-12	York Hall, Bethnal Green, London, England	
Win	6–4	(Wales) Mark Phillips	PTS	6	2009-04-23	Millennium Hotel, Mayfair, London, England	
Win	5–4	(England) Kenroy Lambert	PTS	6	2009-01-29	Connaught Rooms, Holborn, London, England	
Loss	4–4	(England) Craig Denton	PTS	4	2007-11-18	Leisure Centre, Tooting, London, England	
Loss	4–3	(England) Greg Barton	PTS	4	2007-02-18	York Hall, Bethnal Green, London, England	
Win	4–2	(England) David Pearson	PTS	6	2006-12-02	Elephant & Castle Centre, Southwark, London, England	
Loss	3–2	(England) Stuart Brookes	PTS	6	2006-10-06	Empress Ballroom, Mexborough, Yorkshire, England	
Loss	3–1	(England) J. J. Ojuederie	TKO	4 (6)	2005-11-19	Elephant & Castle Centre, Southwark, London, England	
Win	3–0	(England) Ojay Abrahams	PTS	6	2005-01-27	Cafe Royal, Piccadilly, London, England	
Win	2–0	(Scotland) Craig Lynch	DQ	4 (4)	2004-12-02	Crystal Palace National Sports Centre, London, England	
Win	1–0	(Brazil) Cafu Santos	TKO	1 (6)	2004-11-04	Cafe Royal, Piccadilly, London, England	Kurti's professional debut
