= Phil Martin (boxer) =

English boxer (1950–1994)

Personal information
- Nationality: (England) English
- Born: Philip Martin Adelagan; 5 April 1950 Moss Side, Manchester, England
- Died: 27 May 1994 (aged 44)
- Weight: Light-heavyweight

Boxing career

Boxing record
- Total fights: 20
- Wins: 14
- Win by KO: 6
- Losses: 6
- Draws: 0
- No contests: 0

Phil Martin (aka Philip Martin Adelagan) (5 April 1950 – 27 May 1994) was an English professional light-heavyweight boxer. He fought during the 1970s with career statistics of won 14 (KO 6) and lost 6 (KO 4).

== Early life ==
Martin was born in Moss Side, Manchester, England, on 5 April 1950.

== Boxing career ==
He had a record of 14 wins and six defeat. The highlight of his career was beating former British Light Heavyweight Champion Gypsy Johnny Frankham over 10 rounds at Belle Vue, Greater Manchester, in November 1975. His professional career ended when he retired after the Ennio Cometti fight in 1978.

Martin went on to become a successful boxing trainer, after meeting with Chet Alexander who convinced him to return to a career in boxing. Before this Martin had become involved in left-wing political activism, which he was frustrated with, and he moved enthusiastically back into the sport, in the role of a trainer, working at the Alexander Foundation on Princess Road in Moss Side, Manchester. After taking classes in training at the Alexander Foundation, he set up his own gym in a disused building in Princess Road, Moss Side (in an area that had seen rioting in 1981), which he named the 'Champs Camp Gym', where he guided numerous boxers, such as Tony Ekubia, Frank Grant, Maurice Core, Ossie Maddix, Ensley Bingham and Steve Walker, to British European and Commonwealth title contests.

== Death ==
Martin died on 27 May 1994 from the effects of cancer at the age of 44. The Champ Camp Gym was renamed the Phil Martin Centre in his honour.

== Professional record ==
Record
Won 14 (KOs 6)	Lost 6	Drawn 0	Total 20

Date	Opponent	Location	Result
1974-12-02	Pat Thompson	London, England	W tko 7
1974-12-09	Steve Walker	Manchester, England	W KO 1
1975-01-13	Harry White	Nottingham, England	L Pts 6
1975-02-05	George Gray	Salford, England	W KO 7
1975-02-17	Tony Allen	Manchester, England	W Pts
1975-03-19	Frank Lucas	London, England	W tko 4
1975-04-17	Pat Thompson	Caister-on-Sea, England	W Pts
1975-04-29	Pat Thompson	Salford, England	W Pts
1975-06-30	Pat Thompson	Glasgow, Scotland	W Rtd
1975-11-11	Johnny Frankham	Manchester, England	W Pts
1976-01-19	Danny Fontillio	London, England	W Pts
1976-02-11	Carl Watson	Bradford, England	W Pts
1976-04-28	Tim Wood vacant British light heavyweight title	London, England	L Pts 15
1976-12-14	Bunny Johnson	West Bromwich, England	L tko 10
1977-02-25	Michel Dylbaytis	Saint-Nazaire, France	W Pts
1977-04-23	Jannick Dufour	France	W tko 3
1977-09-05	Rab Affleck	London, England	L tko 3
1977-10-06	Harald Skog	Copenhagen, Denmark	W Pts
1977-12-12	Louis Pergaud	Hamburg, Germany	L tko 5
1978-07-01	Ennio Cometti	Milan, Italy	L KO 7
