= Happy Pieterse =

South African boxer

Personal information
- Nationality: (South Africa) South African
- Born: Jan Happy Pieterse; 28 May 1942 South Africa
- Died: 26 May 2013 (aged 70) Alberton, Gauteng, South Africa
- Weight: Light Heavyweight

Boxing career

Boxing record
- Total fights: 22
- Wins: 17
- Win by KO: 0
- Losses: 5
- Draws: 0
- No contests: 0

Jan Happy Pieterse (28 May 1942 – 26 May 2013 in Alberton, Gauteng, South Africa) was a South African boxer. His professional record includes 22 fights: 17 wins, and 5 losses (3 knockouts).

He died on 26 May 2013, at age 70.

== Career ==
In 1963, Pieterse won the light-middleweight title at the South African amateur championships, before turning professional in July 1965 and stopping Boet de Bruyn in the fourth round.

His last fight was in February 1970 against Sarel Aucamp, to whom he lost the national title.
