= Grosvenor House =

Townhouse in London, demolished 1920

Coordinates: 51°30′35.2″N 0°9′19.7″W

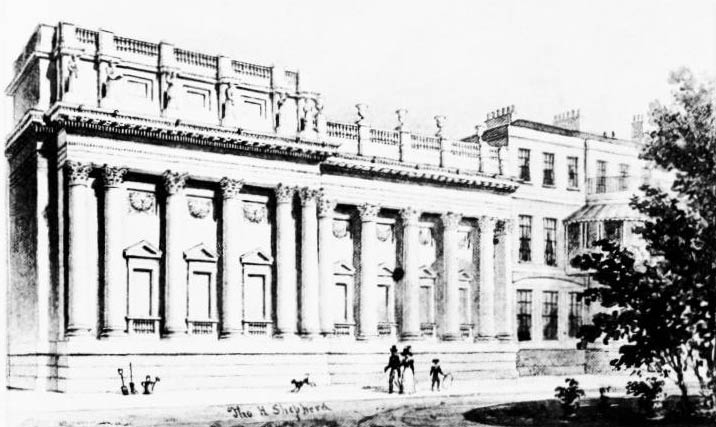
Grosvenor House, c. 1828.

Grosvenor House, front screen viewed from Upper Grosvenor Street. The two pedimented archways either end of the screen are reproduced on the roof of the 1920s Grosvenor House Hotel which now stands on the site.

Grosvenor House was one of the largest townhouses in London, home of the Grosvenor family (the family of the Dukes of Westminster) for more than a century. Their original London residence was on Millbank, but after the family had developed their Mayfair estates, they moved to Park Lane to build a house worthy of their wealth, status and influence in the 19th century. The house gave its name to Upper Grosvenor Street and Grosvenor Square.

The house was requisitioned during the First World War, and was sold and demolished in the 1920s. The Grosvenor House Hotel was built on its site.

== History ==
=== Nineteenth century ===
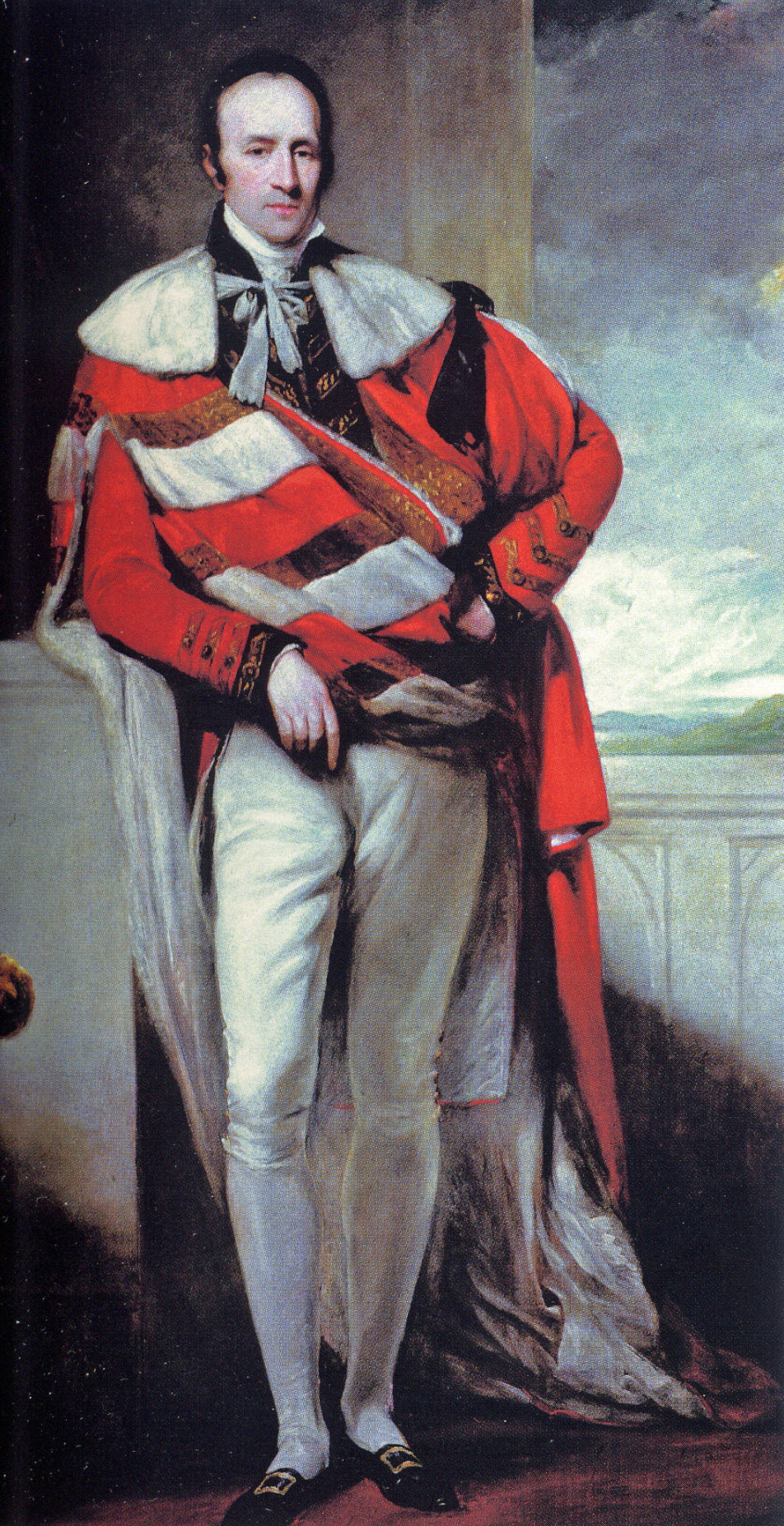
Robert Grosvenor, 1st Marquess of Westminster (d. 1845), purchaser of Grosvenor House in 1805.

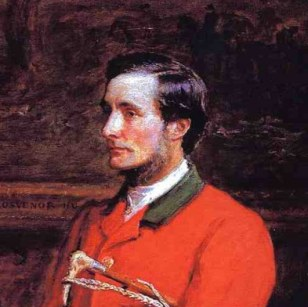
Hugh Grosvenor, 1st Duke of Westminster (d. 1899), who did much to extend Grosvenor House.

The site was originally occupied by a small house named 'Gloucester House' (after Prince William Henry, Duke of Gloucester and Edinburgh, who owned it), with the front entrance on Upper Grosvenor Street. This house was purchased by Robert Grosvenor, 1st Marquess of Westminster, in 1805 for £20,000. He spent £17,000 on extending the house to make it more fashionable. In 1821, a large picture gallery 50 feet (15 m) long was added to the west of the house. It was here that many of the Grosvenor family's treasures were held.

Another extension was added in 1842, in the form of a 110-foot (34 m) long classical-style colonnaded entrance screen on Upper Grosvenor Street. At each end was a triumphal arch with pediments above sculpted with the Grosvenor arms. Thomas Cundy, the architect of this vast house, then proposed a larger mansion to go all the way along to Park Street, extending all the way to 230 feet (70 m). This idea was dropped, as the 2nd Marquess thought it would be too lavish.

In 1870, Hugh Grosvenor, 3rd Marquess of Westminster (later the 1st Duke) commissioned Henry Clutton to add a porte-cochère to the north, and he had many of the state rooms redesigned. In 1889, electricity was introduced, being one of the first buildings in London to do so.

=== Twentieth century ===
Following the death of Hugh Grosvenor, 1st Duke of Westminster in December 1899, Grosvenor House was inherited by his grandson Hugh Grosvenor, 2nd Duke of Westminster. The 2nd Duke continued to maintain the house as his London residence prior to the outbreak of World War I in 1914.

==== Wartime use ====
By December 1916 the House had ceased to be used as a private residence, and was requisitioned by the British Government as offices for sections of the Ministry of Food.

==== Sale and demolition ====
Following the conclusion of the War the 2nd Duke did not resume occupation of Grosvenor House; in 1917 he had taken up residence at another another Grosvenor Estate property, Bourdon House on Davies Street in Mayfair, which would remain as his London home until his death in 1953.

Following the 2nd Duke's decision not to return to Grosvenor House, his second-cousin George Sutherland-Leveson-Gower, 5th Duke of Sutherland reportedly expressed some interest in purchasing the lease, but it was instead eventually rented to the Dowager Lady Michelham in 1919. In 1924 the lease of Grosvenor House was purchased by William Lever, 1st Viscount Leverhulme who planned to turn the property into a National Art Gallery; however his death in 1925 prevented this. Grosvenor House was later demolished in 1927 and replaced by the Grosvenor House Hotel, which opened in 1929.

== Art collections ==
It is said that the home originally housed one of the best private art collections in the world, with paintings by Gainsborough, Velázquez and other old masters. Some of these were sold between the wars, but most remain in the other Grosvenor family homes, mainly their country seat - Eaton Hall in Cheshire.

== See also ==
- List of demolished buildings and structures in London

== Sources ==
- Walford, Edward. Old & New London: A Narrative of Its History, Its People & Its Places, 6 vols., London, 1881, vol 4, pp. 370–372.
- Young, John. A Catalogue of the Pictures at Grosvenor House, London; with etchings from the whole collection ... accompanied by historical notices of the principal works. London, 1820.
