= Mayfair Sporting Club =

Michael Helliet Management
- Industry: Corporate entertainment
- Founded: 2003 (United Kingdom)
- Headquarters: London
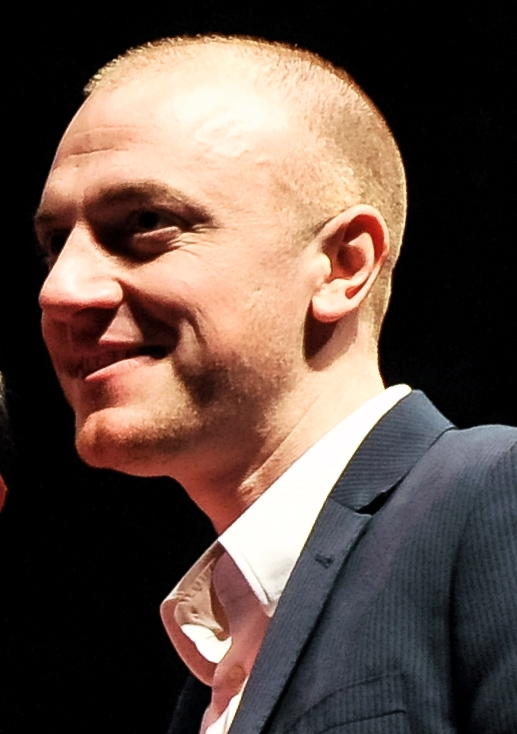
- Key people: Michael Helliet
- Website: http://www.mayfairsportingclub.com Mayfair Sporting Club

Mayfair Sporting Club organises professional black tie boxing dinner events at venues such as the Cafe Royal in Regent Street, Millennium Hotel in Mayfair, the Savoy, The Marriott in Grosvenor Square and other five-star venues. During the event there is champagne reception and a three-course dinner followed by live professional boxing and an after-show party.

Mayfair Sporting Club was formed by Michael Helliet in 2003. The first event was held on 18 September 2003 at the London Marriott. On 4 November 2004 Mayfair Sporting Club organised an event in support of ex-boxers' charity Triumph over Adversity with Former at the Cafe Royal. World Lightweight Champion and the charity's founder Colin Dynamo Dunne was the guest of honour. Events have also been organised in partnership with the National Sporting Club who have been credited with improving the integrity of the sport as well as introducing Queensberry Rules to professional boxing.

On 23 April, St George's day, 2009 an event was held at the Millennium hotel, fights included Bobby Gladman vs. Karl Taylor, Eder Kurti vs. Mark Phillips and Wayne Alwan-Arab vs. Paul Royston. Bobby Gladman, Eder Kurti and Wayne Alwan Arab are currently managed by Michael Helliet.
