= Paul Sykes (boxer) =

British boxer (1946–2007)

Personal information
- Nationality: British
- Born: Paul Sykes; 23 May 1946 Wakefield, England
- Died: 7 March 2007 (aged 60) Wakefield, England
- Height: 6 ft 3 in (191 cm)
- Weight: Heavyweight

Boxing career
- Stance: Orthodox

Boxing record
- Total fights: 10
- Wins: 6
- Win by KO: 4
- Losses: 3
- Draws: 1

Paul Sykes (23 May 1946 – 7 March 2007) was a British professional boxer and weightlifter. A substantial portion of Sykes' adulthood was spent inside prison, where he became notorious as one of the most difficult prisoners in the country.

In 1979, he engaged in a consequential match against John L. Gardner, as he competed for the British and Commonwealth heavyweight titles.

== Early life ==
Born on Thursday, 23 May 1946 in Wakefield, West Riding of Yorkshire, Paul Sykes was the son of Walter Sykes and Betty Barlow. He spent his upbringing in Lupset Council Estate, where he embraced boxing at the age of 7 as a member of the Robin Hood and Thorpe Amateur Boxing Club. He began heavy drinking at a young age. At 16, he journeyed to Germany for a fight but found himself carried out of a bar the night before the bout, leading to a defeat.

His initial encounter with the criminal justice system occurred when he was just 17 years old. During a prison term in 1971, he engaged in sparring sessions with Roger Tighe.

While serving a five-year sentence at HMP Walton, Sykes secured the opportunity to join the Maple Leaf Amateur Boxing Club in Bootle, which was overseen by a local magistrate. This arrangement allowed him to represent the North-Western Counties team in 1973 while on a temporary release, positioning him as a potential ABA heavyweight champion. His journey was halted when he was defeated in the semi-final of the championships that year by eventual victor Garfield McEwan.

Following his release from incarceration in 1973, Sykes took on the role of a lifeguard on Blackpool Beach.

== Boxing ==
Sykes experienced alcohol abuse and mental health issues and carried out both petty robberies and violent crime. During a brief period of rehabilitation, he fought ten bouts as a professional boxer between 1978 and 1980. On his release from prison in 1977, having unsuccessfully applied for a professional licence in 1973, he applied again, but the British Boxing Board of Control (BBBofC) insisted that he wait six months before receiving a licence, probably due to his prison record.

He finally made his professional debut in February 1978, beating Keith Steve Johnson via first-round retirement. In his second fight, he challenged Neil Malpass for the BBBofC Central Area heavyweight title, losing via disqualification after he was judged to have deliberately head-butted Malpass in the seventh round. After wins over Tommy Kiely and Neville Meade, he again challenged Malpass for the Central Area title. In July 1978, the fight ended in a draw. In his sixth fight, Sykes knocked American David Wilson unconscious and continued to hit him as he draped over the ropes before the referee managed to pull him away. Wilson suffered a brain haemorrhage, was put on a life support machine, and needed a month in the hospital to recover.

In June 1979, he challenged for John L. Gardner's British and Commonwealth titles at Wembley. Sykes prepared for the fight with three weeks of sparring with Leon Spinks in Michigan. The fight was stopped when Sykes was overwhelmed. Gardner was seven years younger than Sykes (Gardner referred to Sykes after the fight as "an old man"), and this was his thirty-first professional fight; in contrast, Sykes had entered the fight after just eight professional bouts. Sykes still holds the record for being the British Heavyweight title challenger with the fewest professional fights. After his release in 1978, he found himself in promotional photographs with Don King and Larry Holmes, and also travelled to the United States to stand in as a sparring partner for Leon Spinks. Sykes was a bodyguard to Alex Steene and sparred the future champion David Pearce. Paul Sykes said; David "Bomber" Pearce was the toughest and most ferocious fighter he faced during his boxing career based on the sparring that took place at the Waterloo Boxing Gym. Sykes, became good friends with Pearce and the Pearce boxing brothers. Sykes' manager, Tommy Miller, later said, "Paul could have gone right to the top, quite easily .. he impressed everybody", but "he was always in trouble one way or another, he'd always loads of worry on his mind." Sykes said of his ring career: "Boxing has been my salvation. It's the only sport which could have rescued me from my background."

His professional career ended in March 1980 when Nigerian heavyweight Ngozika Ekwelum knocked him out in the first round of a fight in Lagos, Nigeria.

It appeared that Sykes had been billed to fight Lenny McLean at London's Rainbow Theatre on 20 November 1979, but this fight never happened. Lenny Mclean, in his autobiography, later explained: "A week before the off, Sykes went into a club in Wakefield where he lives, got well pissed and had a ruck with four doormen. He did them all but one of them got lucky and put a cut above his eye that took eight stitches to pull together".

Sykes was jailed for five years in 1981 for taking out a contract on a union official from Blackpool. While in prison, he set records for lifting weights. He was the holder of the British amateur squat weightlifting record (deep knee bend, 500 lbs).

=== Professional results ===
10 fights	6 wins	3 losses
By knockout	4	2
By decision	2	0
By disqualification	0	1
Draws	1	

No.	Result	Record	Opponent	Type	Round, time	Date	Location	Notes
10	Loss	6—3—1 (4)	Ngozika Ekwelum	KO	1 (10)	29 March 1980	National Stadium, Indoor Sports Hall, Lagos, Nigeria	
9	Loss	6—2—1 (4)	John L. Gardner	TKO	6 (15)	26 June 1979	Empire Pool, Wembley, London	for British and Commonwealth heavyweight titles
8	Win	6—1—1 (4)	Conrad Tooker	PTS	10	13 February 1979	Theatre Club, Wakefield	
7	Win	5—1—1 (4)	Lisimo Obutobe	KO	6 (8)	24 October 1978	Tower Circus, Blackpool	
6	Win	4—1—1 (3)	Dave Wilson	TKO	3 (8)	4 September 1978	Theatre Club, Wakefield	
5	Draw	3—1—1 (3)	Neil Malpass		10	18 July 1978	Theatre Club, Wakefield	for BBBofC Central Area heavyweight title
4	Win	3—1—0 (2)	Neville Meade	TKO	5 (8)	15 May 1978	Yorkshire Executive S.C., Bradford	
3	Win	2—1—0 (1)	Tommy Kiely	PTS	8	17 April 1978	Norfolk Gardens Hotel, Bradford	
2	Loss	1—1—0 (1)	Neil Malpass	DQ	7 (10)	20 March 1978	Yorkshire Executive S.C., Bradford	for BBBofC Central Area heavyweight title
1	Win	1—0—0 (1)	Keith Steve Johnson	RTD	1 (8)	20 February 1978	Norfolk Gardens Hotel, Bradford	

== Prison ==
Sykes was classified as one of the most difficult prisoners in the UK throughout the 1970s and 1980s. By 1990, he had spent 21 out of 26 years in 18 prisons for many violent acts against prison officers and police officers. Sykes committed violent offences all over Northern England and was known to locals and the police in Leeds, Liverpool, Blackpool, Hull, and Rotherham.

Paul Sykes is mentioned in the book Legends by Charles Bronson, a guide to the men Bronson regarded as the toughest in Britain. Referring to him as 'Sykesy', Bronson describes him as "a legend, born and bred" and writes: "I first met Sykes in Liverpool in the early 70s and at that time he was probably the fittest con in Britain. A hard man from Yorkshire, a fighting man in every sense. A lot of people never liked him, perhaps they even feared him but I respected the man for what he stood for". Bronson then goes on to relate an incident said to have taken place in HMP Liverpool, when Sykes allegedly killed the prison's cat and fashioned it into a 'Davy Crockett' hat.

While in prison, Sykes earned a BA degree in Physical Sciences from the Open University and wrote a memoir, Sweet Agony (1988), which won the Arthur Koestler Award for prison literature.

== Later years ==
Following his release from HM Prison Hull in 1990, producer Roger Greenwood followed him in the course of filming the documentary Paul Sykes: At Large. Greenwood described Sykes as "a fascinating character and incredibly intelligent".

A further documentary explored Sykes's brief post-release career as a debt collector, a business venture he dubbed the 'Last Resort Debt Collecting Agency... "threatenergrams" a speciality', and which was utilised by Wakefield businessman Dennis Flint, who sent Sykes to collect debts in Spain in addition to funding his autobiography, Sweet Agony.

Sykes could not control his drinking. In 2000, Wakefield Council secured a two-year ASBO banning him from the city centre after a string of aggressive drunken incidents, including shouting abuse and urinating in public. He was arrested in August 2003 for violating the ban by making an appointment with an optician in Wakefield, but was released on his own recognisance.

== Personal life ==
Paul Sykes has at least 6 children; two are serving life sentences for murder. Paul Leighton Sykes is serving a life sentence for stabbing Michael Gallagher to death in a sudden knife attack in Lupset, Wakefield, in June 2004. In 2008, 25-year-old Michael Sharp (who doesn't appear in the documentary, Paul Sykes at large, having grown up with his mother elsewhere in Wakefield) was given a minimum 27-year sentence at Leeds Crown Court for murdering 38-year-old David Ward, a former police officer, following a botched armed robbery at his home on Denby Dale Road in Wakefield.

== Death ==
Sykes died on 7 March 2007 at Pinderfields Hospital, Wakefield. His cause of death was noted as pneumonia and liver cirrhosis. His death certificate states his occupation as 'author (retired)', and the funeral service was held at Wakefield Baptist Church, which he regularly attended. He is buried in the Alverthorpe cemetery in Wakefield.

== Media ==
=== Books ===
Sykes released an autobiography Sweet Agony in 1988 which won an Koestler Award the same year. Writer Jamie Boyle has written three books about Sykes, which have been published in 2017 and 2020.

- Boyle, Jamie (2017) Sykes: Unfinished Agony, Warcry Press, ISBN 9780995531246
- Boyle, Jamie (2017) Further Agony: One More Round with Sykes, Warcry Press, ISBN 9780995531260
- Brenton, Rob (2018) ''It's...Sharks: Paul Sykes & The Straits of Johor, Warcry Press, ISBN 9781912543137
- Boyle, Jamie (2020) Final Agony: The Previously Untold Stories of Paul Sykes, Warcry Press, ISBN 9781912543342

=== Film ===
The film rights to Sykes' book were acquired in 2017 by Western Edge Pictures, and as of 2019 the film is still in development.
