= Albert Syben =

Belgian boxer

Albert Syben (born 1 July 1951) is a Belgian former professional boxer who competed from 1977 to 1986. He challenged for the European heavyweight title twice between 1982 and 1983, and held the Belgian heavyweight title twice between 1979 and 1982.

== Biography ==
Albert Syben was born and grew up in Cheratte, Liège, Belgium. He fought for his first title in 1979, facing Rudy Gauwe in Lokeren, his opponent's hometown, in front of 6,000 people. He defeated Gauwe to become the new Belgian heavyweight champion. Syben successfully defended the title against Robert Desnouck on 13 October 1979. On 14 December 1979, he lost his title in a rematch against Gauwe in Brussels.

Syben regained the Belgium heavyweight title by defeating Gauwe in their third bout on 17 April 1981. He later challenged two times for the European heavyweight title, being defeated twice by Lucien Rodriguez, in 1982 and 1983.

On 1 June 1979, Syben faced Muhammad Ali in a 6-round exhibition bout.

== Professional boxing record ==
51 fights	37 wins	12 losses
By knockout	16	7
By decision	21	5
Draws	2	

No.	Result	Record	Opponent	Type	Round	Date	Location	Notes
51	Loss	37–12-2	(Zimbabwe) Proud Kilimanjaro	TKO	4 (6)	1986-05-16	Royal Albert Hall, Abidjan, Ivory Coast	
50	Loss	37–11-2	(United Kingdom) Dave Garside	PTS	8	1986-03-20	Winter Gardens, Blackpool, England	
49	Loss	37–10-2	(France) Anaclet Wamba	PTS	8	1985-12-25	Saint-Brieuc, France	
48	Loss	37–9-2	(France) Safir Digibele	PTS	8	1979-12-14	Izegem, Belgium	
47	Win	37–8-2	(Democratic Republic of the Congo) Ibelo Moano	PTS	8	1985-12-02	Liège, Belgium	
46	Loss	36–8-2	(Brazil) Adilson Rodrigues	TKO	6 (10)	1985-10-06	Ginásio Estadual do Ibirapuera, Sao Paulo, Brazil	
45	Loss	36–7-2	(Italy) Stefano Vassallo	PTS	8	1985-06-22	Sestri Levante, Italy	
44	Win	36–6-2	(United Kingdom) Steve Gee	PTS	8	1985-05-01	Molenbeek-Saint-Jean, Belgium	
43	Loss	35–6-2	(France) Lucien Rodriguez	TKO	8 (12)	1983-08-05	Les Arenes, Nimes, France	For European heavyweight title
42	Loss	35–5-2	(Wales) David Pearce	KO	1 (8)	1983-04-07	(England) Lyceum Ballroom, The Strand, London, United Kingdom	
41	Win	35–4-2	(Italy) Marco Vitagliano	TKO	2 (12)	1983-02-11	Bressoux, Belgium	
40	Loss	34–4-2	(Mali) Mary Konate	TKO	5	1982-10-20	(Belgium) Paris, France	
39	Loss	34–3-2	(France) Lucien Rodriguez	UD	12	1982-03-05	Stade Pierre de Coubertin, Paris, France	For European heavyweight title
38	Win	34–2-2	(Switzerland) Moussa Kassongo Mukandjo	TKO	5	1982-01-02	(Belgium) Kinshasa, Congo	
37	Win	33–2-2	(United Kingdom) Ricky James	PTS	8	1981-11-27	Molenbeek-Saint-Jean, Belgium	
36	Win	32–2-2	(Italy) Rinaldo Pelizzari	PTS	8	1981-10-23	Herve, Belgium	
35	Win	31–2-2	(Belgium) Rudy Gauwe	TKO	8 (12)	1981-04-17	Liège, Belgium	Won Belgium heavyweight title
34	Win	30–2-2	(Democratic Republic of the Congo) Pierre Babo Kabassu	PTS	10	1981-02-28	Etterbeek, Belgium	
33	Win	29–2-2	(United States) James Dixon	PTS	8	1980-12-19	Molenbeek-Saint-Jean, Belgium	
32	Loss	28–2-2	(Germany) Bernd August	TKO	8	1980-10-24	Molenbeek-Saint-Jean, Belgium	
31	Win	28–1-2	(Germany) George Butzbach	PTS	10	1980-09-19	Argenteau, Belgium	
30	Win	27–1-2	(Belgium) Jean-Pierre Coopman	PTS	10	1980-06-27	Molenbeek-Saint-Jean, Belgium	
29	Win	26–1-2	(Italy) Vasco Faustino	KO	3	1980-04-26	Molenbeek-Saint-Jean, Belgium	
28	Loss	25–1-2	(Belgium) Rudy Gauwe	KO	8 (12)	1979-12-14	Brussels, Belgium	Lost Belgium heavyweight title
27	Win	25–0-2	(Spain) Felipe Rodriguez	PTS	10	1979-11-10	Brussels, Belgium	
26	Win	24–0-2	(Belgium) Robert Desnouck	PTS	12	1979-10-13	Antwerp, Belgium	Defended Belgium heavyweight title
25	Win	23–0-2	(Algeria) Mohammed Galoul	PTS	8	1979-09-28	Molenbeek-Saint-Jean, Belgium	
24	Win	22–0-2	(United Kingdom) George Scott	PTS	10	1979-05-19	Cirque Royal, Brussels, Belgium	
23	Win	21–0-2	(Belgium) Rudy Gauwe	KO	3 (12)	1979-04-21	Lokeren, Belgium	Won Belgium heavyweight title
22	Win	20–0-2	(United Kingdom) Tony Moore	PTS	8	1979-04-06	Brussels, Belgium	
21	Win	19–0-2	(United Kingdom) Neville Meade	TKO	4 (10)	1979-01-19	Brussels, Belgium	
20	Win	18–0-2	(United States) Roy Wallace	PTS	10	1978-11-24	Liège, Belgium	
19	Draw	17–0-2	(Italy) Domenico Adinolfi	PTS	10	1978-10-13	Molenbeek-Saint-Jean, Belgium	
18	Win	17–0-1	(France) Jannick Dufour	KO	3 (10)	1978-06-24	Grivegnee, Belgium	
17	Win	16–0-1	(Netherlands) Hennie Thoonen	KO	4	1978-05-19	Molenbeek-Saint-Jean, Belgium	
16	Win	15–0-1	(France) Christian Poncelet	PTS	10	1978-04-01	Forest, Belgium	
15	Win	14–0-1	(Algeria) Mohammed Galoul	PTS	8	1978-03-18	Vivegnis, Belgium	
14	Win	13–0-1	(United Kingdom) Ishaq Hussein	KO	4 (8)	1978-02-25	Antwerp, Belgium	
13	Win	12–0-1	(France) Jean Pierre Leiseigneur	TKO	2	1978-02-11	Liège, Belgium	
12	Win	11–0-1	(Germany) Horst Lang	TKO	3 (8)	1978-01-06	Grivegnee, Belgium	
11	Win	10–0-1	(Italy) Ferrucio Mazzardi	TKO	6	1977-12-23	Molenbeek-Saint-Jean, Belgium	
10	Win	9–0-1	(Belgium) Fernand De Ruyter	KO	2	1977-12-09	La Louviere, Belgium	
9	Win	8–0-1	(Algeria) Mohammed Galoul	PTS	6	1977-11-26	Brussels, Belgium	
8	Win	7–0-1	(France) Laurent Zardy	PTS	6	1977-11-12	Verviers, Belgium	
7	Win	6–0-1	(Germany) Reinhard Tommy Seydock	KO	3 (6)	1977-10-28	Ougree, Belgium	
	Win	5–0-1	(Italy) Fausto Constantino	PTS	6	1977-10-15	Molenbeek-Saint-Jean, Belgium	
5	Win	4–0-1	(Democratic Republic of the Congo) Lisimo Obutobe	PTS	4 (10)	1977-10-08	Liège, Belgium	
4	Win	3–0-1	(Algeria) Tony Oudina	KO	2	1977-06-18	Grivegnee, Belgium	
3	Win	2–0-1	(France) Jean Belval	KO	2 (6)	1977-04-23	Wandre, Belgium	
2	Win	1–0-1	(France) Lassine Niare	PTS	6	1977-03-04	Grivegnee, Belgium	
1	Draw	0–0-1	(Italy) Fausto Constantino	PTS	6	1977-01-15	Brussels, Belgium	

== Exhibition boxing record ==
1 fight	0 wins	0 losses
Non-scored	1	

No.	Result	Record	Opponent	Type	Round, time	Date	Location	Notes
1	—N/a	0–0 (1)	(United States) Muhammad Ali	—N/a	6	1 June 1979	Sart Tilman, Liège, Belgium	
