= Horace Notice =

English boxer

Personal information
- Born: Horace G. Notice; 7 August 1957 (age 69) West Bromwich, England
- Height: 6 ft 1 1/2 in (1.87 m)
- Weight: heavyweight

Boxing career

Boxing record
- Total fights: 16
- Wins: 16 (KO 12)
- Losses: 0

Horace G. Notice (born 7 August 1957) is an English amateur and professional heavyweight boxer of the 1980s who as an amateur won the 1983 ABA Heavyweight Championship boxing out of the Nechells Green ABC (Birmingham).

As a professional, Notice won the British Boxing Board of Control (BBBofC) British heavyweight title, and Commonwealth heavyweight title, his professional fighting weight varied from 196 lb, to 212 lb. After defending both his British and Commonwealth heavyweight titles against Hughroy Currie, a retinal detachment prematurely ended his boxing career, and ruined his plans of a next defence. Notice said: "His only regrets were not fighting for a EBU title and facing the man that Frank Bruno avoided, David Pearce".

== Personal life ==
Notice lives in Hayes, South East London, with the actress Jacqui Gordon-Lawrence and their daughters, Naomi and Amelia. Singer and actress Michelle Gayle is godmother to one of their daughters.

== Professional boxing record ==
16 fights	16 wins	0 losses
By knockout	12	0
By decision	4	0

No.	Result	Record	Opponent	Type	Round, time	Date	Location	Notes
16	Win	16–0	Hughroy Currie	TKO	10 (12)	3 Sep 1988	York Hall, London, England	Retained British and Commonwealth heavyweight titles
15	Win	15–0	Dean Waters	TKO	4 (12)	2 Dec 1987	Grand Hall, London, England	Retained Commonwealth heavyweight title
14	Win	14–0	Paul Lister	KO	3 (12)	3 Nov 1987	Crowtree Leisure Centre, Sunderland, England	Retained British and Commonwealth heavyweight titles
13	Win	13–0	Dave Garside	TKO	5 (12)	26 May 1987	Wembley Arena, London, England	Retained British and Commonwealth heavyweight titles
12	Win	12–0	Proud Kilimanjaro	TKO	8 (12), 2:56	4 Mar 1987	Civic Hall, Dudley, England	Retained Commonwealth heavyweight title
11	Win	11–0	Mike Jameson	UD	10	7 May 1986	Royal Albert Hall, London, England	
10	Win	10–0	Hughroy Currie	TKO	6 (12), 1:50	12 Apr 1986	Palace Lido, Douglas, Isle of Man	Won British and vacant Commonwealth heavyweight titles
9	Win	9–0	Curtis Jones	KO	2 (8), 1:17	4 Mar 1986	Wembley Arena, London, England	
8	Win	8–0	Anaclet Wamba	PTS	8	16 Oct 1985	Royal Albert Hall, London, England	
7	Win	7–0	Noel Quarless	KO	7 (12), 2:37	26 Mar 1985	The Stadium, Liverpool, England	
6	Win	6–0	Bob Young	KO	2 (6), 1:45	27 Nov 1984	Wembley Arena, London, England	
5	Win	5–0	Winston Allen	PTS	6	27 Nov 1984	Wembley Arena, London, England	
4	Win	4–0	Paddy Finn	TKO	3 (8), 1:48	26 Oct 1984	Civic Hall, Wolverhampton, England	
3	Win	3–0	Andrew Gerrard	TKO	2 (6)	27 Apr 1984	Civic Hall, Wolverhampton, England	
2	Win	2–0	Theo Josephs	KO	1 (6)	30 Nov 1983	National Sporting Club, London, England	
1	Win	1–0	Andrew Gerrard	PTS	6	24 Oct 1983	Grosvenor House, London, England	
