= John L. Gardner (boxer) =

English boxer

John L. Gardner (born 19 March 1953) is a former British, Commonwealth, and European heavyweight champion. A stocky, game pressure fighter, his speed and aggression made him a marginal top ten contender for the world heavyweight title. Gardner was active in the late 1970s and early 1980s. His best arena was the British and European boxing scene.

== Early life and career ==
John Lewis Gardner was born in his hometown of Hackney, England. He won the North West London Heavyweight Championship as an amateur in 1973 and turned professional at age twenty. His managers were G. Steene and Terry Lawless.

== Professional boxer ==
Gardner won his first 24 fights in a row, remaining undefeated for almost five years, most of his fights won by TKO against a collection of British, European and American journeymen. He defeated Neville Meade, a future British Heavyweight Champion, and the fairly useful Bjorn Rudi and Ngozika Ekwelum during this period, before being caught cold in the first round in 1977 by Ibar Arrington (Gardner was a notoriously slow starter). However, he earned his first title shot that year in 1977 when he defeated Denton Ruddock by TKO for the Southern Area British Heavyweight Championship.

== British and Commonwealth Heavyweight Championship ==
Gardner, a contender for the vacant British and Commonwealth Heavyweight Championship in 1978, defeated Billy Aird by TKO for the title. Gardner then defeated Greg Sorrentini and the useful American contender Mike Koranicki. Afterwards, Gardner defended his title against the notorious Paul Sykes in 1979, winning by TKO after six rounds forcing his opponent to back down. Later that year, he vacated the title and lost a points decision to top contender Jimmy Young over ten rounds.

== European Heavyweight Championship ==
Gardner defeated Belgium's Rudy Gauwe by TKO in 1980 for the Vacant European Heavyweight Championship. Afterwards, Gardner knocked out European rated Italian Lorenzo Zanon in his first title defense in 1980 after five rounds. Gardner, who never lost a title fight during his career, vacated the title in hopes of a world title.

Gardner then defeated world rated Ossie Ocasio, the future world cruiserweight champion, in 1980 by KO after six rounds.

== Heavyweight contender ==
Gardner then signed a contract to fight Muhammad Ali, the legendary Heavyweight Champion of the World. The fighters were scheduled to fight in Hawaii, but Ali backed out of the deal, retiring. He did however in the late 1970s fight a televised three round exhibition with Ali in London. Ali clearly got the upper hand but it was interesting and a big moment for British fans. In 1981 Gardner traveled to Detroit, Michigan, to fight the fast moving top rated Michael Dokes.

Although Gardner had the better fighting record but against lesser opponents, Dokes was in his prime and the Englishman was knocked out after four rounds. Gardner soon retired at age 28, taking a year off before making an attempted comeback. He defeated American fringe fighters Ricky James and Lou Benson Jr before being knocked out in two rounds with Noel Quarless. Gardner retired in 1983 aged 31, with a record of 39 fights, 35 wins, 29 knockouts, and 4 losses during his boxing career.

== Personal life ==
Gardner used to own a pub in Gateshead, in which he was subject to a knife attack where he was stabbed 14 times. His wife was also slashed by a local drug dealer.

Gardner worked for Pitney Bowes selling mailing equipment.

== Exhibition boxing record ==
1 fight	0 wins	0 losses
Non-scored	1	

No.	Result	Record	Opponent	Type	Round, time	Date	Location	Notes
1	—	0–0 (1)	(United States) Muhammad Ali	—	4	May 29, 1979	(United Kingdom) Royal Albert Hall, London, England	Non-scored bout
