= Finlay Bealham =

Ireland international rugby union player

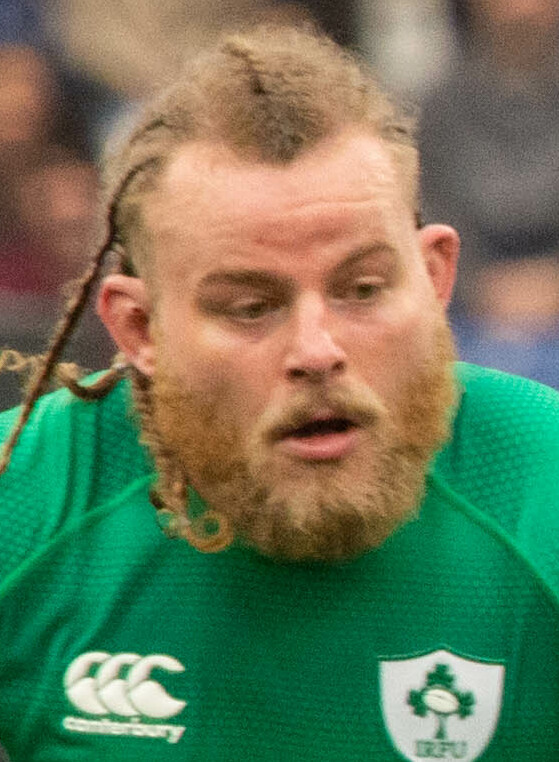
- Bealham representing Ireland during the 2023 Six Nations against Italy
- Full name: Finlay Harry Bealham
- Born: 9 October 1991 (age 35) Canberra, Australian Capital Territory, Australia
- Height: 1.88 m (6 ft 2 in)
- Weight: 118 kg (260 lb; 18 st 8 lb)
- School: St. Edmund's College
- Notable relative: Gordon Ferris (first cousin once removed)

Rugby union career
- Position: Prop
- Current team: Connacht
Senior career
Years	Team	Apps	(Points)
2014–	Connacht	227	(120)
- Correct as of 20 March 2026
International career
Years	Team	Apps	(Points)
2011	Ireland U20	4	(0)
2015	Emerging Ireland	2	(5)
2016–	Ireland	57	(15)
2025	British & Irish Lions	1	(0)
- Correct as of 14 March 2026

Finlay Harry Bealham (born 9 October 1991) is a professional rugby union player who plays as a prop for United Rugby Championship club Connacht. Born in Australia, he represents Ireland at international level after qualifying on ancestry grounds.

== Early life ==
Bealham grew up in Canberra. He attended St Edmund's College in the city. He played rugby league at a young age before concentrating solely on union from the age of 16.

Bealham was selected for the Australian schools team and represented their 'A' side. He was not given a spot in the Brumbies academy and instead moved to Ireland to start his professional career.

Bealham represents Ireland at international level, qualifying to play for them through his grandmother from Enniskillen in Northern Ireland. Through his grandmother, Bealham is related to Northern Irish heavyweight boxer Gordon Ferris.

== Club career ==
Bealham moved to Ireland in 2010 and initially played with the amateur side, Belfast Harlequins. Following the 2011 Junior World Cup, he was offered a place in the academy of Connacht, another province. Moving to the new province also meant moving clubs, with Bealham joining Galway Corinthians. Bealham was promoted from the sub-academy to the full academy ahead of the 2012–13 season.

While in the academy Bealham played for the province's second-tier side, the Connacht Eagles. Bealham made his full debut for Connacht in the 2013–14 Pro12 on 23 February 2014. He came on from the bench away to Italian side Zebre, replacing Denis Buckley at loosehead on the 74 minute mark. Bealham went on to make a further five replacement appearances in the Pro12 that season. In April 2014, it was announced that Bealham had signed a professional contract with the province to last until summer 2015, making him a full member of Connacht's senior squad.

In the 2014–15 season, Bealham was moved from loosehead to play tighthead by Connacht forwards coach Dan McFarland. Despite the change, he continued to play regularly for the side, as he had at the end of the previous season. Bealham made his European debut on 6 December 2014, coming on from the bench in the home game to Bayonne in the Challenge Cup pool stages. He made his first start in the reverse fixture the following week. Bealham made his first league start on 26 December 2014 against Ulster. During the course of the season he played 15 games in the 2014–15 Pro12, and made a total of five appearances in the Challenge Cup. He also featured in Connacht's final game of the season, a play-off against Gloucester which they lost 40–32 after extra time. During the course of the season, Bealham signed a new two-year deal to keep him with the province until summer 2017.

Bealham was again a key part of Connacht's squad for the 2015–16 season, being the only player to feature in all 31 of the team's games in the league and in Europe. He started 13 of these games, and scored his first try for the team against Munster on 16 April 2016. On 28 May 2016, Bealham started in the Pro12 Grand Final as Connacht won 20–10 against Irish rivals and reigning champions Leinster to claim the team's first major trophy in their 121-year history.

Ahead of the 2016–17 season, Bealham signed a contract extension to keep him in Galway until 2019. With the retirement of Nathan White, he came into the season as Connacht's first choice tighthead. Bealham played 19 of the team's 22 games in the 2016–17 Pro12, starting all but six, and featured in all seven of the side's European games for the season. He continued to be a key player for Connacht in the following season and made his 100th appearance for the side on 16 February 2018 against Zebre In October 2018, Bealham signed another extension to his Connacht deal, this time extending to the end of the 2020–21 season. Bealham was named to the 2022–23 URC Elite XV of the year, his second domestic team of the year achievement.

== International career ==
Bealham was selected to play for the Australian schools team in 2009. He featured for the team's 'A' side against Tonga and New Zealand.

After becoming aware of his qualification to play for Ireland, Bealham became involved in the country's youth set-up through the Irish Exiles program. He made his debut for Ireland Under-20s against Italy in the 2011 Six Nations Under 20s Championship. Later that year, Bealham was part of the Irish squad for the 2011 IRB Junior World Championship. He made a total of four appearances for the side, three of these coming as a replacement.

Bealham was part of the Emerging Ireland squad for the 2015 Tbilisi Cup. He played in two of the team's fixtures, replacing Stephen Archer in the games against Emerging Italy and Georgia, scoring a try in the latter.

In January 2016, Bealham was called up to Ireland's squad for the Six Nations to replace the injured Marty Moore. After Cian Healy injured his hamstring, Bealham was promoted to the bench for the game against Italy. On 12 March 2016, 65 minutes into the game, he replaced Jack McGrath for his debut. Bealham was named in the Irish squad for the team's 2016 tour to South Africa, where he was named on the bench for all three tests, coming on as a 59th minute replacement for Tadhg Furlong in the second.

Bealham had been due to play in the first test of the 2022 Ireland rugby union tour of New Zealand at Eden Park in Auckland on 2 July, but had contracted COVID-19.

Bealham started every game of the 2025 Six Nations due to Tadhg Furlong being injured, and was nominated by player Will Greenwood as a candidate for Player of the tournament.

== Honours ==
Connacht

- 1× Pro12: 2016

Ireland

- 2× Six Nations Championship: 2023, 2024
- 1× Grand Slam: 2023
- 3× Triple Crown: 2022, 2023, 2025

Individual

- 2× United Rugby Championship Dream Team: 2015–16, 2022–23
