= Neville Meade =

British boxer

Personal information
- Nationality: British
- Born: Neville Meade; 12 September 1948 Montserrat
- Died: 13 March 2010 (aged 61) Swansea, Wales
- Height: 6 ft 0 in (1.83 m)
- Weight: Heavyweight

Boxing career

Boxing record
- Total fights: 34
- Wins: 20
- Win by KO: 18
- Losses: 13
- Draws: 1
- No contests: 0
Medal record
Boxing
Representing England
Commonwealth Games
Gold medal – first place	1974 Christchurch	heavyweight

Neville Meade (12 September 1948 – 13 March 2010) was a British boxer from Swansea. Born in Montserrat, he moved to Wales at the age of nine. He rose to prominence when he won the gold medal in the heavyweight division at the 1974 Commonwealth Games in New Zealand. He turned professional in 1974 and won the Welsh Heavyweight title in 1976 and then followed this with the British title in 1981. He retired in 1983 after a failed defence of his British title.

Meade was known for his big-hitting style of fighting with very few of his bouts going the distance. Of his 20 professional wins, 18 came via knockout. Despite this ability, Meade lacked motivation in training and during the middle of his career, with his weight reaching above 17 stone, he suffered a lack of form that saw him lose seven out of nine fights. He took on a new trainer, Jimmy Bromfield, in 1979 and this saw a change in his fortune which led to Meade taking the British Heavyweight title.

== Boxing career ==
=== Amateur career ===
Born and initially raised in Montserrat, Meade moved to the United Kingdom at the age of nine and grew up in Swansea, Wales. After leaving education he served in the Royal Air Force Regiment in Catterick. Meade boxed for the RAF representing the airforce in inter-service competitions and in amateur tournaments. In 1973 he reached the final of the heavyweight division of the Amateur Boxing Association of England (ABAE) National Championship held at Wembley Arena in London, but lost to Garfield McEwan. The next year, still representing the RAF, Meade again reached the heavyweight final, and on this occasion won, taking the English amateur title. By winning the England amateur title, Meade was afforded the opportunity of representing England in the 1974 Commonwealth games, held in Christchurch, New Zealand. Meade was given a bye through the preliminaries, and then beat Canada's Carroll Morgan on points in the Quarter finals. After beating Samoa's Vai Samu on points in the semi-final, Meade faced Nigerian Fatai Ayinla in the final. Despite Ayinla's greater experience as an amateur, having won the Commonwealth light-heavyweight silver in 1966 and the gold in 1970, Meade took the bout after the referee stopped the contest in Meade's favour, giving him the Commonwealth heavyweight gold medal.

=== Professional career ===
==== 1974–1976: Welsh Heavyweight title ====
In September 1974, a little over seven months after taking the Commonwealth gold, Meade boxed in his first professional bout. His opponent was Tony Mikulski, who came to the fight with a run of seven professional wins. The contest, held at the Grosvenor House Hotel in London, went the full six rounds, with the referee giving the result to Mikulski. A month later, on 14 October, Meade faced Roger Barlow in an eight-round bout in Swansea. Meade stopped Barlow via technical knockout in the third giving him his first professional win. A week later Meade entered a £2000 knock-out competition held at the Grosvenor. Meade faced three opponents that night, beating Harold James by points followed by a first-round knockout of Les McGowan before achieving a first-round technical knockout over Geoff Hepplestone in the final. Meade ended 1974 with a win over Eddie Fenton at the National Sporting Club in London.

On 17 February 1975, Meade faced Richard Dunn in London and lost via a technical knockout, the first time Meade had been stopped within the distance of a bout at professional level. Later that year Dunn took the British heavyweight title, and then in 1976 lost a World Heavyweight title bout against Muhammad Ali. After the Dunn fight, Meade twice faced London fighter Tony Moore. The first ended in another defeat for Meade, a technical knockout in the sixth; while the second encounter ended in a draw after the fight went the full eight rounds. Meade completed 1975 with five wins, a points win in his third match with Moore and four technical knockouts over Lloyd Walford, Derek Simpkin, John Depledge and Lucien Rodriguez. The contest with Rodriquez, who would become the French and European Heavyweight champion, was held in Paris, Meade's first professional fight outside the United Kingdom.

Meade started 1976 with a defeat, losing to Spanish-based boxer Alfredo Evangelista in Madrid on 12 March. Two weeks later Meade challenged for his first notable professional title when a match was arranged between him and Tony Blackburn for the Welsh Heavyweight belt. The ten round bout, held at the Mayfair Suite in Swansea, lasted only until the fourth round when Blackburn was stopped through a technical knockdown. This was followed by a win over Garfield Owen who had beaten Meade in his 1973 ABAE final.

==== 1976–1979: Loss of form ====
On 11 August 1976 Meade was offered a step towards a British belt with a first round eliminator for the British Heavyweight title. Held at Cardiff in Wales, Meade was stopped in the seventh by Denton Ruddock, denting his chances for a title shot. This was the start of a protracted fall in form for Meade that lasted until 1979, in which he suffered more losses than wins for the first time in his professional career. Meade followed the Ruddock fight this with another loss, suffering a technical knockout in the sixth in an encounter with future European champion John Lewis Gardner. Meade managed to defeat Bjorn Rudi in Oslo, but then lost in Brussels to Jean-Pierre Coopman on the Belgian's way to taking the European Heavyweight title, then Meade was knocked-out for the first time in his professional career, by South African Kallie Knoetze in Johannesburg. In December 1977, while back in Britain, he stopped his run of bad results with a win over American Bruce Grandham, but then lost the rematch in March 1978. This was followed by two more defeats, both through stoppages, by Paul Sykes in May 1978 and then to Albert Syben in January 1979.

==== 1980–1983: British Heavyweight Champion ====
Meade, now 30, was in poor shape as a contender for the British title. Since winning the Welsh belt, Meade had fought ten times, losing seven and six of them were stoppages within the distance. In an attempt to change his fortunes, Meade linked up with trainer Jimmy Bromfield, boxing out of Colin Breen's gym in Sandfields, Swansea. Meade spent a year away from professional fighting, making his comeback for a defence of his Welsh title against David Pearce in early 1980. The ten round fight, held at Caerphilly, lasted until the second, with Meade winning via a controversial stoppage. Meade followed this with an identical second round stoppage in another Welsh title defence, this time over Cardiff fighter Winston Allen. His turn in form was rewarded with a first round eliminator to choose the next challenger for the British Heavyweight title. His opponent was Stan Dermott, a London-based fighter, and their encounter was held at the Royal Albert Hall in the capital on 8 December 1980. This time Meade took his chance and stopped Dermott in the fifth round, leaving just one more fight for a shot at the belt. The final eliminator was held in Wales, at Ebbw Vale, and Meade, facing Terry Mintus from Leeds, recorded his fourth straight knockout this time in the third round.

Meade's title challenge for the British Heavyweight title was arranged for 12 October 1981 to be held at the Aston Villa Leisure Centre in Birmingham. His opponent was Northern Ireland boxer Gordon Ferris, who had taken the belt from Billy Aird in March that year. The fight, shown live on British television, lasted less than a round. The contest began slowly, with both boxers trading searching shots at range with little contact made. With just less than thirty seconds to go before the bell Meade connected with a left jab to Ferris left temple; as Ferris recovered and began moving back into position, Meade was already following up with a right hand hook. Meade's hook landed on the left side of Ferris' jaw and Ferris dropped to the canvas. The referee began the count but quickly realised that the prone Ferris would not recover and so ended the fight, making Meade the new British Heavyweight champion.

After winning the title Meade was signed up by boxing promoter Terry Lawless, breaking the Meade-Bromfield partnership. Meade followed up his title victory with an encounter with American Leroy Boone, less than a month later. The ten round fight went the full distance with referee Harry Gibbs giving the decision to Boone. Meade was back on winning form when he knocked out Rick Kellar in February of the next year when the two fought at the National Exhibition Centre in Birmingham. Meade's final fight was his first defence of his British title, fought at St David's Hall in Cardiff on 22 September 1983. His opponent was David Pearce, who Meade had beaten at the start of his comeback in 1980. The match was the last British title fight ever to be held over 15 rounds, as the two fighters had signed contracts before the rule change came in. The contest ended in the ninth, when Meade was stopped by a technical knockout. He never fought professionally again.

== Fighting style ==
Meade was a big-hitting heavyweight which is attested by his knockout ratio of 18 in 20 wins, with only two contests going the full distance, and one of those being a four-round contest. Meade's problem was seen as a lack of finesse, as in the words of one commentator, he was a "hit or get hit" type of boxer. Meade disliked training and this showed as he got older, often coming in at over 17 stone. When Bromfield became his manager it was on agreement that Meade would stick to his training and this paid dividends when the fighter got down to 16 stone and 3 pounds for his title decider with Ferris.

== Personal life ==
Meade had three long-term partners, with whom he had five children. Michelle, Meade's third child was born in 1977. Michelle grew up and went to school in Cardiff. After school Michelle moved to Worksop to finish her studies at Welbeck Defence Sixth Form College. She then returned to Cardiff where she trained to be an accountant. She is currently still living in Cardiff with her husband and two young sons. James is the youngest of Meade's five children, born in 1988. James grew up in Swansea and is a mortgage advisor. Meade is also the great-uncle of Jernade Meade, Premier League Footballer, formally of Arsenal F.C. and Swansea City AFC.

== Later life ==
After boxing Meade found life difficult and became an alcoholic. In 2004, he was living in a hostel for the homeless and wound up in court after assaulting a police officer. His life improved after that and he spent time as a youth worker, but late in 2009 he was diagnosed with cancer and he died at Tŷ Olwen Hospice at Morriston Hospital in Swansea on 13 March 2010.

== Professional boxing record ==
20 Wins (18 knockouts, 2 decisions), 13 Losses (9 knockouts, 4 decisions), 1 Draw Archived 6 April 2015 at the Wayback Machine
Result	Record	Opponent	Type	Round	Date	Location	Notes
Loss	15-2-1	(Wales) David Pearce	TKO	9	1983-09-22	St David's Hall, Cardiff, Wales	BBBofC Heavyweight Title. Referee stopped the bout at 2:57 of the ninth round.
Win	11-2	(United States) Rick Kellar	KO	6	1982-02-21	(United Kingdom) National Exhibition Centre, Birmingham, England	Kellar knocked out at 2:30 of the sixth round.
Loss	13-9-1	(United States) Leroy Boone	PTS	10	1981-11-03	(United Kingdom) Royal Albert Hall, London, England	
Win	17-4	(Northern Ireland) Gordon Ferris	KO	1	1981-10-12	(United Kingdom) Aston Arena, Birmingham, England	BBBofC Heavyweight Title. Ferris knocked out at 2:45 of the first round.
Win	13-12-3	(Saint Kitts and Nevis) Terry Mintus	TKO	3	1981-03-26	(United Kingdom) Leisure Centre, Ebbw Vale, Wales	Referee stopped the bout at 1:55 of the third round.
Win	10-3-1	(United Kingdom) Stan McDermott	TKO	5	1980-12-08	(United Kingdom) Royal Albert Hall, London, England	Referee stopped the bout at 1:42 of the fifth round.
Win	11-8	(Wales) Winston Allen	TKO	2	1980-10-01	Top Rank Suite, Swansea, Wales	BBBofC Wales Heavyweight Title.
Win	9-0	(Wales) David Pearce	TKO	2	1980-01-22	Double Diamond Club, Caerphilly, Wales	BBBofC Wales Heavyweight Title. Referee stopped the bout at 2:48 of the second round.
Loss	18-0-2	(Belgium) Albert Syben	TKO	4	1979-01-19	Brussels, Belgium	
Loss	2-1	(United Kingdom) Paul Sykes	TKO	5	1978-05-15	(United Kingdom) Yorkshire Executive S.C., Bradford, England	Referee stopped the bout at 1:45 of the fifth round.
Loss	9-3	(United States) Bruce Grandham	KO	3	1978-03-31	(United Kingdom) Liverpool Stadium, Liverpool, England	
Win	9-2	(United States) Bruce Grandham	TKO	3	1977-12-08	(United Kingdom) Liverpool Stadium, Liverpool, England	
Loss	10-2	(South Africa) Kallie Knoetze	KO	4	1977-06-04	Milner Park Showgrounds, Johannesburg, South Africa	
Loss	28-5	(Belgium) Jean-Pierre Coopman	PTS	10	1976-12-25	Izegem, Belgium	
Win	15-2	(Norway) Bjorn Rudi	TKO	7	1976-12-02	Messehallen, Oslo, Norway	
Loss	21-0	(United Kingdom) John L. Gardner	TKO	6	1976-10-26	(United Kingdom) Royal Albert Hall, London, England	
Loss	5-0	(United Kingdom) Denton Ruddock	TKO	7	1976-08-11	Cardiff, Wales	
Win	4-1	(United Kingdom) Garfield McEwan	TKO	9	1976-05-26	(United Kingdom) Wolverhampton Civic Hall, Wolverhampton, England	
Win	18-10-1	(Wales) Tony Blackburn	TKO	4	1976-03-29	Mayfair Suite, Swansea, Wales	BBBofC Wales Heavyweight Title.
Loss	3-0-1	(Uruguay) Alfredo Evangelista	PTS	8	1976-03-12	Madrid, Spain	
Win	9-0	(France) Lucien Rodriguez	TKO	3	1975-11-04	Paris, France	
Win	11-1-1	(United Kingdom) Tony Moore	PTS	8	1975-09-24	(United Kingdom) Solihull Civic Hall, Solihull, England	
Win	5-10-1	(United Kingdom) John Depledge	TKO	5	1975-09-17	Sophia Gardens, Cardiff, Wales	
Win	10-3-1	(United Kingdom) Derek Simpkin	TKO	3	1975-08-06	Sophia Gardens, Cardiff, Wales	
Win	27-34-4	(Jamaica) Lloyd Walford	TKO	6	1975-07-02	Top Rank Suite, Swansea, Wales	
Draw	11-1	(United Kingdom) Tony Moore	PTS	8	1975-06-05	(United Kingdom) Cunard Hotel, London, England	
Loss	10-1	(United Kingdom) Tony Moore	TKO	6	1975-04-29	(United Kingdom) Royal Albert Hall, London, England	
Loss	27-9	(United Kingdom) Richard Dunn	TKO	4	1975-02-17	(United Kingdom) Grosvenor House, London, England	
Win	9-2-1	(United Kingdom) Eddie Fenton	TKO	5	1974-11-18	(United Kingdom) National Sporting Club, London, England	
Win	0-2	(United Kingdom) Harold James	PTS	4	1974-10-21	(United Kingdom) Grosvenor House, London, England	Heavyweight Tournament Final.
Win	5-2-1	(United Kingdom) Les McGowan	KO	1	1974-10-21	(United Kingdom) Grosvenor House, London, England	Heavyweight Tournament Semi-Final.
Win	--	(United Kingdom) Geoff Hepplestone	TKO	1	1974-10-21	(United Kingdom) Grosvenor House, London, England	Heavyweight Tournament Quarter-Final.
Win	10-3-1	(United Kingdom) Roger Barlow	TKO	3	1974-10-14	Top Rank Suite, Swansea, Wales	
Loss	7-0	(United Kingdom) Tony Mikulski	PTS	6	1974-09-09	(United Kingdom) Grosvenor House, London, England	

== See also ==
- List of British heavyweight boxing champions
