= Gordon Ferris =

Irish boxer

Personal information
- Nationality: British, Irish
- Born: 21 November 1952 Enniskillen, Northern Ireland
- Weight: Heavyweight
- Relative: Finlay Bealham (first cousin once removed)

Boxing career

Boxing record
- Total fights: 26
- Wins: 20
- Win by KO: 11
- Losses: 6
- Draws: 0

Gordon Ferris (born 21 November 1952) is a Northern Irish former heavyweight boxer who was both Irish and British champion in the early 1980s.

== Career ==
Born in Enniskillen, Northern Ireland, and a lock-keeper by trade, Ferris had a distinguished amateur career, winning a bronze medal at the 1974 Commonwealth Games and five Irish amateur titles.

After missing out on selection for the 1976 Olympic Games, Ferris took the decision to turn professional and made his pro debut in December 1977 with a win over Keith Steve Johnson. He won 14 of his first 18 pro fights, leading to a final eliminator for the British heavyweight title in September 1980 against Tommy Kiely, with the Irish and Northern Ireland Area titles also at stake; He won on points over 12 rounds, leading to a fight with Billy Aird for the vacant British title. He won by a 15-round points decision to become British champion. He lost the title in his first defence, against Neville Meade in October 1981, losing by a first-round knockout. He attempted to get another shot at the title but was beaten in a final eliminator in June 1982 by David Pearce, after which he retired from boxing.

He subsequently ran pubs in Gloucester and Stoke-on-Trent.

The Irish rugby union player, Finlay Bealham is his first cousin once removed.
