= Rudy Gauwe =

Belgian boxer

Personal information
- Nationality: Belgian
- Born: 14 June 1951 (age 75) Lokeren, Belgium
- Height: 6 ft 2 in (1.88 m)
- Weight: Heavyweight

Boxing career

Boxing record
- Total fights: 32
- Wins: 18
- Win by KO: 12
- Losses: 12
- Draws: 2

Rudy Gauwe (born 14 June 1951) is a Belgian former professional boxer. As an amateur, he competed in the men's heavyweight event at the 1976 Summer Olympics, where he was defeated by Clarence Hill of Bermuda in the quarterfinals.

== Professional boxing record ==
32 fights	18 wins	12 losses
By knockout	12	7
By decision	6	5
Draws	2	

No.	Result	Record	Opponent	Type	Round	Date	Location	Notes
32	Loss	18–12-2	(Netherlands) Andre van den Oetelaar	PTS	10	1985-02-11	Jaap Edenhal, Amsterdam, Netherlands	For Benelux heavyweight title
31	Loss	18–11-2	(Sweden) Anders Eklund	TKO	6	1984-10-27	Mariehamn, Finland	
30	Loss	18–10-2	(Netherlands) Maik Krol	DQ	4	1984-10-01	Sporthal Maaspoort, Den Bosch, Netherlands	Lost Benelux heavyweight title
29	Loss	18–9-2	(Germany) Reiner Hartmann	PTS	8	1984-02-10	Sporthalle Süd, Frankfurt, Germany	
28	Loss	18–8-2	(United Kingdom) Frank Bruno	KO	2	1982-11-09	(United Kingdom) Royal Albert Hall, London, England	
27	Win	18–7-2	(Belgium) Robert Desnouck	PTS	10	1982-05-15	Zele, Belgium	Won Benelux heavyweight title
26	Win	17–7-2	(Spain) Victor Varon	KO	1	1982-02-12	Zele, Belgium	
25	Win	16–7-2	(United Kingdom) Tony Moore	PTS	8	1981-10-17	Zele, Belgium	
24	Loss	15–7-2	(Belgium) Albert Syben	TKO	8	1981-04-17	Liège, Belgium	Lost Belgium heavyweight title
23	Loss	15–6-2	(Italy) Giovanni De Luca	TKO	6	1981-02-14	Zele, Belgium	
22	Win	15–5-2	(United Kingdom) Bob Young	KO	4	1981-01-03	Zele, Belgium	For Belgium heavyweight title
21	Loss	14–5-2	(United Kingdom) Stewart Lithgo	PTS	8	1980-11-21	Zele, Belgium	
20	Loss	14–4-2	(United States) James Dixon	PTS	10	1980-10-25	Herentals, Belgium	
19	Loss	14–3-2	(United Kingdom) John L Gardner	RTD	9	1980-04-22	(United Kingdom) Royal Albert Hall, London, England	For vacant European heavyweight title
18	Win	14–2-2	(France) Christian Poncelet	PTS	10	1980-01-26	Zele, Belgium	
17	Win	13–2-2	(Belgium) Albert Syben	KO	8	1979-12-14	Brussels, Belgium	Won Belgium heavyweight title
16	Win	12–2-2	(United States) Don Halpin	TKO	3	1979-11-10	Zele, Belgium	
15	Loss	11–2-2	(Belgium) Albert Syben	KO	3	1979-04-21	Lokeren, Belgium	Lost Belgium heavyweight title
14	Loss	11–1-2	(United Kingdom) Tony Moore	KO	2	1978-11-01	Zele, Belgium	
13	Win	11–0-2	(Belgium) Jean Pierre Coopman	PTS	12	1978-09-30	Turnhout, Belgium	Won Belgium heavyweight title
12	Win	10–0-2	(United States) Dave Wilson	PTS	8	1978-05-19	Appelterre, Belgium	
11	Win	9–0-2	(United Kingdom) Terry Mintus	KO	4	1978-04-29	Zele, Belgium	
10	Win	8–0-2	(Zaire) Lisimo Obutobe	TKO	1 (6), 2:05	1978-03-25	Zele, Belgium	
9	Win	7–0-2	(Italy) Vasco Faustino	PTS	1 (6), 1:48	1978-01-07	Zele, Belgium	
8	Draw	6–0-2	(Zaire) Lisimo Obutobe	PTS	2 (6), 2:03	1977-11-11	Zele, Belgium	
7	Win	6–0-1	(Republic of the Congo) Jean Tshikuna	TKO	3	1977-10-08	Zele, Belgium	
6	Win	5–0-1	(Germany) Horst Lang	KO	4	1977-09-10	Zele, Belgium	
5	Win	4–0-1	(Italy) Ferruccio Mazzardi	TKO	2	1977-04-16	Zele, Belgium	
4	Draw	3–0-1	(France) Jean Belval	PTS	6	1977-03-05	Hamme, Belgium	
3	Win	3–0	(Italy) Fausto Costantino	KO	1 (4), 2:32	1977-02-19	Zele, Belgium	
2	Win	2–0	(Mali) Lassine Niare	KO	1 (4), 1:02	1977-01-08	Zele, Belgium	
1	Win	1–0	(France) Maurice Trepant	KO	3	1976-11-11	Zele, Belgium	
