= Hughroy Currie =

Jamaican-British boxer (1959–2021)

Trevor Hughroy Currie
Personal information
- Nickname: Hughroy
- Born: Trevor Currie; 9 February 1959 Kingston, Colony of Jamaica, British Empire
- Died: 22 January 2021 (aged 61)
- Height: 6 ft 1 in (1.85 m)
- Weight: Heavyweight

Boxing career

Boxing record
- Total fights: 29
- Wins: 17
- Win by KO: 7
- Losses: 11
- Draws: 1

Trevor "Hughroy" Currie (9 February 1959 – 22 January 2021) was a Jamaican-born British heavyweight boxer who was the British heavyweight champion between 1985 and 1986. Born in Kingston, Jamaica, Hughroy, also known as Trevor, went to West Greenwich Secondary School, Blackheath Road, Greenwich, after coming to London with his family. He joined Catford and Lewisham Boxing Club and had his first professional fight in February 1981, a win over Mick Chmilowskyi.

== Career ==
Based in London, Currie had his first professional fight in February 1981, a win over Mick Chmilowskyi. After an undistinguished start to his professional career in which he won only three of his first eight fights, a run of five straight wins led to a challenge for the Southern Area title against Funso Banjo; Banjo won on points over ten rounds.

Currie then travelled to the United States where he won both his fights, and in September 1985 he fought Banjo once again, this time for the British heavyweight title after David Pearce was forced to vacate; Pearce had KO'd Currie in a British amateur bout and Currie stated he was relieved not to face Pearce. Currie won a 12-round points decision against Banjo to become British champion. His next fight was an eliminator for the Commonwealth title against Proud Kilimanjaro, which he won over 10 rounds. He lost his British title at the first defence to Horace Notice in April 1986, Notice winning by a sixth-round TKO. Currie won four of his next five fights, including a second-round knockout of Glenn McCrory, leading to another shot at the then vacant British title against Gary Mason; Mason won by a fourth-round knockout.

Currie then fought Derek Williams in December 1989 for both the Commonwealth title and the vacant EBU European title; Williams won by a first-round TKO. That proved to be Currie's final fight when he retired from boxing.
