= Ngozika Ekwelum =

Nigerian heavyweight boxer

Personal information
- Nationality: Nigerian
- Born: 15 March 1948 (age 78)
- Weight: Heavyweight

Boxing career

Boxing record
- Total fights: 31
- Wins: 17
- Win by KO: 14
- Losses: 9
- Draws: 5

Ngozika Ekwelum (born 15 March 1948) is a Nigerian former heavyweight boxer, who held the Nigerian and African Boxing Union heavyweight titles in the 1970s and 1980s.

== Career ==
From Anambra State, as an amateur, Ekwelum competed in the 1970 Commonwealth Games in Edinburgh, losing in the quarter-final to Irishman John McKinty.

Ekwelum spent much of his professional career based in Germany. He made his professional debut in September 1973, knocking out Ireno Werleman in the second round. Two months later, in his third fight, he drew with former Italian champion Armando Zanini in Brescia. In his next fight, in February 1974, he suffered his first professional defeat, to the vastly experienced Argentine Avenamar Peralta. He followed this the next month with a drawn fight with another Argentine, Santiago Lovell. A seventh-round knockout of Richard Dunn followed in April 1974. In January 1975 he knocked Eddie Neilson down four times before winning by a send-round stoppage, and a month later lost a narrow points decision to Billy Aird, both of these fights taking place in England. Back in Germany, between March 1975 and May 1976, he won five fights and drew one. In November 1976 he travelled to Madrid to face Argentine champion Raul Gorosito, the 8-round fight judged a draw. In December 1976 he beat future world title challenger Lucien Rodriguez on points, then had a run of three defeats; First, in January 1977 he was stopped in the seventh round in Johannesburg by Kallie Knoetze, which saw him receive a lifetime ban from the Nigerian Boxing Board of Control for fighting in South Africa. In May he was stopped in the sixth round by John L. Gardner at the Royal Albert Hall, in what would have been a fight for the vacant Commonwealth title, but the Nigerian authorities refused to sanction it due to Ekwelum's fight in South Africa. He was then out of the ring until September 1978, when he was disqualified in the third round against Hennie Thoonen in Heerenveen for punching with the inside of the glove. He returned to winning ways in November 1978 with a fifth-round stoppage of German (BDB) champion Bernd August, and then in 1979 became based back in is home country, the ban evidently lifted. He had immediate success, knocking Eddie Cooper out in March to win the Nigerian heavyweight title. In October that year he knocked out Joe Kalala in the third round to take the African Boxing Union (ABU) title. In December 1979 he travelled to Canada to face Trevor Berbick, losing via a fifth-round stoppage. In March 1980 he stopped Paul Sykes in the first round, in what would prove to be his final win. He lost his ABU title in December 1983 to Proud Kilimanjaro, the Zimbabwean knocking him out in the twelfth and final round. In November 1984 he lost to Malian Mary Konate, and in his final fight in August 1986, at the age of 38, he was beaten on points by Charles Udalor in a Nigerian heavyweight title clash.

In 2015, he was reportedly planning to open a boxing academy in Awka, Anambra State.

== Professional boxing record ==
32 fights	17 wins	10 losses
By knockout	14	5
By decision	3	4
By disqualification	0	1
Draws	5	

No.	Result	Record	Opponent	Type	Round, time	Date	Location	Notes
32	Loss	17–10–5	Charles Udalor	PTS	12	1 Aug 1986	Lagos, Lagos State, Nigeria	For vacant Nigerian heavyweight title
31	Loss	17–9–5	Mary Konate	TKO	7 (10)	14 Nov 1986	Abidjan, Ivory Coast	
30	Loss	17–8–5	Proud Kilimanjaro	KO	12 (12)	2 Dec 1983	Lagos, Lagos State, Nigeria	For African heavyweight title
29	Loss	17–7–5	Adama Mensah	PTS	12	1 Jan 1983	Ghana	For inaugural West African heavyweight title
28	Win	17–6–5	Paul Sykes	KO	1 (10)	29 Mar 1980	National Stadium, Lagos, Nigeria	
27	Loss	16–6–5	Trevor Berbick	TKO	5 (10), 0:01	11 Dec 1979	Halifax Metro Centre, Halifax, Canada	
26	Win	16–5–5	Joe Kalala	KO	3 (15)	5 Oct 1979	National Stadium, Lagos, Nigeria	Won inaugural African heavyweight title
25	Win	15–5–5	Tony Moore	TKO	6 (10)	7 Jul 1979	Lagos, Lagos State, Nigeria	
24	Win	14–5–5	Eddie Cooper	KO	3 (15)	8 Mar 1979	National Stadium, Lagos, Nigeria	Won inaugural Nigerian heavyweight title
23	Win	13–5–5	Bernd August	KO	5 (10)	6 Nov 1978	Berlin, West Germany	
22	Loss	12–5–5	Hennie Thoonen	DQ	3 (10)	16 Sep 1978	IJsstadion Thialf, Heerenveen, Netherlands	Ekwelum was disqualified for punching with the inner part of his glove
21	Loss	12–4–5	John L. Gardner	TKO	6 (10), 0:32	31 May 1977	Royal Albert Hall, London, England	
20	Loss	12–3–5	Kallie Knoetze	TKO	7 (10)	28 Jan 1977	Wembley Stadium, Johannesburg, South Africa	
19	Win	12–2–5	Lucien Rodriguez	PTS	8	12 Dec 1976	Berlin, West Germany	
18	Draw	11–2–5	Raúl Gorisito	PTS	8	19 Nov 1976	Madrid, Community of Madrid, Spain	
17	Win	11–2–4	Tony Moore	PTS	8	24 May 1976	Olympiahalle, Munich, West Germany	
16	Win	10–2–4	Terry Judge	KO	3 (8)	27 Dec 1975	Berlin, West Germany	
15	Win	9–2–4	Conny Velenšek	TKO	7 (8)	10 Oct 1975	Berlin, West Germany	
14	Win	8–2–4	Sugar Ray Anderson	KO	5 (8)	24 Jun 1975	Deutschlandhalle, Berlin, West Germany	
13	Draw	7–2–4	Sugar Ray Anderson	PTS	8	16 May 1975	Ludwigshafen, Rhineland-Palatinate, West Germany	
12	Win	7–2–3	Fernando Descamps	KO	2 (8)	18 Mar 1975	Berlin, West Germany	
11	Loss	6–2–3	Billy Aird	PTS	8	4 Feb 1975	20th Century FC Cliffs Pavilion, Southend-on-Sea, England	
10	Win	6–1–3	Eddie Neilson	TKO	2 (8), 2:30	6 Jan 1975	National Sporting Club, London, England	
9	Draw	5–1–3	Conny Velenšek	PTS	8	3 Sep 1974	Deutschlandhalle, Berlin, West Germany	
8	Win	5–1–2	José Antonio Gálvez	TKO	8 (8)	12 Jul 1974	Plaza de Toros de Palma, Palma de Mallorca, Spain	
7	Win	4–1–2	Kilani Ramdani	TKO	2 (6)	16 May 1974	Ernst-Merck-Halle, Hamburg, West Germany	
6	Win	3–1–2	Richard Dunn	KO	7 (10)	11 Apr 1974	Berlin, West Germany	
5	Draw	2–1–2	Santiago Lovell Jr.	PTS	8	14 Mar 1974	Cologne, North Rhine-Westphalia, West Germany	
4	Loss	2–1–1	Avenamar Peralta	PTS	10	20 Feb 1974	Deutschlandhalle, Berlin, West Germany	
3	Draw	2–0–1	Armando Zanini	PTS	8	24 Nov 1973	Brescia, Lombardy, Italy	
2	Win	2–0	José Antonio Gálvez	PTS	6	26 Oct 1973	Hamburg, Hamburg State, West Germany	
1	Win	1–0	Ireno Werleman	KO	2 (8)	28 Sep 1973	Berlin, West Germany	
