= Jean-Pierre Coopman =

Belgian boxer

Personal information
- Nickname: Lion of Flanders
- Nationality: Belgian
- Born: 11 July 1946 (age 80) Ingelmunster, West Flanders, Belgium
- Height: 5 ft 11.5 in (1.82 m)
- Weight: Heavyweight

Boxing career
- Stance: Orthodox

Boxing record
- Total fights: 54
- Wins: 36
- Win by KO: 20
- Losses: 16
- Draws: 2
- No contests: 0

Jean-Pierre Coopman (born 11 July 1946) is a retired Belgian boxer who is best known for his title fight against Muhammad Ali in 1976 in San Juan, Puerto Rico, which Ali won by KO in round 5.

== Early life ==
Jean-Pierre Coopman was born on 11 July 1946, in the Flemish (northern Belgium) community of Ingelmunster. Early in life, he showed a gift for artistry. He was instructed in sculpting by his stepfather, and Coopman's first fully paid job was as a stone cutter. The stone-cutting he learned from childhood was more specifically that of an artisan. His skills were put to use, among other things, in reparations of the medieval churches of Belgium—most notably, Saint Nicholas' Church in Ghent. By having to perform a kind of historic preservation, using and applying tools from this ancient period, Coopman developed great strength in his arms and hands.

In young adulthood, he appears to have been a lover of night-life, but after sparring several times with Gilbert Montagne, a noted Belgian middleweight, Coopman was urged to pursue a ring career, or at least to try. By his own words, once the decision was made, Coopman at least gave up smoking, and cold turkey at that.

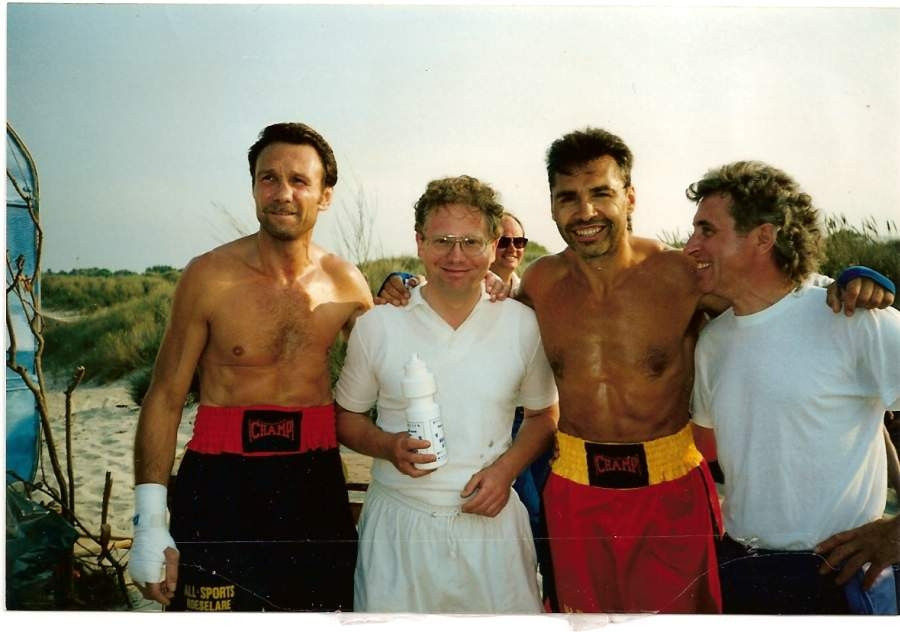
Jean-Pierre Coopman (left), the producer of Camping Cosmos in the middle and Freddy De Kerpel (right) during the shooting of the movie Camping Cosmos, August 1995, Westende, Belgium.

== Fighting career ==
Though best known in fight circles as an opponent of Muhammad Ali, Coopman had been fighting for a half decade, before being granted his title shot at "The Greatest". He began in the amateur ranks, rising quickly enough to compete in the 1971 European Championships, where he was knocked out by a far more experienced (315 fights) Soviet fighter. He turned professional in 1972.

Coopman fought his early bouts primarily in Belgium, though he is recorded as having won an early match versus Harald Skog, in Oslo, Norway. Coopman lost (via decision) to Rudie Lubbers of The Netherlands, in 1973. Coopman's earlier record shows a disqualification victory over Terry Daniels, who had also received a title shot during his own career, versus Smokin' Joe Frazier, in January 1972. Despite mixed fortunes, Coopman proved popular with his fellow Belgians, and by 1975, was able to pursue boxing as a full-time career; the company which employed him to sculpt, now paid him to fight, instead.

Coopman was said to have been one of the least deserving heavyweight boxers to receive a heavyweight title shot. Ali had recently had his third fight with Joe Frazier, the "Thrilla in Manila", a match Ali later called, "the closest thing to death." Understandably, the champion wanted an "easy" opponent. The match was made almost by happenstance, as the promotion fell to George Kanter, a Belgian by birth. Kanter, after surveying the European scene, contacted Charles de Jager, Coopman's manager, and thus the match was made. Coopman, unknown outside Belgium, was overwhelmed by the sudden fame. Ali was a hero to him, and he was grateful for a title shot.

Coopman was dubbed "The Lion of Flanders" by the Western press, but he had never called himself that. The name was thought to be related to Coopman's birthday, 11 July, which is a national holiday in Flanders marking a military victory over the French, in 1302.

The fight took place in San Juan, Puerto Rico, on 20 February 1976 at Roberto Clemente Coliseum; the fight was not broadcast by Belgian media, as Belgium banned boxing broadcasts. CBS Sports broadcast the bout in the US for free, in prime time. The bout was easy for Ali, who knocked out Coopman in round five.

After the Ali fight, Coopman became European champion after beating a Basque, Jose Urtain. Two months later, in Antwerp, he lost the title to Lucien Rodriguez of France. He retired in 1980. His last official fight was against Cookie Wallace.

In 1995 he fought Freddy De Kerpel while acting in the film Camping Cosmos.

As of 2007, Coopman was painting oil paintings of famous boxers. He was awarded a contract to sculpt a statue of fellow Belgian fighter Cyril Delannoit.

Coopman was the subject of "Lion", a tongue-in-cheek tribute by songwriter Freddy Blohm.

== Professional boxing record ==
36 Wins (20 knockouts, 13 decisions, 3 DQ), 16 Losses (6 knockouts, 9 decisions, 1 DQ), 2 Draws
Result	Record	Opponent	Type	Round	Date	Location	Notes
Draw	36-16-2	(Belgium) Freddy De Kerpel	MD	6	1999-04-05	Ghent, Belgium	
Loss	36-16-1	(Luxembourg) Dragomir Milo Popovic	TKO	5	1981-05-16	Liège, Belgium	
Win	36-15-1	(Italy) Vincenzo Pesapane	TKO	3	1981-04-03	Piacenza, Italy	
Loss	35-15-1	(Zaire) Pierre Babo Kabassu	PTS	8	1980-12-25	Izegem, Belgium	
Loss	35-14-1	(Netherlands) Rudie Lubbers	TKO	5	1980-09-29	Energiehal, Rotterdam, Netherlands	
Loss	35-13-1	(Belgium) Albert Syben	PTS	10	1980-06-27	Molenbeek-Saint-Jean, Belgium	
Loss	35-12-1	(Wales) Winston Allenq	KO	1	1980-05-01	Izegem, Belgium	
Win	35-11-1	(England) Denton Ruddock	PTS	10	1980-02-02	Turnhout, Belgium	
Loss	34-11-1	(Argentina) Avenamar Peralta	PTS	10	1979-12-25	Izegem, Belgium	
Loss	34-10-1	(Germany) George Butzbach	PTS	10	1979-11-01	Izegem, Belgium	
Loss	34-9-1	(Belgium) Rudy Gauwe	PTS	12	1978-09-30	Turnhout, Belgium	Belgium Heavyweight Title.
Win	34-8-1	(Canada) Scotty Welsh	DQ	1	1978-09-02	Izegem, Belgium	
Win	33-8-1	(Italy) Mario Baruzzi	TKO	6	1978-04-22	La Louviere, Belgium	
Win	32-8-1	(Argentina) Santiago Alberto Lovell	TKO	3	1978-02-11	Liège, Belgium	
Loss	31-8-1	(Uruguay) Alfredo Evangelista	KO	1	1977-11-26	Brussels, Belgium	EBU Heavyweight Title.
Draw	31-7-1	(England) Tony Moore	PTS	10	1977-11-01	Izegem, Belgium	
Win	31–7	(Germany) Kurt Luedecke	PTS	10	1977-09-09	Izegem, Belgium	
Loss	30–7	(France) Lucien Rodriguez	UD	15	1977-05-07	(Belgium) Antwerp	EBU Heavyweight Title.
Win	30–6	(Spain) Jose Manuel Urtain	KO	4	1977-03-12	Sportpaleis, Antwerp, Belgium	EBU Heavyweight Title.
Loss	29–6	(France) Lucien Rodriguez	PTS	10	1977-01-15	Brussels, Belgium	
Win	29–5	(Wales) Neville Meade	PTS	10	1976-12-25	Izegem, Belgium	
Win	28–5	(United States) Roy Wallace	PTS	10	1976-11-20	Liège, Belgium	
Win	27–5	(Canada) George Jerome	KO	4	1976-11-01	Izegem, Belgium	
Win	26–5	(Netherlands) Hennie Thoonen	TKO	6	1976-10-09	Antwerp, Belgium	
Loss	25–5	(Netherlands) Hennie Thoonen	DQ	5	1976-05-31	Rotterdam Ahoy Sportpaleis, Rotterdam, Netherlands	
Win	25–4	(Mali) Ba Sounkalo	PTS	10	1976-05-07	Izegem, Belgium	
Loss	24–4	(United States) Muhammad Ali	KO	5	1976-02-20	Roberto Clemente Coliseum, Hato Rey, Puerto Rico	WBC/WBA Heavyweight Titles. Coopman knocked out at 2:46 of the fifth round.
Win	24–3	(Zaire) Lisimo Obutobe	TKO	7	1975-11-01	Izegem, Belgium	
Win	23–3	(Uruguay) Domingo Silveira	PTS	10	1975-10-04	Antwerp, Belgium	
Win	22–3	(United States) Terry Daniels	DQ	7	1975-05-17	Antwerp, Belgium	
Win	21–3	(Germany) Karsten Honhold	TKO	6	1975-04-12	Menen, Belgium	
Win	20–3	(Netherlands) Jan Lubbers	PTS	10	1975-03-14	Bruges, Belgium	
Win	19–3	(Italy) Adriano Rosati	TKO	5	1975-02-21	Izegem, Belgium	
Win	18–3	(United States) Charley Green	KO	8	1975-01-17	Ghent, Belgium	
Win	17–3	(Italy) Vasco Faustino	PTS	10	1974-12-25	Izegem, Belgium	
Win	16–3	(Germany) Bernd August	PTS	10	1974-11-22	Ghent, Belgium	
Win	15–3	(Italy) Lino Finotti	KO	4	1974-11-01	Izegem, Belgium	
Win	14–3	(Antigua and Barbuda) Rocky Campbell	KO	6	1974-09-27	Turnhout, Belgium	
Loss	13–3	(Netherlands) Rudie Lubbers	PTS	10	1974-04-27	Ghent, Belgium	
Win	13–2	(Hungary) Ferenc Kristofcsak	DQ	3	1974-02-22	Roulers, Belgium	
Win	12–2	(Aruba) Ireno Werleman	KO	1	1974-01-25	Izegem, Belgium	
Win	11–2	(France) Jean Belval	PTS	6	1973-12-23	Izegem, Belgium	
Win	10–2	(Germany) Horst Lang	KO	3	1973-11-16	Ghent, Belgium	
Win	9–2	(Netherlands Antilles) Erwin Josefa	KO	3	1973-11-01	Izegem, Belgium	
Win	8–2	(Spain) Juan Rodriguez	TKO	3	1973-09-08	Izegem, Belgium	
Loss	7–2	(Aruba) Ireno Werleman	KO	2	1973-05-18	Izegem, Belgium	
Win	7–1	(Luxembourg) Ray Philippe	KO	5	1973-05-05	Ghent, Belgium	
Win	6–1	(Italy) Ermanno Festorazzi	PTS	6	1973-03-16	Ingelmunster, Belgium	
Win	5–1	(Italy) Gino Martinis	PTS	6	1973-02-16	Ingelmunster, Belgium	
Loss	4–1	(Norway) Harald Skog	PTS	6	1973-01-25	Messehallen, Oslo, Norway	
Win	4–0	(Tunisia) Kilani Ramdani	PTS	6	1972-12-25	Izegem, Belgium	
Win	3–0	(Italy) Antonio Rimasti	KO	4	1972-12-08	Tournai, Belgium	
Win	2–0	(Germany) Siegfried Ackers	TKO	2	1972-11-01	Izegem, Belgium	
Win	1–0	(Germany) Norbert Suehrig	TKO	3	1972-09-29	Menen, Belgium	

== See also ==
- Muhammad Ali vs. Jean-Pierre Coopman
