= Proud Kilimanjaro =

Zimbabwean boxer

Personal information
- Nickname: Man Mountain
- Nationality: Zimbabwean
- Born: Proud Chinembriri; 1st January 1958 Harare Zimbabwe
- Died: 2 July 1994 (aged 35–36) Mbare
- Height: 6 ft 6 in (198 cm)
- Weight: Heavyweight

Boxing career

Boxing record
- Total fights: 34
- Wins: 32
- Win by KO: 28
- Losses: 7
- No contests: 1

Proud Chinembriri (1 January 1958 – 2 July 1994), known professionally as Proud Kilimanjaro, was a Zimbabwean heavyweight boxer, who was the Zimbabwean heavyweight champion between 1982 and his retirement in 1990, and African Boxing Union champion between 1982 and 1987, and again between 1988 and 1990. He once challenged for the common wealth title in 1987

== Early life ==
Born in the high-density suburb of Mbare, Harare (formerly Salisbury), Proud was initially named Proud Chinembriri the name of his brother and manager, Punish Chinembiri. His ring name, Proud Kilimanjaro, was a symbolic nod to Africa’s tallest mountain and reflected both his size and ambition, he also may have been nicknamed Killi as most of his appearances during fights he would have the words killi on his trunks.

Before turning to boxing, he worked as a football goalkeeper, nightclub bouncer, and even reportedly a professional mugger in Bulawayo. His unorthodox path to the ring was driven by both his physical presence and charisma.

== Boxing career ==
Before taking up boxing, Chinembriri played football professionally as a goalkeeper in Zimbabwe for four years.

An imposing figure at 6 feet and 6 inches tall, and nicknamed the "man mountain", Kilimanjaro made his professional boxing debut in October 1981 with a fourth-round stoppage of Black Tiger, after being taken on by trainer and manager Dave Wellings. He had had no amateur fights as prospective opponents refused to fight him. Kilimanjaro made a remarkable entry into professional boxing, winning his first four fights by knockout. In April 1982, in only his fifth fight he won the Zimbabwe heavyweight title with a knockout of Walter Ringo Starr, taking only 15 seconds. In September 1982 he stopped Adama Mensah in the sixth round in front of a crowd of 15,000 at the Rufaro Stadium, Harare to take the African Boxing Union heavyweight title. The win gave 'Kili' a top 10 WBC world ranking.

Soon after, in his seventh professional fight, Kilimanjaro captured the African Heavyweight Championship, establishing himself as the continent’s top heavyweight. His fights routinely drew massive crowds, with some events in Harare attracting up to 30,000 spectators. He remained undefeated during the first 4 years of his career, defending his ABU title against Joe Kalala, Ngozika Ekwelum, Kid Power, and Captain Cleopas Marvel, and made a successful defence of his Zimbabwean title against Jukebox Timebomb.

In November 1985 he faced Hughroy Currie in Cardiff in a Commonwealth title eliminator; The fight went the distance, with referee Harry Gibbs awarding the fight to Currie by a single point. Kilimanjaro did, however, get his shot at the title in March 1987 when he faced Horace Notice in Dudley, the champion stopping him in the eighth round.

He made a further successful defence of his African title against Mary Konate, before losing it to Michael Simuwelu in August 1987, regaining it a year later with an eleventh-round knockout of Simuwelu after taking on trainer Gabriel Moyo. He also made a further defence of his national title in December 1988, stopping Black Tiger in six rounds. He had two further fights, forcing Bombaphani Bonyongo Destroyer to retire with a cut in four rounds in July 1989, and a knockout of Sam Sithole in February 1990. He had been due to face Lennox Lewis in a televised Commonwealth title eliminator in London in February 1990 but was prevented from competing after refusing to divulge the results of an HIV test to the British Boxing Board of Control. He was subsequently barred from boxing by the Zimbabwe authorities and stripped of his national title.

=== Style and Persona ===
Kilimanjaro was known for his intimidating size, powerful jab and right hand, and theatrical entrances. He fought and defeated several regional fighters with flamboyant nicknames such as Black Tiger, Kid Power, Captain Marvel, George Foreman (not the American), and JukeBox TimeBomb he also fought George Chaplin who had defeated Earnie shavers, lottie mwale former world title challenger, Hughroy Currie former British champion & southern area champion, Horace Notice undefeated British and commonwealth champion .

=== International Ambitions ===
At his peak, Kilimanjaro was ranked #14 in the world by the WBC, and ranked #2 in the Commonwealth sparking international interest. A highly anticipated bout was arranged with Lennox Lewis in 1990 at Crystal Palace, London. However, the fight was abruptly canceled moments before it began due to Kilimanjaro’s failure to produce a required HIV test certificate.

=== Final fight/retirement ===
In 1990 Kilimanjaro would go on a business trip to Côte d’Ivoire where he would be offered a fight with Victor Iwunze (nicknamed baby Tyson) on a non title bout. Kilimanjaro weighed 115 kg and had 2 days of training to prepare for the bout; those 2 days where not enough to get him in shape, and on the 5th of May 1990 Kilimanjaro would compete in his last fight. It was said in his biography, "the man of the mountain that the fans witnessed a vastly different man on display an immobile gun shy African champion on display was outpointed by baby Tyson over 8/12 rounds baby Tyson was warned multiple times for illegal fouls baby Tyson would win by points some sources say it to be 12 rounds some say 8 rounds."

When Kilimanjaro arrived back in Harare the Zimbabwe boxing and wrestling federation scrutinised Kilimanjaro for fighting without authorisation to preempt impending action by the board Kilimanjaro announced he would be relinquishing his Zimbabwean heavyweight championship due to the lack of challengers the board would announce he would be stripped of his titles and he would no longer be eligible to fight in the common wealth until he provided a negative HIV/Aids test the Abu would then announce Kilimanjaro would be stripped of his continental title without his titles Kilimanjaro’s career was effectively over.

Kilimanjaro was never knocked down or legitimately knocked out during his boxing career the only methods that he had lost were either technical knockout or a points decision he was known to be very durable during his career. He retired with a record of 32 wins and 7 defeats.

== Death ==
At age 36, Kilimanjaro became sick, and was treated by a witch doctor who could not save him. He was taken to hospital in Parirenyatwa, where doctors and nurses battled to treat the diarrhoea, he was suffering from. After five days, they sent him home. He was ferried back home to Mbare, to spend his last days.

He died in the Mbare house he grew up in, surrounded by people who loved him for who he was, not for what he was. He was buried three days later at his rural home in Buhera, next to his father Enos and mother Jeketai, who had died.

After suffering from AIDS-related illnesses including tuberculosis, he died on 15 February 1994, aged 36. He was buried in his home village, Buhera.
