= David Pearce (boxer) =

Welsh boxer (1959–2000)

- Pearce in 1983 with Arthur Scargill

Personal information
- Nicknames: Bomber Pearce, Welsh Rocky
- Nationality: Welsh
- Born: 8 May 1959 Pillgwenlly, Newport, Wales
- Died: 20 May 2000 (aged 41)
- Height: 5 ft 11 in (180 cm)
- Weight: Heavyweight; Cruiserweight
- Website: Tribute website

Boxing career
- Stance: Orthodox

Boxing record
- Total fights: 24
- Wins: 19
- Win by KO: 15
- Losses: 4
- Draws: 1

David "Bomber" Pearce (8 May 1959 – 20 May 2000) was a Welsh heavyweight boxing champion.

Also known as the Welsh Rocky, Pearce held both the Welsh and the British heavyweight titles and held the number one WBC cruiserweight ranking from September 1983 to September 1985. In all he won 19 (15 KO) of his 24 bouts, losing four, with one drawn. He won two of his unlicensed bouts, losing one.

== Biographical details ==
Pearce was born in Newport, Monmouthshire on 8 May 1959. He was one of nine children: seven brothers, six of whom boxed professionally and one who was a professional dancer, and two sisters. His mother was a relative of Bob Fitzsimmons.

He boxed out of St Josephs ABC in Newport and coached junior and senior boxers at Alway ABC in Newport before his death.

Soon after his final unsanctioned boxing fight in 1994, in California, Pearce became seriously ill, in later years developing epilepsy. There was no specific evidence that this had been brought on by repeated blows to the head, but he immediately retired from boxing on medical advice. He died 7 years later, at the age of 41, due to SADS (sudden adult death syndrome). The South Wales Argus described him as "Newport's most famous boxer." Around 2,500 people attended his funeral in Newport at Stow Hill Cemetery.

== Boxing career achievements ==
British heavyweight title, 1983

- Pearce won the Welsh and British heavyweight boxing titles in September 1983.
- Pearce challenged for the prestigious EBU European heavyweight title against Felipe Rodriguez and Lucien Rodriguez.
- Pearce was ranked as high as number seven in the WBA heavyweight world rankings before his career was cut short.
- Pearce was ranked number one in the WBC cruiserweight rankings after his victory against Michael "Jack" Johnson, in a WBC final eliminator in 1984.
- Pearce was scheduled to fight Buster Douglas in Columbus, Ohio, USA but was pulled out on three hours' notice. Donnie Long replaced Pearce.
- Pearce was medically retired in 1984, at the age of 24.
- Pearce came 2nd in the BBC Wales Sports Personality of the Year in 1983.
- Steve Lillis, boxing journalist and co-presenter of Box-Nation, voted David 'Bomber' Pearce in his top ten most underrated British boxing champions (Lonsdale Belt Holders) of all time.

== Welsh & British heavyweight titles ==
- Pearce suffered two setbacks on his road to the British title. A loss to Neville Meade when still only 20 and later to John Rafferty. Pearce had knocked down Rafferty before he was disqualified in the 3rd round for punching after the referee had called break.
- Pearce fought in a scheduled WBC eliminator and defeated Dennis Andries, the future three times WBC world light heavyweight world champion, in the 7th round. Dennis Andries went six years before being stopped again, this time by Thomas Hearns in the 10th round.
- Pearce, challenged and vowed to avenge his loss to Neville Meade to win the Welsh and British heavyweight titles.
- Pearce won the Welsh and British heavyweight boxing titles in September 1983 at the St David's Hall against Commonwealth gold medallist and British heavyweight champion Neville Meade. Although the Welsh title was won on the night, the title had to be relinquished by Pearce, due to his commitments of becoming British heavyweight champion.

== European heavyweight title (EBU) ==
- Pearce earned a draw with Felipe Rodriquez whilst fighting the EBU heavyweight title challenger.
- Pearce lost his title fight for the European heavyweight title against Lucien Rodriguez who had won 14 of his last 15 fights after earning the number one EBU ranking.

== Unsanctioned bouts ==
Pearce won two (both knockouts) of his three unlicensed bouts. Pearce took a fight with Percell Davis of Detroit at two days' notice but was stopped in the eighth round.

Pearce later had a second wind after sparring against Lennox Lewis who was in preparation for the Lewis–Glenn McCrory fight and decided to train once more for his final comeback in California, USA. Pearce wanted to go out on a high after his unprepared previous trip to the states and trained diligently with his brother Gary Pearce.

In 1994 Pearce competed in two bouts that took place in Bakersfield, California. In his first bout he fought Mary Konate and in his second bout he fought the former heavyweight world champion John Tate. The South Wales Argus and the Californian press likened Pearce to the fighter Philo Beddoe, who was portrayed in the films Every Which Way but Loose and Any Which Way You Can.

== Professional boxing record / Unsanctioned bouts ==
19 Wins (15 knockouts, 4 decisions), 4 Losses (2 knockouts, 2 decisions), 1 Draw
Result	Record	Opponent	Type	Round	Date	Location	Notes
Win	34-3	(United States) John Tate	TKO	3	10 June 1994	Hilton Hotel, Bakersfield, California, United States	Unsanctioned Bout
Win	16-6	(Mali) Mary Konate	TKO	1	12 April 1994	Hilton Hotel, Bakersfield, California, United States	Unsanctioned Bout
Loss	13-9	(United States) Percell Davis	TKO	8	10 December 1990	Hyatt Regency Hotel, Dearborn, Michigan, United States	Unsanctioned Bout Pearce took the fight on 2 days' notice
Loss	36-8-1	(France) Lucien Rodriguez	PTS	12	30 March 1984	Palais des Sports de Beaublanc, Limoges, Haute-Vienne, France	EBU Heavyweight Title. Rodriguez took standing 8 count in round 3, and dropped heavily twice in round 8.
Win	11-2	(United States) Michael Johnson	TKO	5	28 January 1984	(England) Victoria Hall, Hanley, Staffordshire, United Kingdom	Johnson hurt from uppercut and turned his back to retire
Win	20-12-1	(Wales) Neville Meade	TKO	9	22 September 1983	St David's Hall, Cardiff, Wales, United Kingdom	BBBofC Wales Heavyweight Title. BBBofC British Heavyweight Title. Referee stopped the bout at 2:57 of round 9.
Win	35-4-2	(Belgium) Albert Syben	KO	1	7 April 1983	(England) Lyceum Ballroom, The Strand, London, United Kingdom	Syben knocked out at 2:25 of the first round
Draw	24-5-3	(Spain) Felipe Rodriquez	PTS	10	7 December 1982	(England) Royal Albert Hall, Kensington, London, United Kingdom	Vacant EBU Heavyweight Title. 98-98
Win	20-5	(Northern Ireland) Gordon Ferris	KO	5	1 June 1982	(England) Royal Albert Hall, Kensington, London, United Kingdom	BBBofC British Heavyweight Title Eliminator. Final Eliminator for BBBofC British Heavyweight Title; Ferris down in round 3 and stopped in round 5 failed to meet the count at 1:44 of the fifth round.
Win	13-4-1	(United Kingdom) Dennis Andries	TKO	7	12 October 1981	(England) Bloomsbury Centre Hotel, Bloomsbury, London, United Kingdom	Andries heavily down in Rd 6, from an uppercut. Down twice in Rd 7 before referee stopped the bout at 2:15 of the seventh round.
Win	15-9	(United Kingdom) Ishaq Hussein	TKO	1	8 June 1981	(England) Porter Tun Rooms, Moorgate, United Kingdom	time: 2:03 referee stopped fight on 2nd knockdown.
Win	4-0	(United Kingdom) Larry McDonald	KO	3	16 March 1981	(England) National Sporting Club, Piccadilly, London, United Kingdom	McDonald down heavily in the third from a left hook to the body
Win	15-27-1	(Wales) Bonny McKenzie	PTS	8	2 March 1981	(England) National Sporting Club, Piccadilly, London, United Kingdom	79.5-78.5
loss	2-1	(Scotland) John Rafferty	DQ	3	26 January 1981	St. Andrew's Sporting Club, Glasgow, Scotland, United Kingdom	Pearce disqualified at 1:32 of the third round due to hitting a downed opponent, Rafferty, down 4 times before the DQ. The decision was disputed through the official channels via Pearce's trainer and promoter.
Loss	14-11-1	(Wales) Neville Meade	TKO	2	22 January 1980	(Wales) Double Diamond Club, Caerphilly, United Kingdom	BBBofC Wales Heavyweight Title. Referee stopped the bout at 2:48 of the second round.
Win	8-3	(United Kingdom) Denton Ruddock	TKO	7	30 October 1979	(Wales) Double Diamond Club, Caerphilly, United Kingdom	
Win	8-12	(United Kingdom) Theo Josephs	TKO	3	5 July 1979	(Wales) Afan Lido, Port Talbot, United Kingdom	time: 2:35 of Rd 2 Josephs was down in the third.
Win	7-3	(Wales) Winston Allen	PTS	6	3 April 1979	(Wales) Caerphilly, United Kingdom	£1000 Heavyweight Competition Final 58½-59½, Allen was down in the fourth.
Win	11-14	(Wales) Bonny McKenzie	PTS	8	19 February 1979	(England) Mayfair Sporting Club, Mayfair, London, United Kingdom	McKenzie down in sixth and seventh. 79-78
Win	1-0-1	(United Kingdom) Mal Tetley	KO	1	22 January 1979	(England) Mayfair, London, United Kingdom	£2000 heavyweight competition semi final. time 0:15 of Rd 1.
Win	4-3	(United Kingdom) Bobby Hennessey	TKO	2	22 January 1979	(England) Mayfair, London, United Kingdom	£2000 Heavyweight Competition Final
Win	6-10	(United Kingdom) Theo Josephs	PTS	8	11 December 1978	Plymouth, Devon, United Kingdom	79-78
Win	0-1	(United Kingdom) Bob Bleau	KO	1	1 December 1978	(Kent) Minster-in-Thanet, United Kingdom	KO time: 0:50.
Win	--	(United Kingdom) Osborne Taylor	TKO	1	15 November 1978	Merthyr Tydfil, Wales, United Kingdom	£1,000 heavyweight competition semi final. time: 0:38 of Rd 1.

== Pearce Brothers ==
- Walter 'Bimbo' Pearce the eldest son of Wally Pearce was a professional boxer, Bimbo won 5 amateur titles from Light Welterweight to Heavyweight including beating 4 British champions in bouts during the ABA exile.
- Raymond Pearce, a middleweight who notably fought Winston Burnett, and the future three times WBC world Light Heavyweight champion Dennis Andries. A United States citizen, and married to an USAF Officer. He also worked as an Elvis impersonator across the world and died, on the 1 January 2022, in Minnesota, United States.
- Gary Pearce had thirty-one professional bouts, including winning the Welsh Area Super Welterweight title and facing Hans Henrick-Palm the World number 5 in Randers, Denmark in 1981.
- Ronald Pearce fought Paul Wetter and Robert Smith the now BBBoC General secretary.
- Nigel Pearce had five fights as a professional boxer.
- Simon Pearce the seventh brother graduated from Italia Conti Academy of Theatre Arts and subsequently went on to star in Starlight Express, Cats, Les Misérables and Mousetrap musicals in the West End.

== Gallery ==
Pearce aged 3

David 'Bomber' Pearce

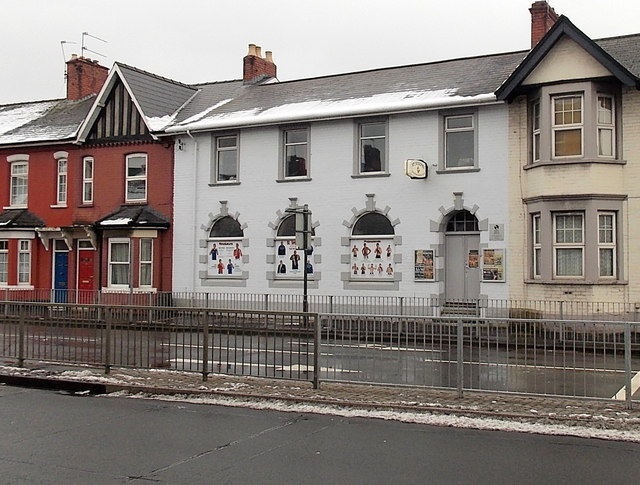
St Josephs Amateur Boxing Club, George Street, Newport

Boxing contract

Bimbo Pearce defeating the Central Light-Heavyweight Champion

Pearce at Newport County AFC

Pearce turning professional

Oil painting of Pearce

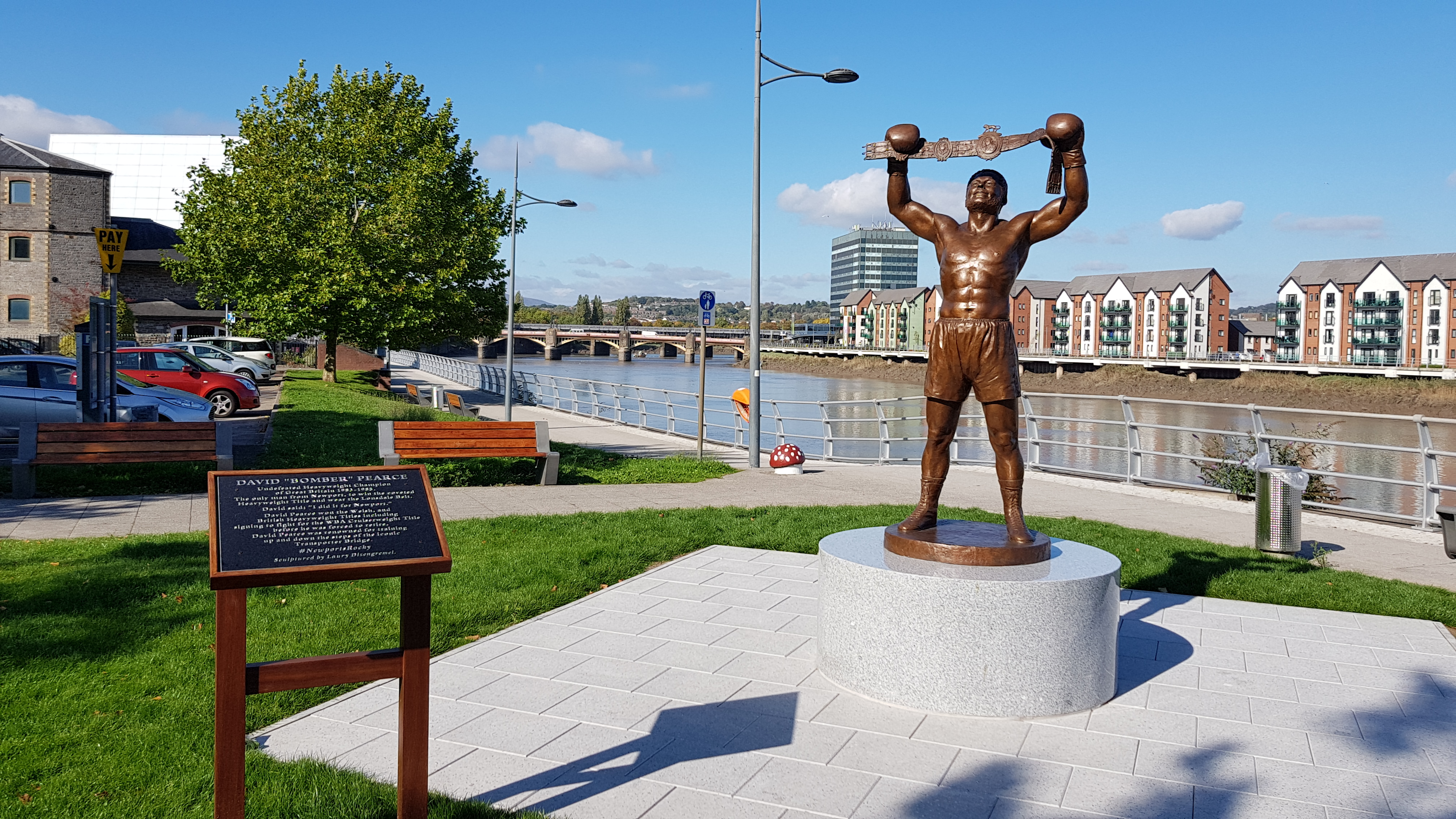
Sculpture near Riverfront, Newport

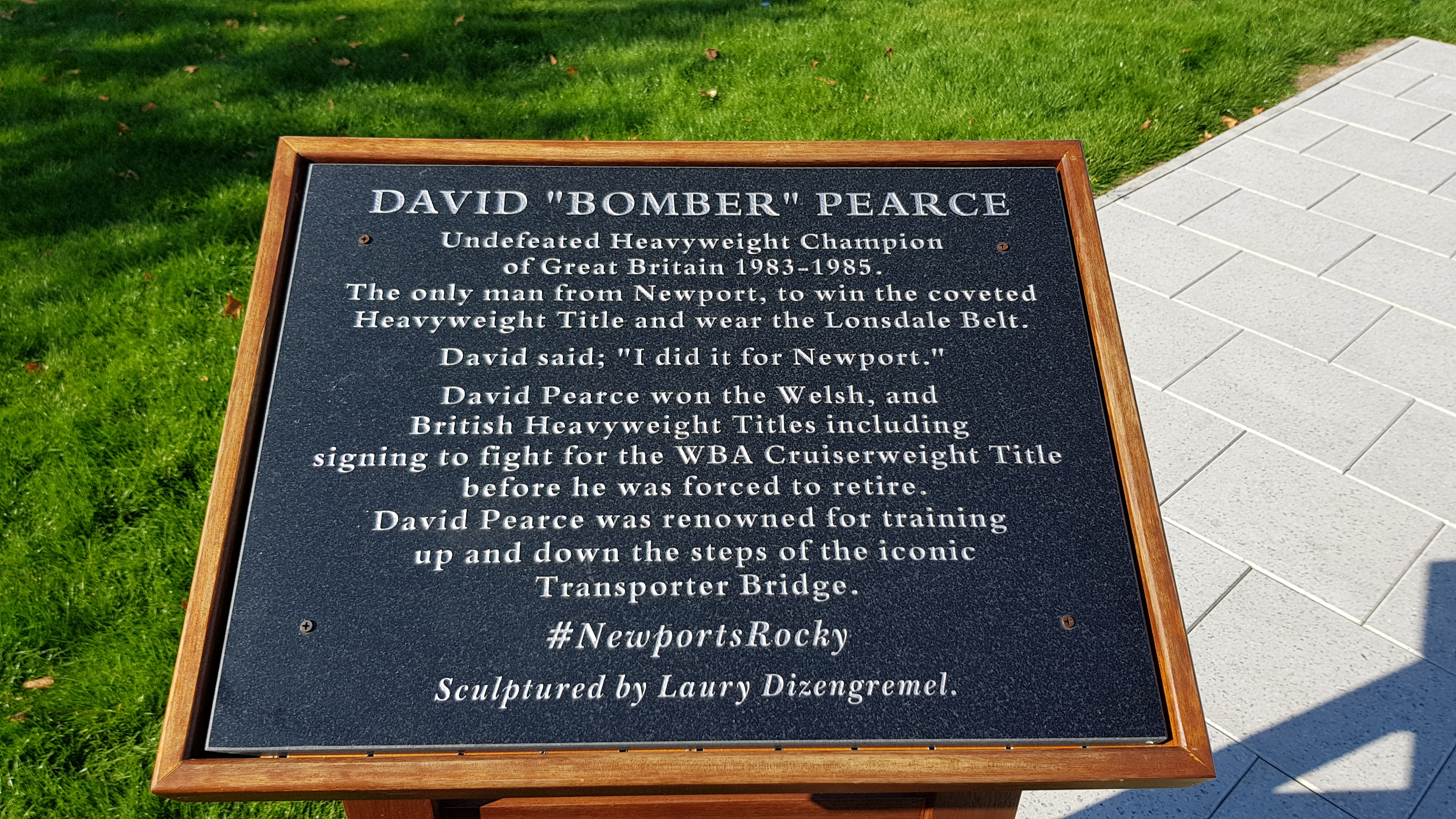
Dedication plaque for sculpture

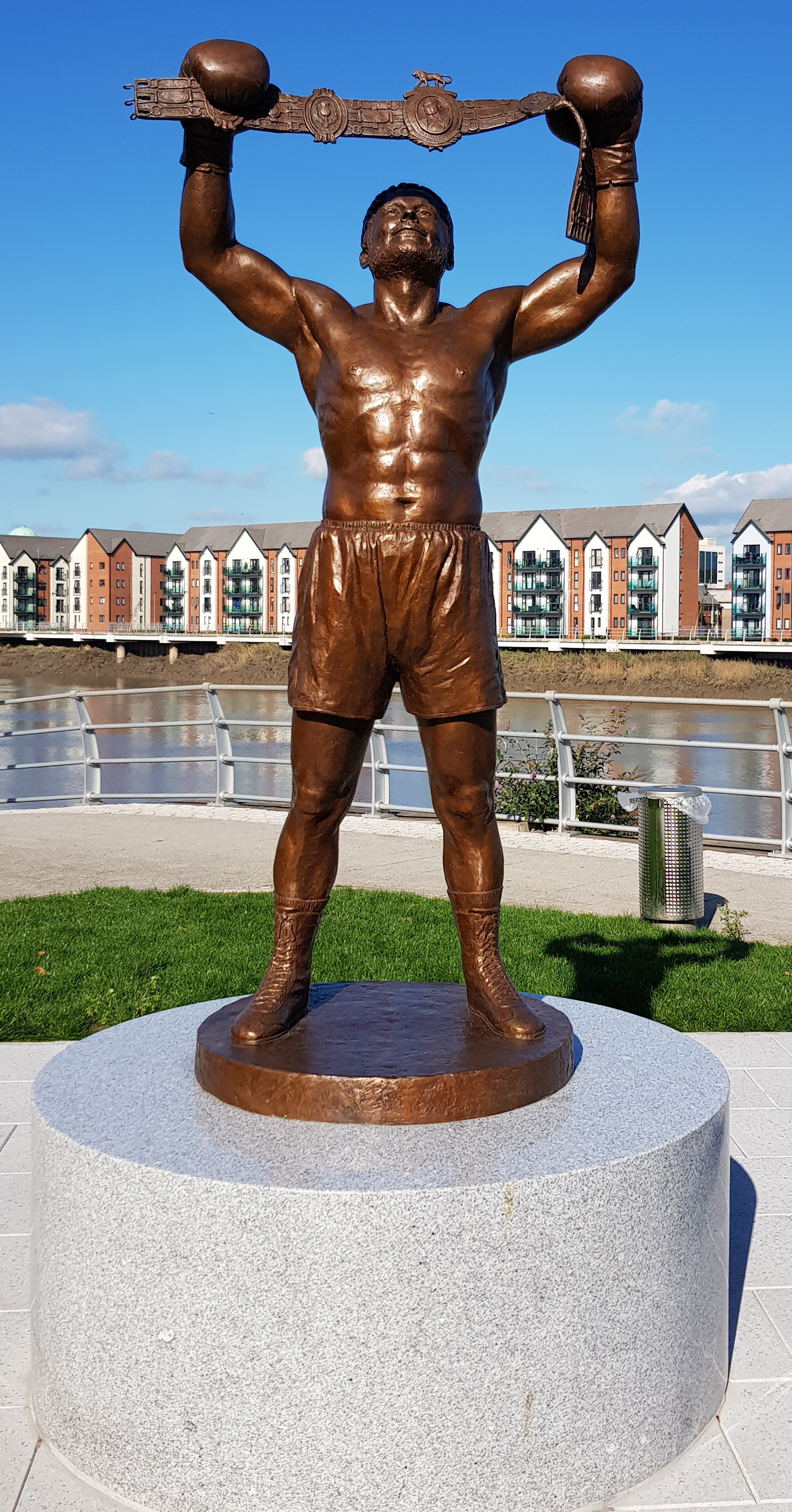
Sculpture near Riverfront, Newport
