= Kanice =

Kanice may refer to places:

== Czech Republic ==
- Kanice (Brno-Country District), a municipality and village in the South Moravian Region
- Kanice (Domažlice District), a municipality and village in the Plzeň Region
- Kanice, a village and part of Petrovice (Hradec Králové District) in the Hradec Králové Region

== Poland ==
- Kanice, Lower Silesian Voivodeship (south-west Poland)
- Kanice, Łódź Voivodeship (central Poland)
- Kanice, West Pomeranian Voivodeship (north-west Poland)
