= Franciszka Siedliska =

Polish beatified Religious Sister and foundress

Blessed Maria Franciszka Siedliska CSFN
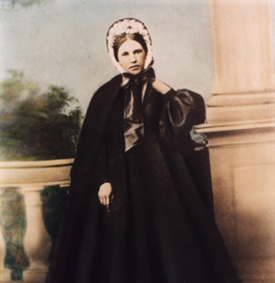
- Born: 12 November 1842; Roszkowa Wola, Rzeczyca, Congress Poland
- Died: November 21, 1902 (aged 60); Rome, Kingdom of Italy
- Venerated in: Catholic Church
- Beatified: 23 April 1989, Saint Peter's Square, Vatican City by Pope John Paul II
- Feast: 21 November
- Attributes: Religious habit
- Patronage: Sisters of the Holy Family of Nazareth; Polish missionaries

Maria Franciszka Siedliska, CSFN (12 November 1842 – 21 November 1902), known in religion as Maria of Jesus the Good Shepherd, was a Polish Catholic nun who founded the Sisters of the Holy Family of Nazareth in 1875.

In childhood Siedliska was indifferent to her faith but after a local priest had converted her she became aware of a call to the religious life which her parents opposed. However the death of her father in 1870 enabled her to pursue her vocation. In 1873 she decided to found a religious congregation that received the blessing of Pope Pius IX before being established during Advent in 1875. Siedliska expanded her congregation from Rome to her native Poland and elsewhere, including Great Britain, France and the USA where she visited during her extensive travels.

The beatification process for the late nun opened in 1941 under Pope Pius XII. She was declared a Servant of God, then confirmed as having led a life of heroic virtue. She was named Venerable on 29 April 1980 and in 1989 Pope John Paul II beatified her.

== Life ==
Franciszka Siedliska was born on 12 November 1842, the eldest child of Szlachta members, Adolf Adam Siedliski and Cecylia Marianna Morawska, of Jewish descent, in Roszkowa Wola, Poland.

She received a private education from governesses in a household indifferent to faith, until she met the zealous Franciscan Capuchin priest, Leander Lendzian, who prepared her for her First Communion on 1 May 1855 when she resolved to offer herself to God. She had met the priest in Warsaw at an event her grandfather was hosting in November 1854. Siedliska wanted to pursue a religious vocation around 1860 but her parents opposed the idea. Her father said he would rather see her dead than become a nun. In 1860 she moved with her parents to Switzerland then went on to Prussia and to France. Her frail health led her parents to seek treatment for her in Murano and Cannes before the family returned to Poland in 1865.

The death of her father in 1870 allowed her the freedom to pursue her dream and she became part of the Third Order of Saint Francis in 1870 in Lublin. On 12 April 1873 with guidance from Father Lendzian she was encouraged to found an order inspired by the notion that "it was God's will that she should do so". Siedliska was granted a private audience with Pope Pius IX on 1 October 1873 and "her idea" received his apostolic blessing; she founded her new congregation in Rome at the beginning of Advent in 1875.

Siedliska made her solemn profession as a nun on 1 May 1884 and took the religious name of "Maria of Jesus, the Good Shepherd". The congregation spread at a rapid rate across Europe. She arrived in New York Harbor on 4 July 1885 and was in Chicago to open schools on 6 July 1885. Siedliska led eleven sisters to found a community in Des Plaines, then opened a house in Pittsburgh a decade later, in August 1895. In Rome she presided over religious exercises and held conferences and wrote letters of encouragement to more than 29 foundations. She travelled to Paris in 1892 and to London in 1895. She returned to Rome after several extensive travels on 16 October 1902 and was never to leave again due to failing health.

Siedliska died in Rome on 21 November 1902 from acute peritonitis she had suffered for six days. Her remains were buried at Campo Verano on 24 November and were relocated on 9 July 1953 to the order's motherhouse at 18 Via Machiavelli. On 29 September 1966 they were relocated again to the new generalate of the order at 400, Via Nazareth. Her order has numbered more than 1500 religious and ranges from places like Israel to Australia. Her order received a papal decree of praise from Pope Leo XIII on 1 September 1896 and then definitive papal approval from Pope Pius XI on 4 June 1923. In 2005 there were 152 houses with 1490 religious but in 2015 the number fell to 1300.

== Beatification ==
Her beatification process opened in Rome with an informative process that Cardinal Basilio Pompili inaugurated on 4 April 1922 and later closed in January 1928; testimonies were collected from Paris, London and from Chicago on account of her extensive missions to those places. Her writings received the approval of theologians on 27 November 1937 who determined that her spiritual writings did not contravene official doctrine. The formal introduction to the cause came under Pope Pius XII on 5 February 1941 and she received the title of Servant of God as a result. Cardinal Francesco Marchetti Selvaggiani oversaw the apostolic process from 6 June 1941 to 6 March 1946 with additional testimonies coming again from places she had visited in her lifetime. The Congregation for Rites validated the previous processes on 2 March 1952 and the Congregation for the Causes of Saints and their consultants met and approved her cause on 21 June 1979; the C.C.S. alone approved it later on 22 February 1980. Pope John Paul II confirmed her life of heroic virtue and named her Venerable on 29 April 1980.

The miracle needed for beatification was investigated in Warsaw in a diocesan process overseen by Cardinal Józef Glemp from 21 February to 9 June 1986. The C.C.S. validated this process in Rome on 21 November 1986 before a medical board approved it on 18 November 1987. Theologians also assented to this on 15 April 1988 as did the C.C.S. on 5 July 1988 before John Paul II gave the final approval needed for it on 1 September 1988. John Paul II beatified Siedliska on 23 April 1989.
