= Sadykierz =

Sadykierz may refer to the following places in Poland:

- Sadykierz, Łódź Voivodeship (central Poland)
- Sadykierz, Maków County in Masovian Voivodeship (east-central Poland)
- Sadykierz, Ropczyce-Sędziszów County in Subcarpathian Voivodeship (south-east Poland)
- Sadykierz, Pułtusk County in Masovian Voivodeship (east-central Poland)
