= Bartoszówka =

Bartoszówka may refer to the following places in Poland:

- Bartoszówka, Lower Silesian Voivodeship (south-west Poland)
- Bartoszówka, Łódź Voivodeship (central Poland)
- Bartoszówka, Masovian Voivodeship (east-central Poland)
