= Gustawów =

Gustawów may refer to the following places:

- Gustawów, Łódź Voivodeship (central Poland)
- Gustawów, Gmina Fałków in Świętokrzyskie Voivodeship (south-central Poland)
- Gustawów, Gmina Stąporków in Świętokrzyskie Voivodeship (south-central Poland)
- Gustawów, Lipsko County in Masovian Voivodeship (east-central Poland)
- Gustawów, Radom County in Masovian Voivodeship (east-central Poland)
- Gustawów, Greater Poland Voivodeship (west-central Poland)
- Gustawów, Silesian Voivodeship (south Poland)
