= Impalement in myth and art =

The use of impalement in myth, art, and literature includes mythical representations of it as a method of execution and other uses in paintings, sculptures, and the like, folklore and other tales in which impalement is related to magical or supernatural properties, and the use of simulated impalement for the purposes of entertainment.

== Europe ==
=== Vampires and other undead ===
The idea that the vampire "can only be slain with a stake driven through its heart" has been pervasive in European fiction. Examples such as Bram Stoker's Dracula (with Dracula often being compared to Vlad the Impaler who killed his enemies and impaled them on wooden spikes) and the more recent Buffy the Vampire Slayer both incorporate that idea. In classic European folklore, it was believed that one method, among several, to "kill" a vampire, or prevent a corpse from rising as a vampire, was to drive a wooden stake through the heart before interment. In one story, an Istrian peasant named Jure Grando died and was buried in 1656. It was believed that he returned as a vampire, and at least one villager tried to drive a stake through his heart, but failed in the attempt. Finally, in 1672, the corpse was decapitated, and the vampire terror was put to rest. Although the Eastern European, in particular Slavic (but also Romanian), conception of the vampire as an undead creature in which impaling it was central to either destroying it, or at least immobilizing it, is the most well-known European tradition, such traditions can also be found elsewhere in Europe. In Greece, the troublesome undead were usually called a vrykolakas. The archaeologist Susan-Marie Cronkite describes an odd grave found at Mytilene, at Lesbos, a find the archeologists connected with the vrykolakas superstition.

The Norse draugr, or haugbui (mound-dweller), was a type of undead typically (but not exclusively) associated with those put (supposedly) to rest in burial mounds/tumuli. The approved methods of killing a draugr are "to sever his head from his body and set the same beneath his rump, or impale his body with a stake or burn it to ashes".

Although in modern vampiric lore, the stake is regarded as a very effective tool against the undead, people in pre-modern Europe could have their doubts. Edward Payson Evans tells the following story, from the city Kadaň:

In 1337, a herdsman near the town of Cadan came forth from his grave every night, visiting the villages, terrifying the inhabitants, conversing affably with some and murdering others. Every person, with whom he associated, was doomed to die within eight days and to wander as a vampire after death. In order to keep him in his grave, a stake was driven through his body, but he only laughed at this clumsy attempt to impale a ghost, saying: "You have really rendered me a great service by providing me with a staff, with which to ward off dogs when I go out to walk"

=== Literary treatment of impalement ===
A graphic description of the vertical impalement of a Serbian rebel by Ottoman authorities can be found in Ivo Andrić's novel The Bridge on the Drina. Andrić was later awarded the Nobel Prize for Literature for the whole of his literary contribution, though this novel was the magnum opus.

=== Anecdotes of the impaled ===
Some anecdotes of the behavior and fates of the impaled remain which, if true, would be unique in the history of impalement. The first was narrated as a proof of the efficacy of praying to Saint Barbara. In the woods of Bohemia around 1552, there was a robber band roaming, plundering and murdering innocent travelers. A manhunt was organized, and the robber chief was apprehended and sentenced to be impaled. While one of his associates, likewise impaled, swiftly expired, the chief was not so lucky. All day long, he writhed on his stake, begging to be killed, but all in vain. That night, in his despair, he prayed to St. Barbara that he was truly sorry for all his evil doings in life and that all he hoped for was to reconcile with God and to be graced with a good death. Seemingly in response, the man's stake broke, and with great effort and pain, he managed to de-impale himself. Crawling along, he came to a house, and his cries of help were heard. He was helped into a bed, and a priest was sent for. The former robber chief then gave his death bed confession, grieving over his misspent life, but properly grateful to God and St. Barbara. He then died in peace, his hands folded over his chest.

Another incident, which was, allegedly, partially witnessed by the editor of a "Ladies' Journal", is said to have occurred in Wallachia in the 1770s. He had been present in Arad when 27 robbers had been impaled. It was strictly forbidden to give the impaled persons any water, but one woman took mercy on one of the robbers, and fetched water for him in a kettle. As she was glancing anxiously about to check if anyone took notice of her forbidden act of mercy, the robber smashed her head in with the kettle, killing her on the spot. The editor avers he was present when the robber was asked why he had done such a thing, and he merely replied he had done it on a whim, and just had felt like killing her then and there.

== Americas ==
In British Columbia, a folk tale from the Lillooet People is preserved in which impalement occurs as a central element. A man became suspicious of his wife because she went out each day to gather roots and cedar-bark but hardly ever brought anything home. One day, he spied on her, and discovered that she was cavorting with Lynx, rather than doing her wifely duties. The next day, he asked to accompany her, and they went out in the forest, and came at last to a very tall tree. The man climbed to the top of it, the wife following. The jealous man then sharpened the top of the tree with his knife, and impaled his wife on it. On his way down, he removed the bark of the tree, so it became slick. The woman cried out her pain and her brothers heard her. They and animals they called to help them tried to rescue her, but the stem was too slick for them to climb up to reach her. Then Snail offered to help her, and slowly crawled up the tree. But alas, Snail moved too slowly, and by the time it took him to reach the top of the tree, the woman was dead.

Among tribes living around the Titicaca, tales circulated in the sixteenth century that prior to the Incas, a mysterious group of white men lived there, and their banishment was somehow connected with the birth of the Sun. A sixteenth century tale collected by a Spanish missionary tells of such an individual, called Tanupa or Taapac, who was impaled by other Indians around the Titicaca, and a shrine was set up there to commemorate the events.

== Martyrdom of al-Hallaj ==
The renowned Sufi mystic was in AD 922 to be impaled for blasphemy in Baghdad, for having said such things as "I am God". However, the executioners were unable to do so, because al-Hallaj floated in the air just above their reach. Then, al-Hallaj's spirit ascended to Heaven, and conversed with Muhammed, the Prophet of Islam, and al-Hallaj asked the Prophet if he should let himself be impaled. The Prophet acknowledged that al-Hallaj's spiritual state was so heightened that his utterance "I am God" was both just and true, but that for the sake of ordinary people, he should let himself be impaled, because their spiritual state was such that they would be misled from practical religion if they were to believe in such sayings like "I am God". And thus, for the sake of preserving the religion of ordinary people, al-Hallaj let himself be impaled at last.

== Orientalism ==
Tales and anecdotes concerning how dreadfully swift and harsh Ottoman justice was for comparatively trivial offenses abound. Dimitrie Cantemir, a Moldavian noble living in Constantinople at the end of the 17th century, and often engaged in pleas of cases towards Ottoman authorities, narrates a tale from the building of a great mosque there in 1461. The Greek architect was amply rewarded by the sultan, so that a whole street was privileged to the Greek populace in recognition of his efforts. However, some asked the architect if he could even build a greater and more beautiful mosque than the one completed. Incautiously, the architect said sure enough, if I were given the materials. The sultan, upon hearing this, was so fearful that his successors might create an even more beautiful mosque than his own, that just in case, he chose to impale the architect to deprive successors of that genius, commemorating the event by erecting a huge iron spike in the middle of the mosque. Not even bothering to refute this tale of impalement, Cantemir says that he does, however, believe in the grand gift of the street, because he had used the original charter from the sultan to protect the Greek interest when somebody wanted to deprive the Greeks of the privilege. Cantemir won his case. In 1632, under Murad IV (r.1623–40), a hapless interpreter in a fierce dispute between the French ambassador and Ottoman authorities was impaled alive for faithfully translating the insolent words of the ambassador. Furthermore, Murad IV sought to ban the use of tobacco, and reportedly impaled alive a man and a woman for breaking the law, the one for selling tobacco, the other for using it. Another such anecdote is said to have occurred in 1695 under Mustafa II: The Grand Vizier prevented access to the sultan to a poor shoemaker who had a petition for his sovereign. Once the sultan learnt of it, he promptly ordered the Grand Vizier to be impaled, although the Grand Vizier was the son of the sultan's favourite concubine.

== Indian sub-continent ==
In the Hindu Draupadi cult, impalement of animals, demons, and humans is a recurring motif within legends and symbolic re-enactments during holidays/festivals.

According to a Shaivite story from India, under the old Pandyan Dynasty, ruling from 500 BC-1500 CE, the 7th century King Koon Pandiyan had 8000 Jains impaled in Madurai. Some historians regard the story as a legend rather than historically accurate, and that it might have been created by the Shaivites to prove their superiority over the Jains. This act, legendary or not, is still commemorated in "lurid mural representations" in several Hindu temples in Tamil Nadu. An example of such depictions in temples can be found in the Meenakshi Amman Temple in Madurai, around the holy tank enclosure to the shrine of Meenakshi. There, a long line of impaled Jaines are depicted, with dogs at their feet, licking up the blood, and crows flying around to pick out their eyes.

In Bengal, tales existed about a foolish king in the Pala Empire, Bhava Chandra, and his equally foolish minister. They are a pair not unlike the Wise Men of Gotham, bereft of common sense as a result of a curse laid upon them. In their last judgment, they had condemned two robbers to be impaled, but when the robbers began quarreling about who should get impaled on the longest pole, Bhava Chandra and his minister became deeply intrigued. The robbers told them that whoever died on the longest pole would be reincarnated as the ruler of the Earth, while the other would become his minister. Thinking it unseemly that two mere robbers should gain such a high position in their next life, Bhava Chandra chose to impale himself on the longest pole, while his minister happily chose to die on the shorter.

The remains of persons impaled have, occasionally, been thought imbued with certain magical properties. For example, the Arthashastra states that if one wishes to make a fire at one place, and prevent any other fire to be lit there, one could make that fire "by the friction of a black-and-white bamboo stick on the rib bone of the left side of a man who has been slain with a sword, or impaled". Virginia Saunders also mentions from the same text how to become invisible:

Or if invisibility is desired, having fasted three nights one should, on the day of the star Pushya, sprinkle with the milk of goats and sheep, barley planted in soil placed in the skull of a man who has been killed by a sword or has been impaled.

The ascetic Mandavya, when he was five years old, had amused himself with sticking a reed into a living locust. Lord Yama, the god of death, bided his time to exact what he thought was a proper punishment. As an old man, Mandavya was sitting outside his cave in deep meditation, oblivious to some thieves placing their stolen goods there. Wrongfully believing Mandavya had stolen the goods, the authorities placed Mandavya on trial. He could not answer the judge on how the goods had come to be in his hermitage, so the king declared he was to be impaled. Mandavya seemed unperturbed by the whole affair, and when he was still alive, in deep contemplation, on the stake after 4 years, the king declared Mandavya had to be innocent, and ordered him pulled down. However, the stake broke inside Mandavya's body, and the excruciating pain destroyed Mandavya's trance. In deep bitterness, he asked the gods how he had deserved such a fate, and Yama answered it was because of the locust he had tortured as a young boy. Mandavya became infuriated at Yama and pointed out how disproportionate the punishment had been. He then cursed Yama to be born as a human being, namely as Vidura, the son of a mere serving maid.

A tale from Kashmir of reincarnation after death on the stake concerns the sage Samdhimati. Samdhimati was minister under King Jayendra, when a mysterious prophecy spread through the populace: "To Samdhimati will belong the kingdom". Jayendra, on hearing of this, threw Samdhimati in prison for 10 years. When the king was on his death bed, he was unwilling to let Samdhimati have the prophecy fulfilled, so he ordered Samdhimati impaled. When Samdhimati's guru Isana heard of this, he went to the cemetery where Samhimati was impaled in order to perform the proper funeral rites. The wolves had devoured all the flesh of the body, and Isana was amazed that the prophecy was inscribed on Samdhimati's skull that he was to inherit the kingdom. Keeping watch, one night Isana saw the graveyard was filled with Yoginis (female mystics/witches). The Yoginis were drunk and "lustful for a man", and provided the skeleton with flesh (not the least, a penis) from their own bodies. They then captured Samdhimati's spirit, which was still hovering around, within the fleshed skeleton, and "spent the rest of the night sporting with him". As dawn approached, Isana, afraid that Samdhimati's new body should be dissolved by the witches, rushed out from his hiding place, and chased them away. In his new body and life, Samdhimati became known as Aryaraja, and was, indeed, crowned as King of Kashmir, thereby fulfilling the prophecy.

== Eastern Asia ==
In the Buddhist conception of the eight Hells, as John Bowring relates from Siam, those consigned for the Sixth Hell are impaled on spits and roasted. When well roasted, enormous dogs with iron teeth devour them. But, the damned are reborn, and must relive this punishment for 16000 years, over and over again ... Another tale popular in Siam was about Devadatta, a wily antagonist to Buddha seeking to undermine Gautama's position among his followers. For this crime, Devadatta was sent off into the very deepest Hell, the Avici, being impaled on three great iron spears in a sea of flames.

== Illusions of impalement ==
The 1980 Italian film, Cannibal Holocaust, directed by Ruggero Deodato, graphically depicts impalement. The story follows a rescue party searching for a missing documentary film crew in the Amazon rainforest. The film's depiction of indigenous tribes, death of animals on set, and the graphic violence (notably the impalement scene) brought on a great deal of controversy, legal investigations, boycotts and protests by concerned social groups, bans in many countries (some of which are still in effect), and heavy censorship in countries where it has not been banned. The impalement scene was so realistic, that Deodato was charged with murder at one point. Deodato had to produce evidence that the "impaled" actress was alive in the aftermath of the scene, and had to further explain how the special effect was done: the actress sat on a bicycle seat mounted to a pole while she looked up and held a short stake of balsa wood in her mouth. The charges were dropped.

In stage magic, the illusion of impalement is a popular feat of magic that appears to be an act of impalement. Impaling tricks are not, however, a modern European invention, and some dervish orders performed such acts already in the 18th century. Carsten Niebuhr, traveling the Middle East 1761–67 on a Danish funded expedition, saw such a display at Basra:

The scene was in the open air, and in the court of the mosque, which was illuminated with only three lamps. Several Mullahs and dervises began with singing some passages out of the Koran. They continued to sing, with the accompaniment of some drums; and, during the music, the other dervises arose, took the sharp pointed irons, and did as if they were piercing their bodies, and even driving the irons with mallets into their flesh. Next appeared the principal actor, who, assuming an air of inspiration, directed the music to proceed, and to be raised to higher animation, in, order to assist his enthusiasm, or rather to stun the ears of the spectators. In his extacy, he threw up his turban in the air, loosened his hair; for this order of dervises wear their hair; and pierced his body with five lances: then mounting upon a low building, upon which a pole, sixteen feet long, and shod with a sharp iron point, had been set up, he impaled himself upon the pole, and was carried in this condition through the square. It was an affecting sight, to see a lean man, with a long beard, and dishevelled hair, wounded all over with spikes, and then carried about spitted upon a pole. I said, as I went away, to a Mullah of my acquaintance, that the dervise performed his tricks by means of a broad belt which he carried in his long wide drawers. The Mullah replied, that he had suspected some such art, but avoided mentioning his suspicions, lest he might draw upon himself the enmity of the order of Bed-reddin; for that one of his brethren had experienced great persecution from those dervises, in consequence of presuming to hint his doubts of the reality of their miracles.
