= Bobrowiec =

Bobrowiec may refer to the following places:

- Bobrowiec, Łódź Voivodeship (central Poland)
- Bobrowiec, Masovian Voivodeship (east-central Poland)
- Bobrowiec, Pomeranian Voivodeship (north Poland)
- Bobrowiec, Warmian-Masurian Voivodeship (north Poland)
