= Łęg, Łódź Voivodeship =

Łęg
- Village
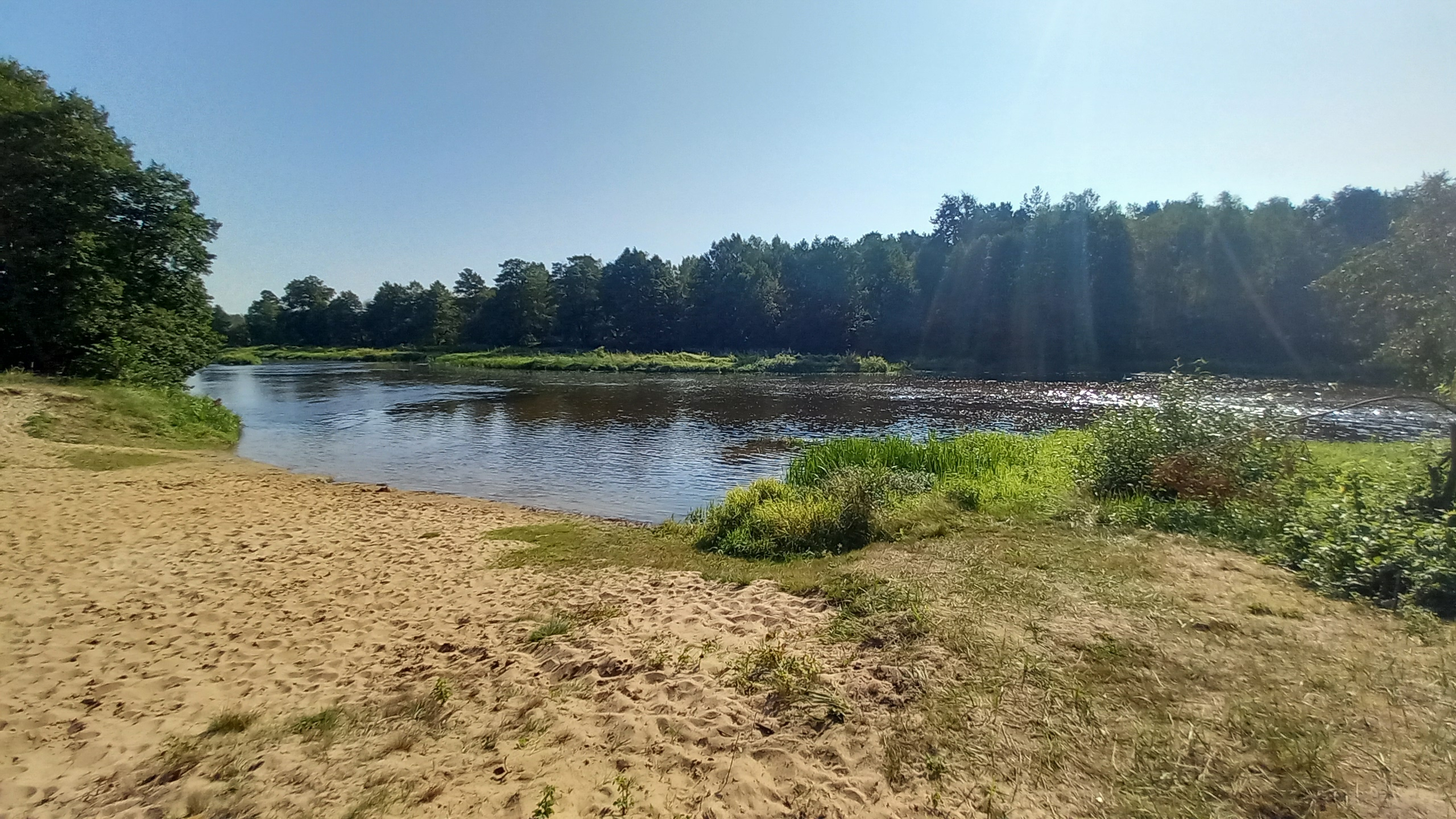

- Location within Poland
- Coordinates: 51°35′10″N 20°19′16″E
- Country: Poland
- Voivodeship: Łódź
- County: Tomaszów
- Gmina: Rzeczyca

Łęg [wɛnk] is a village in the administrative district of Gmina Rzeczyca, within Tomaszów County, Łódź Voivodeship, in central Poland.
