= Brzeg, Gmina Rzeczyca =

Brzeg
- Village
- Location within Poland
- Coordinates: 51°35′5″N 20°22′34″E
- Country: Poland
- Voivodeship: Łódź
- County: Tomaszów
- Gmina: Rzeczyca

Brzeg [bʐɛk] is a village in the administrative district of Gmina Rzeczyca, within Tomaszów County, Łódź Voivodeship, in central Poland.
