= Glina, Gmina Rzeczyca =

Glina
- Village
- Location within Poland
- Coordinates: 51°34′17″N 20°14′31″E
- Country: Poland
- Voivodeship: Łódź
- County: Tomaszów
- Gmina: Rzeczyca

Glina [ˈɡlina] is a village in the administrative district of Gmina Rzeczyca, within Tomaszów County, Łódź Voivodeship, in central Poland.
