= Zawady, Gmina Rzeczyca =

Zawady
- Village
- Location within Poland
- Coordinates: 51°36′25″N 20°14′37″E
- Country: Poland
- Voivodeship: Łódź
- County: Tomaszów
- Gmina: Rzeczyca

Zawady [zaˈvadɨ] is a village in the administrative district of Gmina Rzeczyca, within Tomaszów County, Łódź Voivodeship, in central Poland.
