= Sisters of the Holy Family of Nazareth =

Female Catholic religious congregation

Congregation of the Sisters of the Holy Family of Nazareth
- Congregatio Sororum Sacrae Familiae de Nazareth
- The coat of arms of the religious institute founded in 1875 by Blessed Mary Mother of Jesus the Good Shepherd
- Abbreviation: C.S.F.N.
- Formation: c. AD 1875; 151 years ago
- Founder: Franciszka Siedliska
- Type: Catholic religious order
- Headquarters: Italy
- Website: nazarethfamily.org

The Congregation of the Sisters of the Holy Family of Nazareth (Latin: Congregatio Sororum Sacrae Familiae de Nazareth) are a Catholic religious institute founded in Rome in 1875 by Mother Franciszka Siedliska. They use the postnominals CSFN and are an apostolic, international congregation, located on four continents and in thirteen countries.

== History ==
The Congregation of the Holy Family of Nazareth was founded in Rome, Italy in 1875 by Frances Siedliska, a Polish noblewoman. From Rome, the Congregation spread quickly.

In 1885, Mother Mary of Jesus the Good Shepherd and eleven sisters journeyed to Chicago, Illinois, where they had been invited to minister to the needs of Polish immigrant children and families. There they staffed two schools and an orphanage. The Congregation soon expanded its services in the Midwest. They continue to serve throughout Illinois, Pennsylvania, New York, Connecticut, Texas, and Ohio. The sisters operate a high school for girls, Nazareth Academy, in Philadelphia.

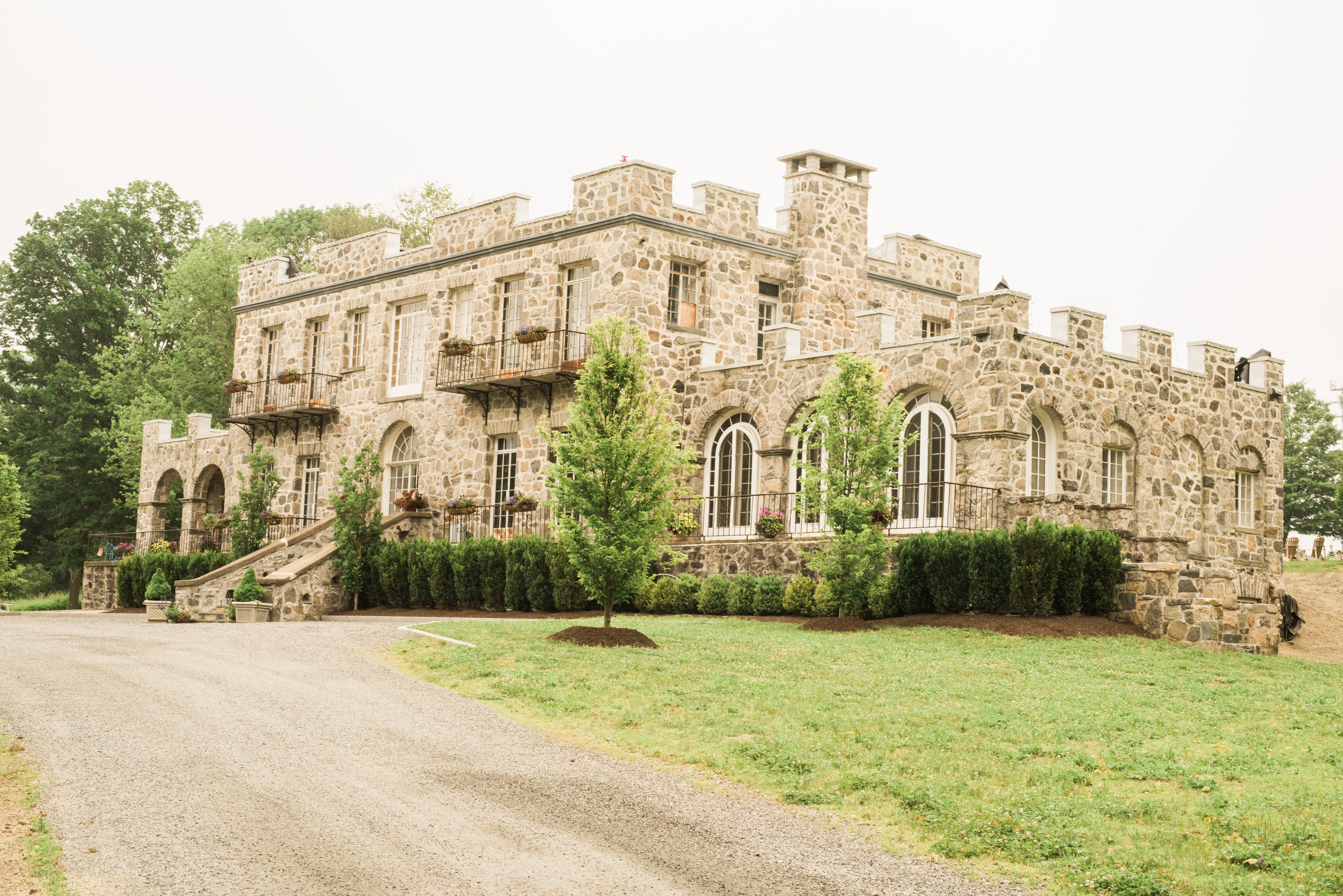
A building formerly owned by the Sisters of the Holy Family of Nazareth in Monroe, Connecticut.

== Ministry ==
In the United States, the sisters have served in schools, and in child care services, care of the elderly, retreat work, and in the parish, prison, and youth ministry.

Sisters continue to be engaged in various areas of healthcare and presently minister as hospital chaplains, nurses, therapists, and lab technicians, attending to the sick, the elderly, and the infirm. As of 2024, there are over 1,000 members in Australia, Belarus, Chile, Croatia, England, France, Ghana, Israel, Italy, Kazakhstan, the Philippines, Poland, Russia, Spain, Ukraine, and the United States.

== Provinces ==
Provinces of the Sisters of the Holy Family of Nazareth
Country	Location	Province name
United States	Des Plaines, Illinois	Holy Family Province
Australia	Garran, Australian Capital Territory	Holy Spirit Province
Poland	Warsaw, Poland	Holy Name of Jesus Province
Poland	Kraków, Poland	Holy Name of Mary Province
Italy; France; Great Britain; Philippines; Spain	Rome, Italy	Generalate Region

== Venerated members ==
Beatified members of the Sisters of the Holy Family include Sister Stella and her companions, who were martyred on 1 August 1943 in Nowogródek, Poland (now Belarus), and who were beatified on 5 March 2000, as well as the foundress, Frances Siedliska, beatified on 23 April 1989. Her feast day is 21 November.

== See also ==
- Holy Family
