= Grotowice, Łódź Voivodeship =

Grotowice
- Village
- Location within Poland
- Coordinates: 51°35′10″N 20°20′50″E
- Country: Poland
- Voivodeship: Łódź
- County: Tomaszów
- Gmina: Rzeczyca

Grotowice [ɡrɔtɔˈvit͡sɛ] is a village in the administrative district of Gmina Rzeczyca, within Tomaszów County, Łódź Voivodeship, in central Poland.
