= Jędrzej Kitowicz =

Polish historian and diarist (1728-1804)

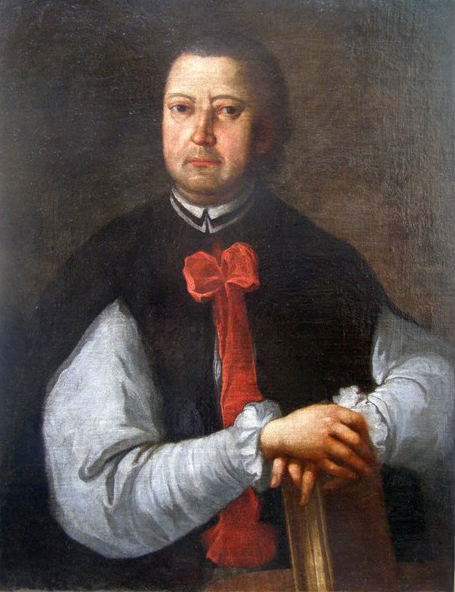
Jędrzej Kitowicz, anonymous painter, c. 1800

Jędrzej Kitowicz (November 25, 1728 – April 3, 1804) was a Polish historian and diarist.

According to Roman Pollak, a historian of Polish literature, Kitowicz was born into a bourgeois family in the region of Greater Poland, and was later employed in the service of wealthy priests. He was a rotmistrz of the Confederation of Bar in Greater Poland. In 1771 he joined a religious seminary, while he remained in service of the bishop of Kujawy Antoni Ostrowski (who later became the primate of Poland). In 1777 he took Holy Orders and in 1781 he became the provost of Rzeczyca where he spent the rest of his life.

He is best known as the author of two unfinished treatises. Description of Customs during the reign of August III (Opis obyczajów za panowania Augusta III, published in 1840) was an attempt to portray the culture of Poland during the first half of the 18th century. Memoires, or History of Poland (Pamiętniki, czyli Historia polska, published partially in 1840, complete edition in 1971) was a chronicle of the years 1743–1798, with special attention to the Confederation of Bar. Kitowicz's works, especially Opis obyczajów... have a significant literary and historical value, although he could not keep himself objective, speaking out against Stanisław August Poniatowski and the reformists. He died in Rzeczyca.
