= Jeziorzec =

- Village
- Location within Poland
- Coordinates: 51°37′50″N 20°23′44″E
- Country: Poland
- Voivodeship: Łódź
- County: Tomaszów
- Gmina: Rzeczyca

Jeziorzec [jɛˈʑɔʐɛt͡s] is a village in the administrative district of Gmina Rzeczyca, within Tomaszów County, Łódź Voivodeship, in central Poland.
