= Brzeziny, Gmina Rzeczyca =

Brzeziny
- Village
- Location within Poland
- Coordinates: 51°36′N 20°21′E
- Country: Poland
- Voivodeship: Łódź
- County: Tomaszów
- Gmina: Rzeczyca

Brzeziny [bʐɛˈʑinɨ] is a village in the administrative district of Gmina Rzeczyca, within Tomaszów County, Łódź Voivodeship, in central Poland.
