= Kawęczyn, Gmina Rzeczyca =

Kawęczyn
- Village
- Location within Poland
- Coordinates: 51°36′54″N 20°20′51″E
- Country: Poland
- Voivodeship: Łódź
- County: Tomaszów
- Gmina: Rzeczyca

Kawęczyn [kaˈvɛnt͡ʂɨn] is a village in the administrative district of Gmina Rzeczyca, within Tomaszów County, Łódź Voivodeship, in central Poland.
