= Wiechnowice =

- Village
- Location within Poland
- Coordinates: 51°38′35″N 20°17′43″E
- Country: Poland
- Voivodeship: Łódź
- County: Tomaszów
- Gmina: Rzeczyca

Wiechnowice [vjɛxnɔˈvit͡sɛ] is a village in the administrative district of Gmina Rzeczyca, within Tomaszów County, Łódź Voivodeship, in central Poland.
