= Stanisławów, Gmina Rzeczyca =

Stanisławów
- Village
- Location within Poland
- Coordinates: 51°38′34″N 20°14′23″E
- Country: Poland
- Voivodeship: Łódź
- County: Tomaszów
- Gmina: Rzeczyca
- Population: 100

Stanisławów [staniˈswavuf] is a village in the administrative district of Gmina Rzeczyca, within Tomaszów County, Łódź Voivodeship, in central Poland.
