= Rzeczyca, Gmina Rzeczyca =

Rzeczyca
- Village
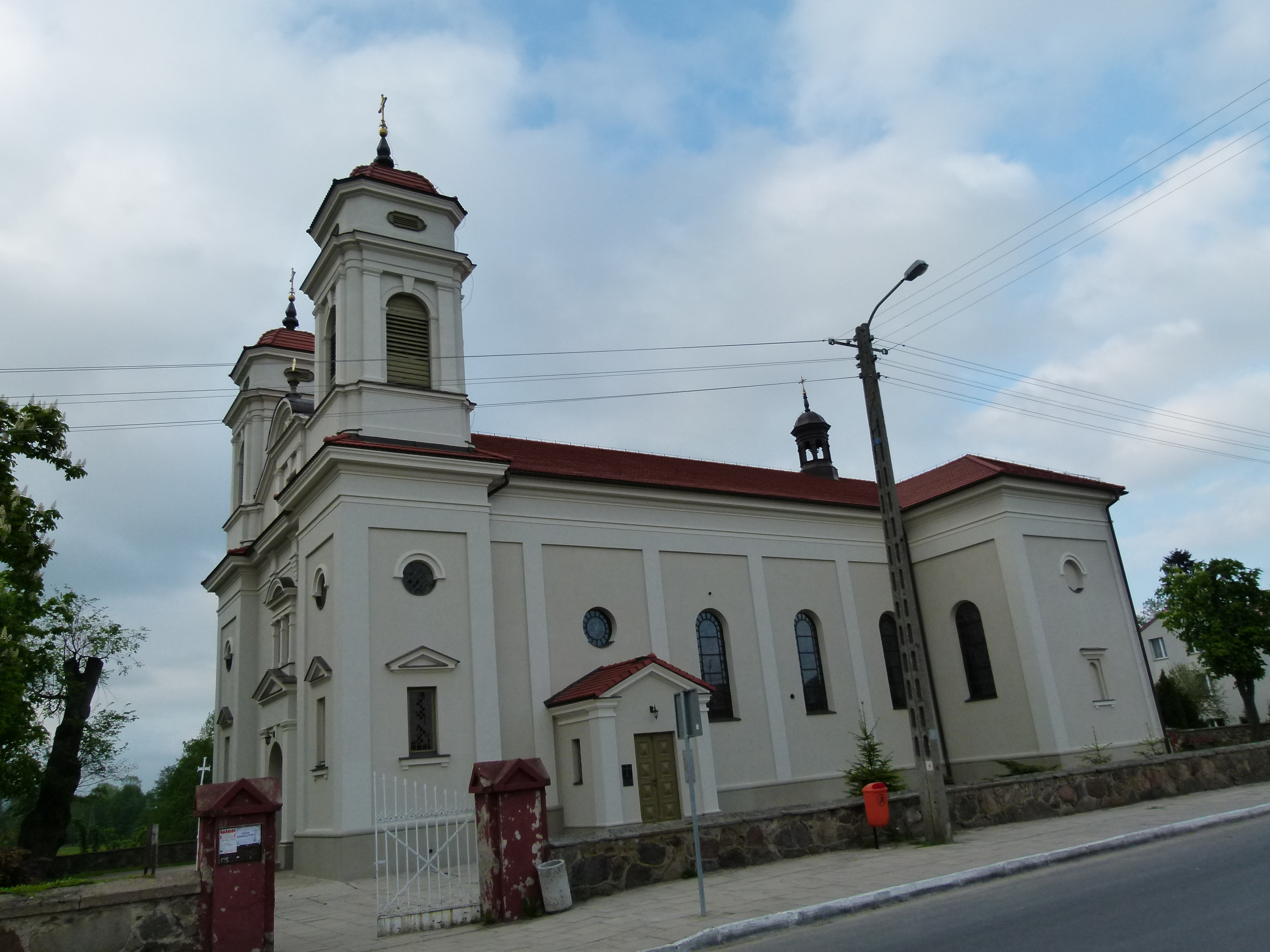
- Church of Saint Catherine

- Location within Poland
- Coordinates: 51°35′47″N 20°17′26″E
- Country: Poland
- Voivodeship: Łódź
- County: Tomaszów
- Gmina: Rzeczyca

Population
  - Total: 1,589
- Time zone: UTC+1 (CET)
  - Summer (DST): UTC+2 (CEST)
- Vehicle registration: ETM
- Website: http://www.rzeczyca.pl/

Rzeczyca [ʐɛˈt͡ʂɨt͡sa] is a village in Tomaszów County, Łódź Voivodeship, in central Poland. It is the seat of the gmina (administrative district) called Gmina Rzeczyca.

Town rights were granted before 1775 and revoked before 1793.
