= Bobrowiec, Łódź Voivodeship =

Bobrowiec
- Village
- Location within Poland
- Coordinates: 51°37′47″N 20°19′49″E
- Country: Poland
- Voivodeship: Łódź
- County: Tomaszów
- Gmina: Rzeczyca

Bobrowiec [bɔˈbrɔvjɛt͡s] is a village in the administrative district of Gmina Rzeczyca, within Tomaszów County, Łódź Voivodeship, in central Poland.
