= Petrovice (Hradec Králové District) =

- Municipality
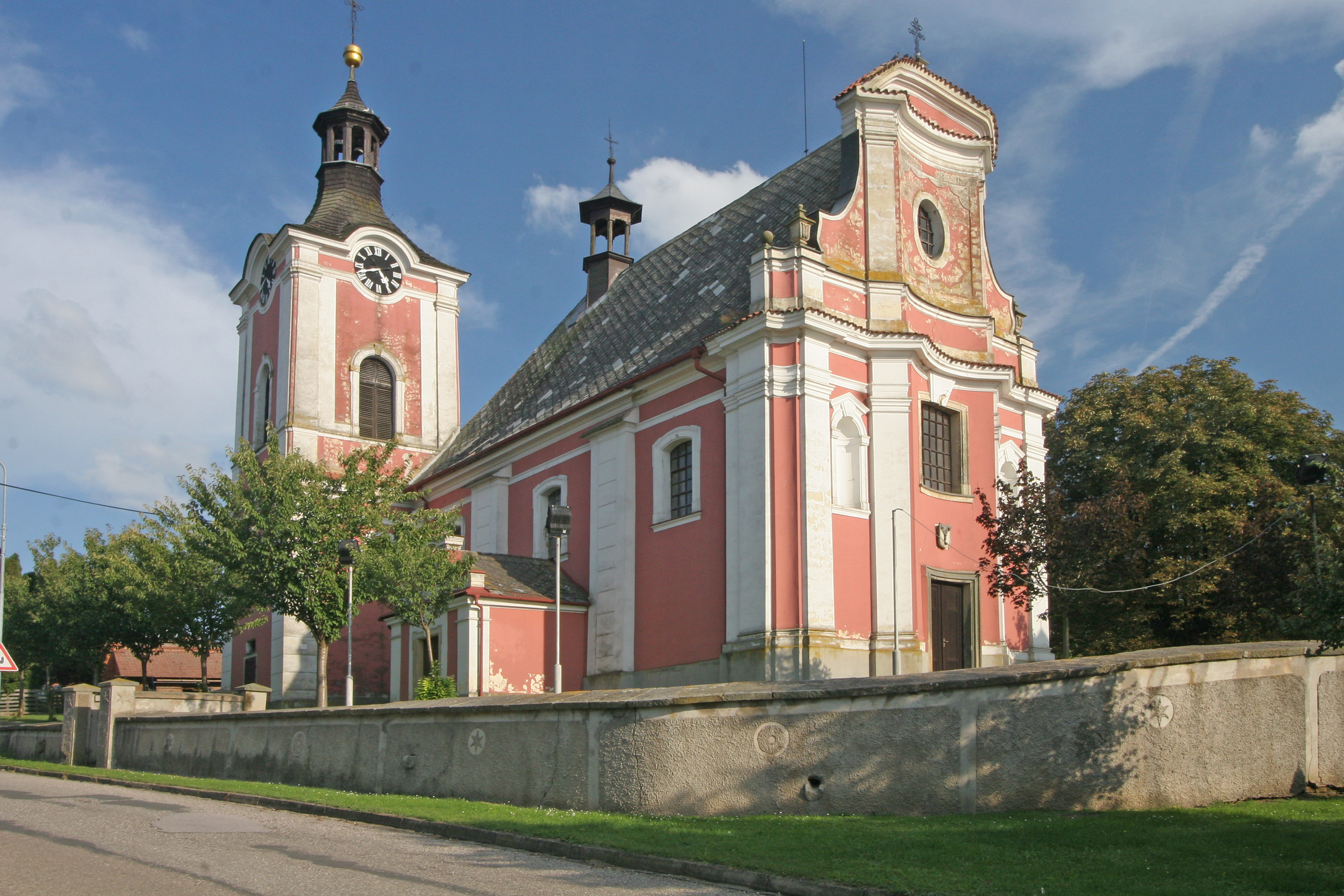
- Church of the Assumption of the Virgin Mary

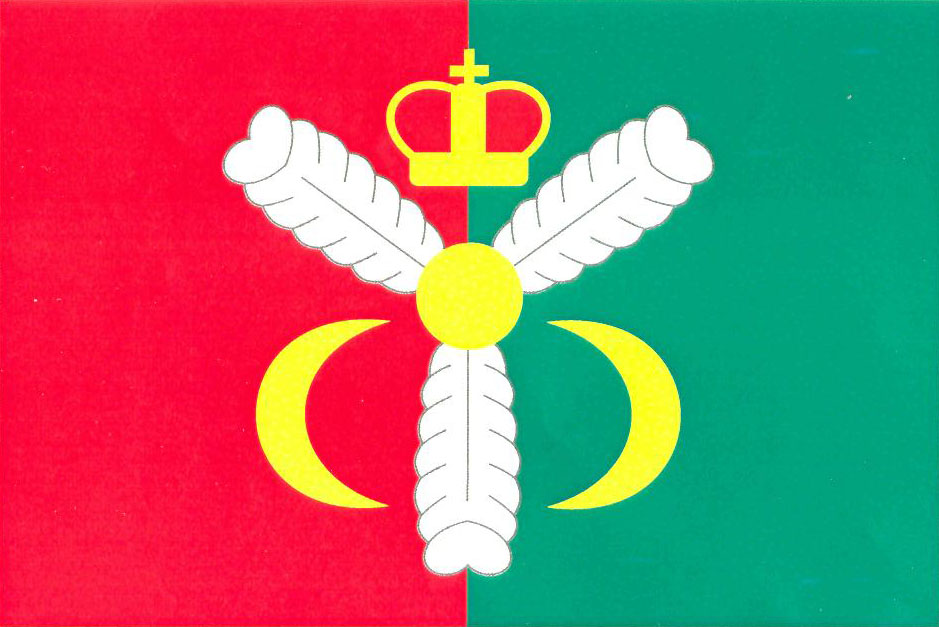
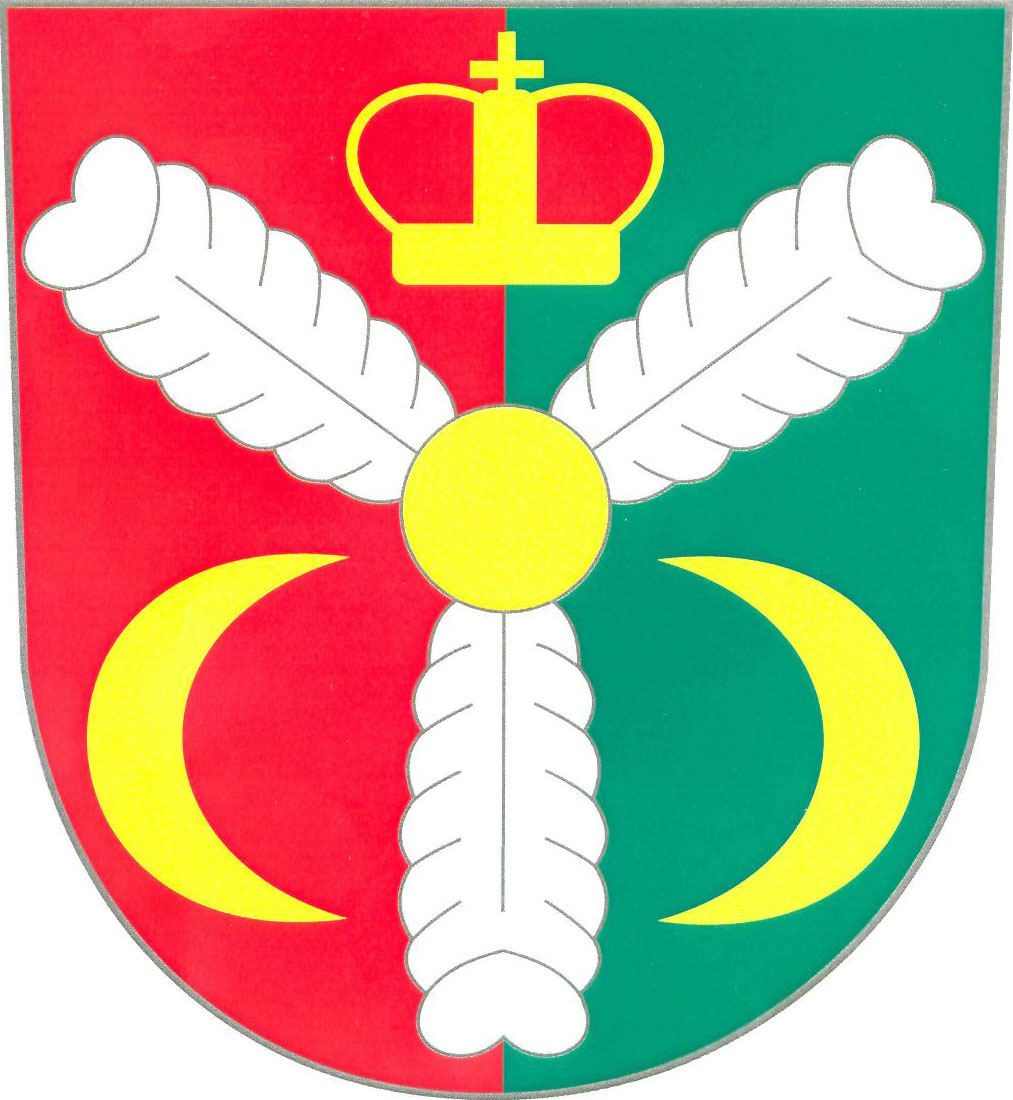
- Flag Coat of arms

- Location in the Czech Republic
- Coordinates: 50°17′23″N 15°35′55″E
- Country: Czech Republic
- Region: Hradec Králové
- District: Hradec Králové
- First mentioned: 1355

Area
  - Total: 9.92 km^{2} (3.83 sq mi)
- Elevation: 248 m (814 ft)

Population (2026-01-01)
  - Total: 283
  - Density: 28.5/km^{2} (73.9/sq mi)
- Time zone: UTC+1 (CET)
  - Summer (DST): UTC+2 (CEST)
- Postal code: 503 55
- Website: www.petrovice.eu

Petrovice is a municipality and village in Hradec Králové District in the Hradec Králové Region of the Czech Republic. It has about 300 inhabitants.

== Administrative division ==
Petrovice consists of two municipal parts (in brackets population according to the 2021 census):

- Petrovice (273)
- Kanice (17)

== Demographics ==
Historical population
Year	Pop.	±%
1869	652	—
1880	682	+4.6%
1890	687	+0.7%
1900	665	−3.2%
1910	635	−4.5%
1921	591	−6.9%
1930	565	−4.4%
1950	401	−29.0%
1961	343	−14.5%
1970	289	−15.7%
1980	279	−3.5%
1991	222	−20.4%
2001	245	+10.4%
2011	247	+0.8%
2021	290	+17.4%
Source: Censuses
