= Gmina Rzeczyca =

Gmina Rzeczyca Rzeczyca Commune
- Gmina
- Flag Coat of arms
- Interactive map of Gmina Rzeczyca
- Coordinates (Rzeczyca): 51°35′47″N 20°17′26″E
- Country: Poland
- Voivodeship: Łódź
- County: Tomaszów
- Seat: Rzeczyca

Area
  - Total: 108.29 km^{2} (41.81 sq mi)

Population (2006)
  - Total: 4,971
  - Density: 45.90/km^{2} (118.9/sq mi)
- Website: http://www.rzeczyca.pl

Gmina Rzeczyca is a rural gmina (administrative district) in Tomaszów County, Łódź Voivodeship, in central Poland. Its seat is the village of Rzeczyca, which lies approximately 21 kilometres (13 mi) north-east of Tomaszów Mazowiecki and 61 km (38 mi) east of the regional capital Łódź.

The gmina covers an area of 108.29 square kilometres (41.8 sq mi), and as of 2006 its total population is 4,971.

The gmina contains part of the protected area called Spała Landscape Park.

== Villages ==
Gmina Rzeczyca contains the villages and settlements of Bartoszówka, Bobrowiec, Brzeg, Brzeziny, Brzozów, Glina, Grotowice, Gustawów, Jeziorzec, Kanice, Kawęczyn, Łęg, Lubocz, Roszkowa Wola, Rzeczyca, Sadykierz, Stanisławów, Wiechnowice and Zawady.

== Neighbouring gminas ==
Gmina Rzeczyca is bordered by the gminas of Cielądz, Czerniewice, Inowłódz, Nowe Miasto nad Pilicą, Odrzywół and Poświętne.
