= Aryaraja =

Aryaraja was a king of Kashmir who features in Rajatarangini (The River of Kings), a legendary and historical chronicle of the north-western Indian subcontinent, particularly the kings of Kashmir. It was written in Sanskrit by Kashmiri historian Kalhana in the 12th century CE.

Although some parts of the Rajatarangini match other sources, Aryaraja appears at the end of the list of kings in Book 2, No kings mentioned in Book 2 have been traced in any other historical source.

He was considered the reincarnation or resurrection of a wise man, Samdhimati, who had been killed by the previous king Jayendra. Witches used magic to bring the skeleton of the wise man back to life, and he then ascended the throne as Aryaraja.

== Influence ==
Comparison of the reincarnation of Samdhimati as Aryaraja have been made with the resurrection accounts in Christianity, with the later being influenced by the former. In Kalhana's account, after a just reign Aryaraja resigned the throne and became a monk.
