= Roszkowa Wola =

- Village
- Location within Poland
- Coordinates: 51°37′N 20°25′E
- Country: Poland
- Voivodeship: Łódź
- County: Tomaszów
- Gmina: Rzeczyca

Roszkowa Wola [rɔʂˈkɔva ˈvɔla] is a village in the administrative district of Gmina Rzeczyca, within Tomaszów County, Łódź Voivodeship, in central Poland.
