= Gustawów, Łódź Voivodeship =

Gustawów
- Village
- Location within Poland
- Coordinates: 51°37′59″N 20°20′58″E
- Country: Poland
- Voivodeship: Łódź
- County: Tomaszów
- Gmina: Rzeczyca

Gustawów [ɡusˈtavuf] is a village in the administrative district of Gmina Rzeczyca, within Tomaszów County, Łódź Voivodeship, in central Poland.
