= Kanice (Domažlice District) =

- Municipality
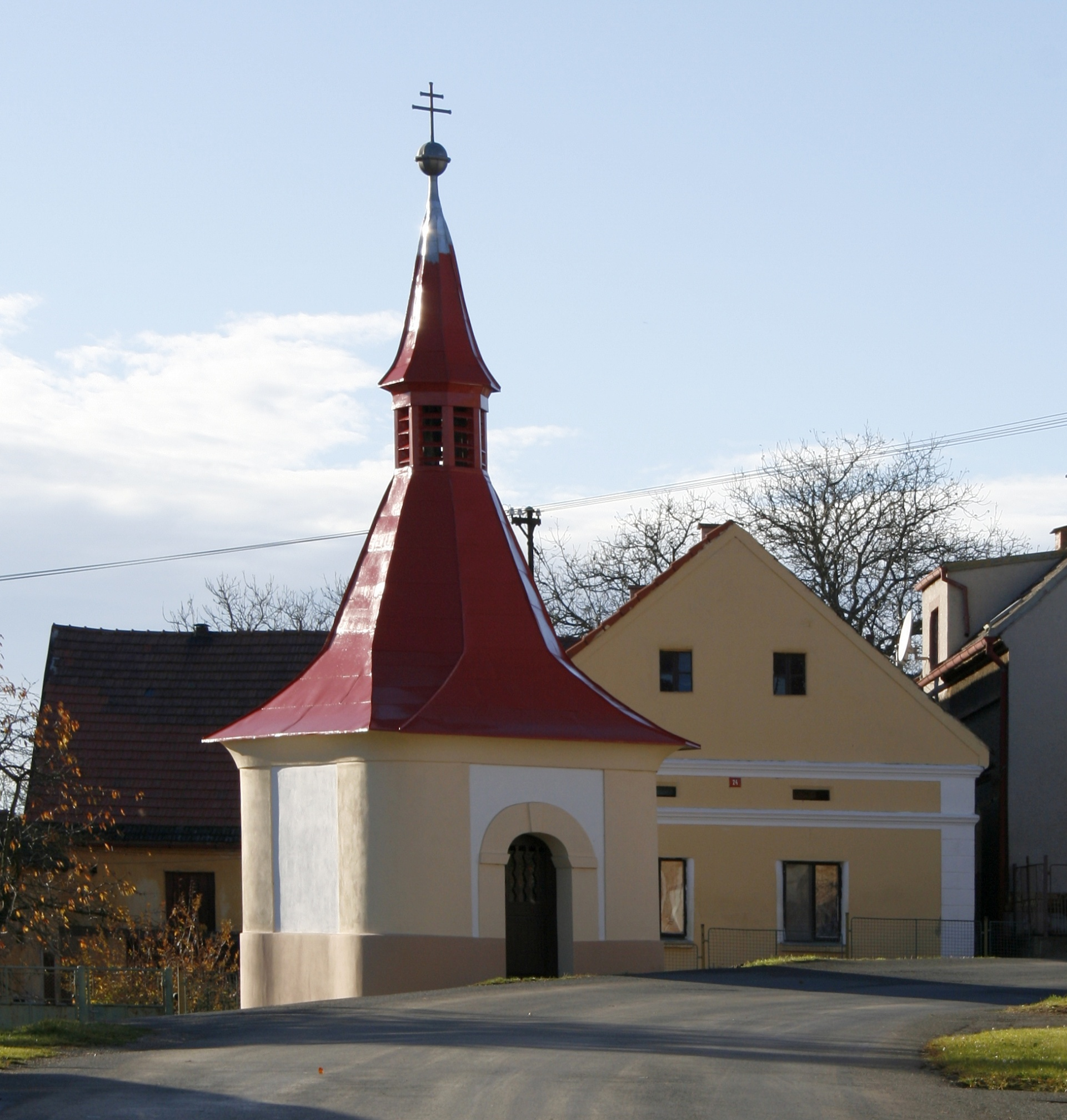
- Chapel of Saint John of Nepomuk

- Location in the Czech Republic
- Coordinates: 49°28′30″N 13°4′22″E
- Country: Czech Republic
- Region: Plzeň
- District: Domažlice
- First mentioned: 1325

Area
  - Total: 7.59 km^{2} (2.93 sq mi)
- Elevation: 432 m (1,417 ft)

Population (2026-01-01)
  - Total: 196
  - Density: 25.8/km^{2} (66.9/sq mi)
- Time zone: UTC+1 (CET)
  - Summer (DST): UTC+2 (CEST)
- Postal code: 345 43
- Website: www.obeckanice.cz

Kanice is a municipality and village in Domažlice District in the Plzeň Region of the Czech Republic. It has about 200 inhabitants.

Kanice lies approximately 12 kilometres (7 mi) east of Domažlice, 38 km (24 mi) south-west of Plzeň, and 119 km (74 mi) south-west of Prague.

== Demographics ==
Historical population
| Year | Pop. | ±% |
|---|---|---|
| 1869 | 517 | — |
| 1880 | 475 | −8.1% |
| 1890 | 489 | +2.9% |
| 1900 | 502 | +2.7% |
| 1910 | 479 | −4.6% |
| 1921 | 463 | −3.3% |
| 1930 | 431 | −6.9% |
| 1950 | 320 | −25.8% |
| 1961 | 256 | −20.0% |
| 1970 | 210 | −18.0% |
| 1980 | 169 | −19.5% |
| 1991 | 200 | +18.3% |
| 2001 | 172 | −14.0% |
| 2011 | 172 | +0.0% |
| 2021 | 194 | +12.8% |
Source: Censuses
