= Bartoszówka, Łódź Voivodeship =

Bartoszówka
- Village
- Location within Poland
- Coordinates: 51°38′12″N 20°19′27″E
- Country: Poland
- Voivodeship: Łódź
- County: Tomaszów
- Gmina: Rzeczyca

Bartoszówka [bartɔˈʂufka] is a village in the administrative district of Gmina Rzeczyca, within Tomaszów County, Łódź Voivodeship, in central Poland.
