= List of flag bearers for Morocco at the Olympics =

Morocco at the Olympics
- IOC code: MAR
- NOC: Moroccan Olympic Committee; Arabic: اللجنة الأولمبية الوطنية المغربية
- Website: www.marocolympique.org (in French)
- Medals: Gold 8 Silver 5 Bronze 13 Total 26

Summer appearances
- 1960; 1964; 1968; 1972; 1976; 1980; 1984; 1988; 1992; 1996; 2000; 2004; 2008; 2012; 2016; 2020; 2024

Winter appearances
- 1968; 1972–1980; 1984; 1988; 1992; 1994–2006; 2010; 2014; 2018; 2022; 2026

This is a list of flag bearers who have represented Morocco at the Olympics.

Flag bearers carry the national flag of their country at the opening ceremony of the Olympic Games.

#	Event year	Season	Flag bearer	Sport
1	1960	Summer		
2	1964	Summer		
3	1968	Winter		
4	1968	Summer		
5	1972	Summer		
6	1976	Summer		
7	1984	Winter		
8	1984	Summer	Lahcen Samsam Akka	Athletics
9	1988	Winter	Mustapha Naitlhou	Alpine skiing (did not compete)
10	1988	Summer	Faouzi Lahbi	Athletics
11	1992	Winter		
12	1992	Summer		
13	1996	Summer	Khalid Skah	Athletics
14	2000	Summer	Adil Belgaïd	Judo
15	2004	Summer	Nezha Bidouane	Athletics
16	2008	Summer	Abdelkader Kada	Coach
17	2010	Winter	Samir Azzimani	Alpine skiing
18	2012	Summer	Wiam Dislam	Taekwondo
19	2014	Winter	Adam Lamhamedi	Alpine skiing
20	2016	Summer	Abdelkebir Ouaddar	Equestrian
21	2018	Winter	Samir Azzimani	Cross-Country Skiing
22	2020	Summer	Oumaïma Belahbib	Boxing
22	2020	Summer	Ramzi Boukhiam	Surfing
23	2022	Winter	Yassine Aouich	Alpine skiing
24	2024	Summer	Ines Laklalech	Golf
24	2024	Summer	Yessin Rahmouni	Equestrian
25	2026	Winter	Pietro Tranchina	Alpine skiing

== See also ==
- Morocco at the Olympics
