= Boxing at the 1976 Summer Olympics – Light heavyweight =

Olympic boxing tournament

Light heavyweight boxing at the Games of the XXI Olympiad
- Venue: Maurice Richard Arena, Montreal
- Dates: 19–31 July 1976
- Competitors: 18 from 18 nations

Medalists
1st place, gold medalist(s)		Leon Spinks	United States
2nd place, silver medalist(s)		Sixto Soria	Cuba
3rd place, bronze medalist(s)		Costica Dafinoiu	Romania
3rd place, bronze medalist(s)		Janusz Gortat	Poland

The men's light heavyweight event was part of the boxing programme at the 1976 Summer Olympics. The weight class allowed boxers of up to 81 kilograms to compete. The competition was held from 19 to 31 July 1976. 18 boxers from 18 nations competed.

== Medalists ==
Gold	Leon Spinks; United States
Silver	Sixto Soria; Cuba
Bronze	Costica Dafinoiu; Romania
Bronze	Janusz Gortat; Poland

== Results ==
The following boxers took part in the event:

Rank	Name	Country
1	Leon Spinks	United States
2	Sixto Soria	Cuba
3T	Costica Dafinoiu	Romania
3T	Janusz Gortat	Poland
5T	Wolfgang Gruber	West Germany
5T	Juan Domingo Suárez	Argentina
5T	Robert Burgess	Bermuda
5T	Ottomar Sachse	East Germany
9T	José Rosa	Puerto Rico
9T	Vilmos Jakab	Hungary
9T	Anatoliy Klimanov	Soviet Union
9T	Georgi Stoimenov	Bulgaria
9T	Joan Claudi Montane	Andorra
14T	Hocine Tafer	France
14T	Miloslav Popović	Yugoslavia
14T	Abdel Latif Fatihi	Morocco
14T	Ernesto Sánchez	Venezuela
14T	Roger Fortin	Canada

=== First round ===
- Vilmos Jakab (HUN) def. Mohamed Mama (GHA), walk-over
- Juan Domingo Suarez (ARG) def. Hocine Tafer (FRA), KO-1
- Janusz Gortat (POL) def. Miloslav Popović (YUG), 3:2
- Georgi Stoymenov (BUL) def. Ernesto Sanchez (VEN), 5:0
- Leon Spinks (USA) def. Abdel Latif Fatihi (MAR), KO-1
- Anatoliy Klimanov (URS) def. Roger Fortin (CAN), 5:0
- Joan Montane (AND) def. Gabriel Daramola (NGA), walk-over
- Ottomar Sachse (GDR) def. Louis Ngatchou (CMR), walk-over

=== Second round ===
- Sixto Soria (CUB) def. José Rosa (PUR), KO-2
- Wolfgang Gruber (FRG) def. Frederick Sabat (KEN), walk-over
- Costică Dafinoiu (ROM) def. Robert Nixon (GUY), walk-over
- Robert Burgess (BER) def. Seifu Mekonnen (ETH), walk-over
- Juan Domingo Suarez (ARG) def. Vilmos Jakab (HUN), KO-1
- Janusz Gortat (POL) def. Georgi Stoymenov (BUL), AB-3
- Leon Spinks (USA) def. Anatoliy Klimanov (URS), 5:0
- Ottomar Sachse (GDR) def. Joan Montane (AND), RSC-3

=== Quarterfinals ===
- Sixto Soria (CUB) def. Wolfgang Gruber (FRG), KO-2
- Costică Dafinoiu (ROM) def. Robert Burgess (BER), 5:0
- Janusz Gortat (POL) def. Juan Domingo Suarez (ARG), 4:1
- Leon Spinks (USA) def. Ottomar Sachse (GDR), 5:0

=== Semifinals ===
- Sixto Soria (CUB) def. Costică Dafinoiu (ROM), AB-1
- Leon Spinks (USA) def. Janusz Gortat (POL), 5:0

=== Final ===
- Leon Spinks (USA) def. Sixto Soria (CUB), RSC-3
