= Morocco at the 1988 Winter Olympics =

- IOC code: MAR
- NOC: Moroccan Olympic Committee; Arabic: اللجنة الأولمبية الوطنية المغربية
- Website: www.cnom.org.ma (in French)

in Calgary, Canada
- Competitors: 3 (men) in 1 sport
- Flag bearers: Mustapha Naitlhou, (treasurer, Moroccan Ski Association)
- Medals: Gold 0 Silver 0 Bronze 0 Total 0

Winter Olympics appearances (overview)
- 1968; 1972–1980; 1984; 1988; 1992; 1994–2006; 2010; 2014; 2018; 2022; 2026

Morocco competed at the 1988 Winter Olympics in Calgary, Alberta, Canada.

Calgary 1988 marked the first time the Moroccan Olympic team competed in Canada as Morocco and other nations boycotted the 1976 Summer Olympics in Montreal due to the IOC's refusal to ban New Zealand but the nation competed form 18-20 July before joining the other nations to boycott.

== Competitors ==
The following is the list of number of competitors in the Games.

Sport	Men	Women	Total
Alpine skiing	3	0	3
Total	3	0	3

== Alpine skiing ==
Men

Athlete	Event	Race 1	Race 2	Total	
Athlete	Event	Time	Time	Time	Rank
Ahmed Ait Moulay	Giant Slalom	DSQ	–	DSQ	–
Lotfi Housnialaoui	Giant Slalom	DSQ	–	DSQ	–
Ahmad Ouachit	Giant Slalom	DSQ	–	DSQ	–
Lotfi Housnialaoui	Slalom	1:35.61	1:14.03	2:49.64	47
Ahmed Ait Moulay	Slalom	1:20.36	1:12.81	2:33.17	42
Ahmad Ouachit	Slalom	1:19.17	1:12.36	2:31.53	41
