= Morocco at the 1984 Winter Olympics =

- IOC code: MAR
- NOC: Moroccan Olympic Committee; Arabic: اللجنة الأولمبية الوطنية المغربية
- Website: www.cnom.org.ma (in French)

in Sarajevo
- Competitors: 4 (man) in 1 sport
- Medals: Gold 0 Silver 0 Bronze 0 Total 0

Winter Olympics appearances (overview)
- 1968; 1972–1980; 1984; 1988; 1992; 1994–2006; 2010; 2014; 2018; 2022; 2026

Morocco competed at the 1984 Winter Olympics in Sarajevo, Yugoslavia.

== Alpine skiing ==
Men

Athlete	Event	Race 1		Race 2		Total	
Athlete	Event	Time	Rank	Time	Rank	Time	Rank
Hamid Oujebbad	Giant Slalom	1:58.13	80	2:08.56	74	4:06.69	74
Brahim Ait Sibrahim	Giant Slalom	1:56.32	77	DNF	–	DNF	–
Ahmed Ait Moulay	Giant Slalom	1:54.54	75	2:03.41	71	3:57.95	73
Ahmad Ouachit	Giant Slalom	1:45.17	65	1:56.94	65	3:42.11	64
Ahmed Ait Moulay	Slalom	1:24.80	64	1:18.45	43		
Brahim Ait Sibrahim	Slalom	1:18.90	60	DNF	–	DNF	–
Ahmad Ouachit	Slalom	1:13.14	54	1:10.34	37	2:23.38	38
