= Sixto Soria =

Cuban boxer (born 1954)

Medal record

Men's Boxing

Representing Cuba

Olympic Games
Silver medal – second place	1976 Montreal	Light Heavyweight

World Amateur Championships
Gold medal – first place	1978 Belgrade	Light Heavyweight

Sixto Soria Savigne (born April 27, 1954 in Santiago de Cuba) is a Cuban boxer, who won the silver medal in the men's Light Heavyweight (81 kg) category at the 1976 Summer Olympics in Montreal. As the favorite he lost in an exciting fight to Leon Spinks of USA. Two years later he captured the world title at the second World Championships in Belgrade. He lost in the quarter-finals of the 1979 Pan American Games to American Tony Tucker.

== 1976 Olympic results ==
- Round of 32:
- Round of 16: Defeated José Rosa (Puerto Rico) second-round knockout
- Quarterfinal: Defeated Wolfgang Gruber (West Germany) second-round knockout
- Semifinal: Defeated Costică Dafinoiu (Romania) referee stopped contest in first round
- Final: Lost to Leon Spinks (USA) referee stopped contest in third round (was awarded silver medal)
