= Leon Spinks =

American boxer (1953–2021)

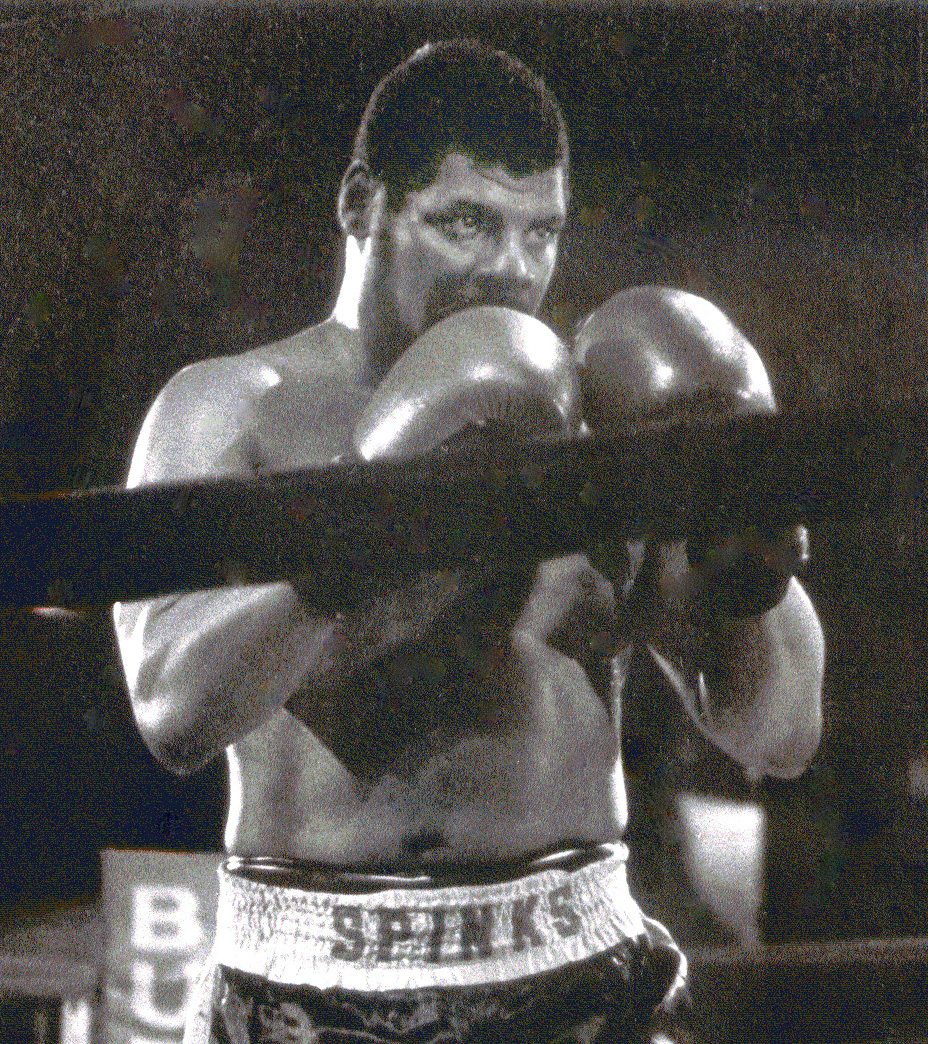
- Spinks vs. Ray Kipping, 1995

Personal information
- Nickname: Neon
- Born: July 11, 1953 St. Louis, Missouri, U.S.
- Died: February 5, 2021 (aged 67) Henderson, Nevada, U.S.
- Height: 6 ft 1 in (185 cm)
- Weight: Cruiserweight; Heavyweight

Boxing career
- Reach: 76 in (193 cm)
- Stance: Orthodox

Boxing record
- Total fights: 46
- Wins: 26
- Win by KO: 14
- Losses: 17
- Draws: 3
Medal record
Men's amateur boxing
Representing United States
Olympic Games
Gold medal – first place	1976 Montreal	Light heavyweight
Pan American Games
Silver medal – second place	1975 Mexico City	Light heavyweight
World Championships
Bronze medal – third place	1974 Havana	Light heavyweight

Leon Spinks (July 11, 1953 – February 5, 2021) was an American professional boxer who competed from 1977 to 1995. In only his eighth professional fight, he won the undisputed heavyweight championship in 1978 after defeating Muhammad Ali in a split decision, in what is considered one of the biggest upsets in heavyweight boxing history. Spinks was later stripped of the WBC title for facing Ali in an unapproved rematch seven months later, which he lost by a unanimous decision.

Besides being heavyweight champion and his characteristic gap-toothed grin (due to losing two and later all four of his front teeth), Spinks gained notoriety for the disaster which befell his career following his loss to Ali. However, he did challenge once more for the WBC heavyweight title in 1981 (losing to Larry Holmes by TKO in the third round), and the WBA cruiserweight title in 1986 (losing to Dwight Muhammad Qawi by TKO in the sixth round).

As an amateur, Spinks won numerous medals in the light heavyweight division. The first was bronze at the inaugural 1974 World Championships, followed by silver at the 1975 Pan American Games, and gold at the 1976 Summer Olympics—‌the latter alongside his brother Michael Spinks, who won middleweight gold. Leon served in the United States Marine Corps from 1973 to 1976, rising to the rank of corporal. He was stationed at Marine Corps Base Camp Lejeune in North Carolina and was on the Marine Corps Boxing Team.

Spinks also had a brief career as a professional wrestler from 1986, 1990 to 1993. He mainly worked for Frontier Martial-Arts Wrestling (FMW) and holding the FMW Brass Knuckles Heavyweight Championship in 1992.

== Amateur career ==
Spinks won three consecutive national AAU light heavyweight championships from 1974 to 1976, the first of which came against future champion Michael Dokes. He was serving in the Marine Corps at the time. Spinks won a silver medal at the 1975 Pan American Games in Mexico City, Mexico. He also won a bronze medal at the 1974 World Amateur Boxing Championships in Havana, Cuba. During Spinks time in the Marine Corps he won three consecutive All-Marine Light Heavyweight titles.

=== Olympic results ===
Spinks won the light heavyweight gold medal at the 1976 Summer Olympics in Montreal. He defeated Abdel Latif Fatihi from Morocco, Soviet-Ukrainian Anatoliy Klimanov, East-German Ottomar Sachse, and Janusz Gortat from Poland en route to the final, where he defeated Cuba's Sixto Soria to win the gold.

- Round 1: defeated Abdel Latif Fatihi (Morocco) by first-round knockout
- Round 2: defeated Anatoliy Klimanov (Soviet Union) on points, 5–0
- Quarterfinals: defeated Ottomar Sachse (East Germany) on points, 5–0
- Semifinals: defeated Janusz Gortat (Poland) on points, 5–0
- Final: defeated Sixto Soria (Cuba) referee stopped contest, third round

Spinks finished his amateur career with a record of 178–7 with 133 knockouts.

== Professional career ==
Spinks debuted professionally on January 15, 1977, in Las Vegas, Nevada, beating Bob Smith by knockout in five rounds. His next fight was in Liverpool, England, where he beat Peter Freeman by a first-round knockout. Later, he saw an improvement in opposition quality, when he fought Pedro Agosto of Puerto Rico and knocked him out in round one. He then fought Scott LeDoux to a draw and defeated Italian champion Alfio Righetti in a decision.

=== Spinks vs. Ali ===
At the time a lower-ranked contender, Spinks made history when he decisively beat Muhammad Ali in a 15-round split decision in Las Vegas, Nevada on February 15, 1978. As this was his eighth professional fight, he became the fastest to ascent to the heavyweight title in boxing history. The aging Ali had expected an easy fight, but was out-boxed by Spinks, who did not tire throughout the bout and had Ali ready to fall in the last seconds of the fight. It was one of the few bouts when Ali left the ring with a bruised and puffy face.

The victory over Ali was the peak of Spinks's career. He was the only man ever to take the heavyweight title from Ali in the ring, as Ali's other losses were in non-title fights or bouts where Ali was the challenger. Spinks's gap-toothed grin was featured on the cover of the February 19, 1978 issue of Sports Illustrated.

However, Spinks was stripped of his world title by the WBC for refusing to defend it against Ken Norton, instead agreeing to a return bout against Ali to defend his WBA crown. The title, stripped from Spinks, was then awarded to Norton.

=== Rematch ===
His second match with Ali, at the Louisiana Superdome on September 15, 1978, went badly for Spinks. A now-in-shape Ali—with better, sharper tactics—rarely lost control, winning back his title by a unanimous fifteen-round decision. Ali regained the title, becoming the first three-time lineal heavyweight champion. Spinks was never given a rematch; Ali retired after the fight (although he came out of retirement a few years later to fight Larry Holmes and Trevor Berbick).

=== Career development ===
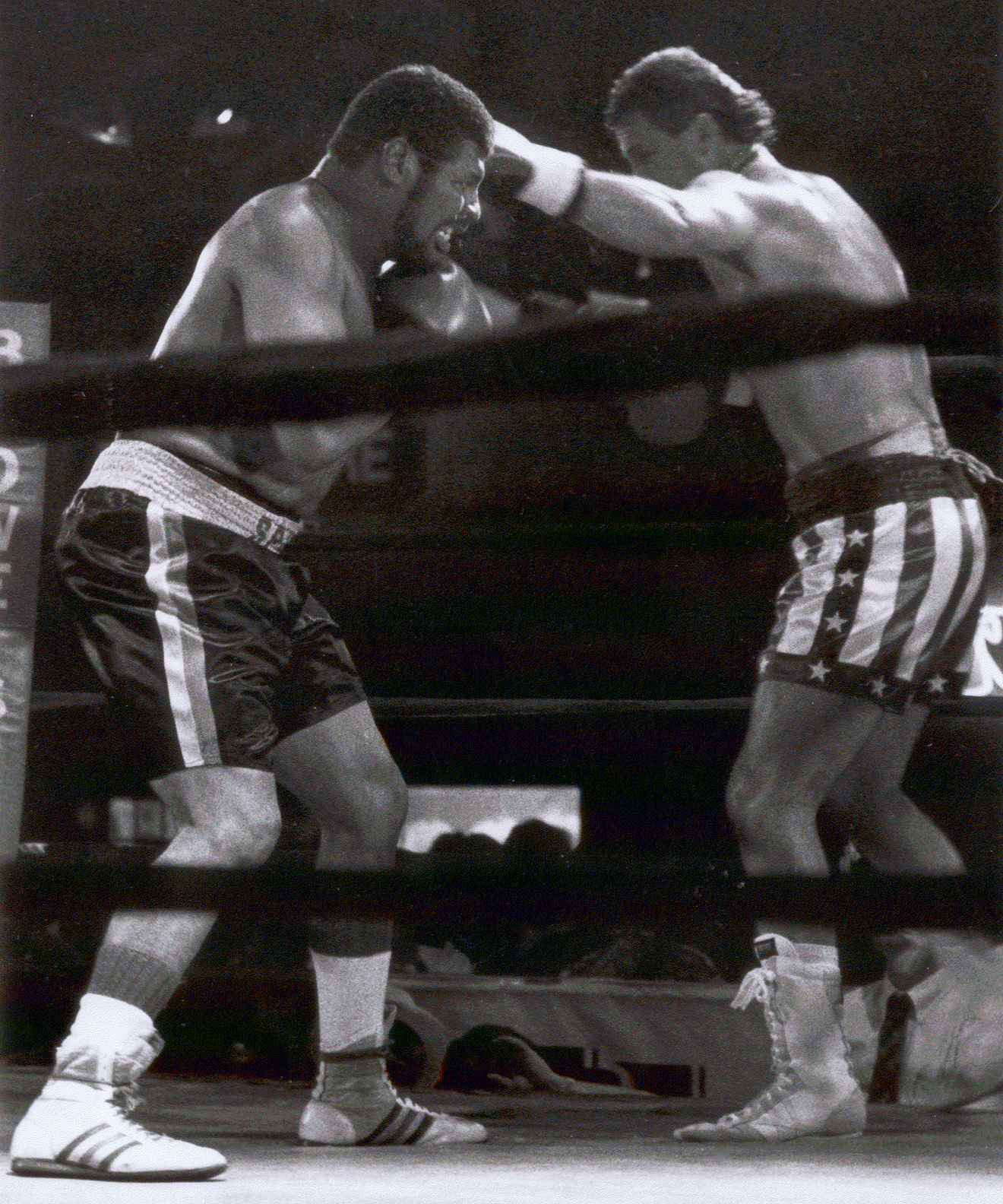
Spinks defeated Ray Kipping on June 19, 1995, in St. Louis

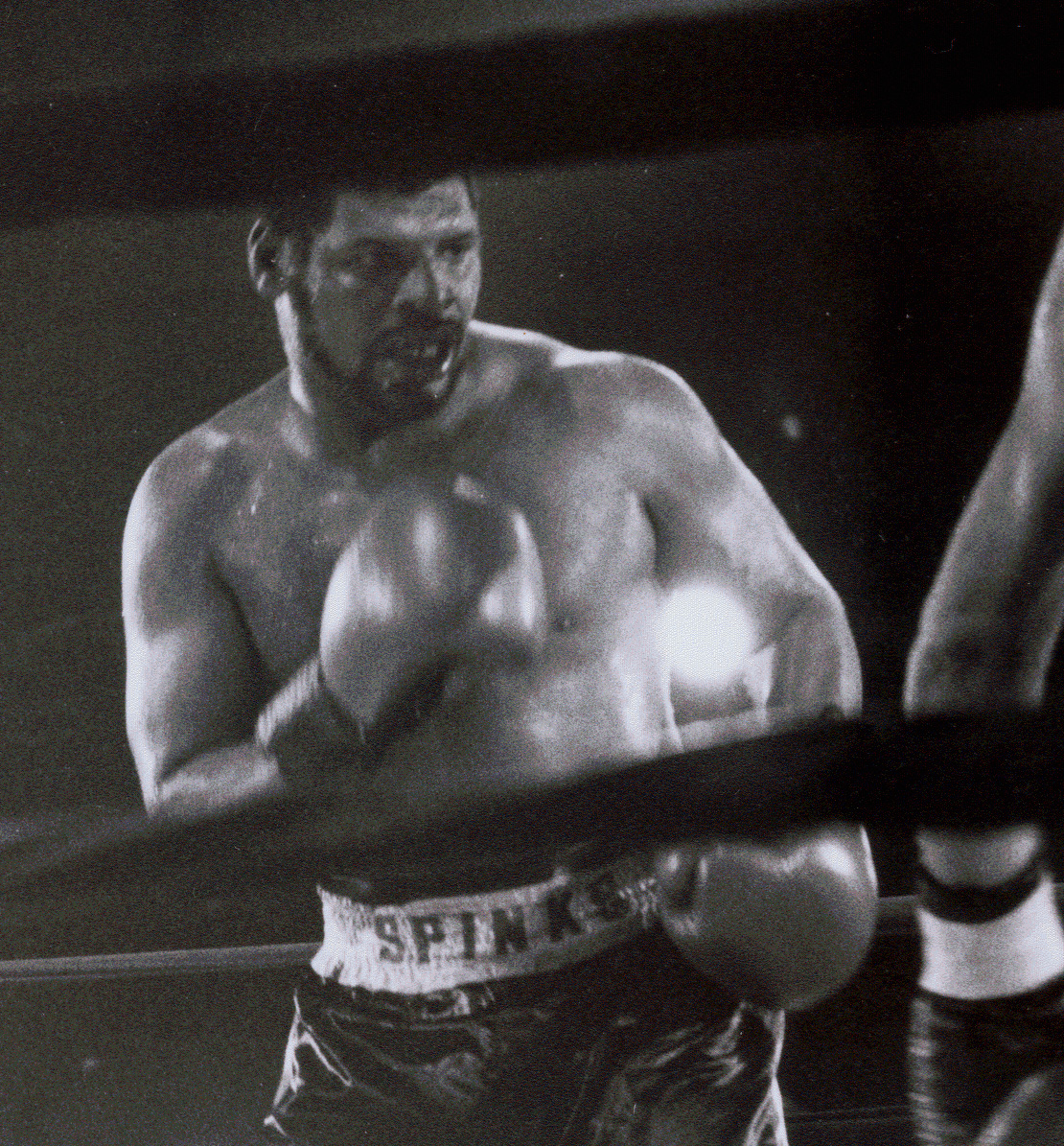
Spinks during his final victory held at the "Little Bit of Texas" in St. Louis

Spinks's next fight, his only one in 1979, was at Monte Carlo, where he was knocked out in the first round by future WBA world heavyweight champion Gerrie Coetzee. In the following fight, Spinks defeated former world title challenger and European title holder Alfredo Evangelista by a knockout in round 5. He then fought to a draw in with Eddie López, scored a knockout over Kevin Isaac in May, and, in October, beat the WBC's top-ranked challenger, Bernardo Mercado, by a knockout in round nine on the undercard of Larry Holmes vs. Muhammad Ali.

His strong performance against Mercado earned Spinks a title match against Larry Holmes. In Spinks's only fight in 1981, on June 12 and what would be his last opportunity to win the heavyweight title, he took multiple punches without responding in the third round and the referee stopped the fight.

=== Move to cruiserweight ===
The bout against Holmes was Spinks's last heavyweight bout for years, as he began boxing in the cruiserweight division. He beat contender Ivy Brown by a decision in ten rounds, and gained a decision against former and future title challenger Jesse Burnett in twelve rounds.

Spinks was due to face the World Cruiserweight number one David Pearce, but the fight was called off on 24 hours notice after the fighters had both weighed in, due to the BBBoC stance on Pearce fighting abroad in the newly formed Cruiserweight division.

When his brother Michael Spinks defeated Larry Holmes in a controversial upset for the IBF heavyweight championship in 1985, they became the only brothers to have held world heavyweight championships. They kept the distinction until the Klitschko brothers became champions two decades later.

In the 1980s Leon Spinks competed in several boxer vs. wrestler matches in New Japan Pro-Wrestling (NJPW), including losing by submission to Antonio Inoki. In 1986 Spinks earned his last championship opportunity, fighting Dwight Muhammad Qawi for the WBA cruiserweight championship. Qawi had been defeated by Michael Spinks three years earlier for his WBC light heavyweight championship. However, Leon lost by TKO in the sixth round.

Spinks boxed for another eight years with mixed results. In 1994 he lost a bout by KO in the first round to John Carlo in Washington D.C., the first time a former heavyweight champion had lost in the first to a boxer making his pro debut (promoter Charles Farrell later admitted to falsifying Carlo's record in order to get the fight sanctioned by the District of Columbia). Spinks retired at age 42, after losing an 8-round decision to Fred Houpe in 1995, who was coming off a seventeen-year hiatus.

== Professional wrestling career ==
On October 9, 1986, Spinks lost to Japanese legend Antonio Inoki in a mixed martial arts fight for New Japan Pro Wrestling. Spinks made an appearance for the United States Wrestling Association on June 25, 1990, where he lost to Jerry Lawler by disqualification.

In 1991, Spinks made his debut in Japan for Frontier Martial-Arts Wrestling (FMW) teaming with fellow boxer Rufus Blackborn. He later teamed with Dr. Luther in 1992. On March 25, 1992, he defeated Tarzan Goto for the FMW Brass Knuckles Heavyweight Championship. He would drop the title to Atsushi Onita on May 24, 1992. In 1993, he feuded with Terry Funk and retired from wrestling later that year.

== Life after boxing ==
During the 1990s, Spinks worked for Frontier Martial-Arts Wrestling, winning its world title in 1992, making him only the second man (after Primo Carnera) to hold titles in both boxing and wrestling. In the late 1990s, Spinks was a headliner on year-round, touring autograph shows. In 2005 Spinks was living in Columbus, Nebraska, working as a janitor at a YMCA and at a McDonald's.

In 2009, Spinks was featured as part of the 2009 documentary Facing Ali, in which notable former opponents of Ali speak about how fighting Ali changed their lives.

Spinks lived in Las Vegas, Nevada in his later life. He told a reporter his life was "comfortable", and that he kept a low profile.

In August 2017, Leon and his brother, Michael were both inducted into the Nevada Boxing Hall of Fame.

== Personal life and health ==
Spinks was born and raised in St. Louis.

Leon's son, Cory Spinks, held the undisputed welterweight title, and was the IBF junior middleweight champion twice.

In 1990, Leon's other son, Leon Calvin, was shot to death in East St. Louis as he was driving home from his girlfriend's house. Calvin was an aspiring light heavyweight pro boxer with a record of 2–0, with the two pro bouts occurring only a month before he died. Leon's grandson and Calvin's son, Leon Spinks III, is an aspiring light heavyweight southpaw boxer with a pro record of 11–3–1 with seven knockouts, his last outing being a six-round draw with Robbie Cannon in October 2017.

Spinks perceptibly slurred his words after his active boxing days, and was diagnosed in 2012 with shrinkage in his brain, which doctors said was likely caused by the accumulated punches that he took during his career. In 2011, Spinks and his wife Brenda moved to Las Vegas. Spinks was hospitalized twice in 2014 in a Las Vegas hospital for surgery due to abdominal problems, from which he recovered.

In 2019, it was revealed that Spinks was diagnosed with advanced prostate cancer. He died at a hospital in Henderson, Nevada on February 5, 2021, at age 67.

== Professional boxing record ==
46 fights	26 wins	17 losses
By knockout	14	9
By decision	11	8
By disqualification	1	0
Draws	3	

No.	Result	Record	Opponent	Type	Round, time	Date	Location	Notes
46	Loss	26–17–3	Fred Houpe	UD	8	Dec 4, 1995	A Little Bit of Texas, St. Louis, Missouri, U.S.	
45	Win	26–16–3	Ray Kipping	UD	8	Jun 19, 1995	A Little Bit of Texas, St. Louis, Missouri, U.S.	
44	Loss	25–16–3	John Carlo	KO	1 (10), 1:09	Oct 22, 1994	Convention Center, Washington, D.C., U.S.	
43	Loss	25–15–3	Shane Sutcliffe	UD	8	Oct 1, 1994	Civic Arena, Nanaimo, British Columbia, Canada	
42	Win	25–14–3	Eddie Curry	DQ	9 (10)	Jun 22, 1994	Raleigh, North Carolina, U.S.	Curry disqualified after refusing to answer the bell for round 9, believing the fight was scheduled for 8 rounds
41	Loss	24–14–3	James Wilder	PTS	10	Feb 27, 1993	Davenport, Iowa, U.S.	
40	Win	24–13–3	Kevin Poindexter	KO	1 (10), 2:37	Dec 11, 1992	Union Hall, Countryside, Illinois, U.S.	
39	Loss	23–13–3	Kevin Porter	PTS	10	Sep 26, 1992	Lansing, Michigan, U.S.	
38	Win	23–12–3	Jack Jackson	KO	3 (10), 2:52	Jul 24, 1992	Union Hall, Countryside, Illinois, U.S.	
37	Win	22–12–3	Rocky Bentley	PTS	10	Jun 17, 1992	World Congress Center, Atlanta, Georgia, U.S.	
36	Win	21–12–3	Rick Myers	UD	10	Mar 20, 1992	Clarion Hotel Ballroom, St. Louis, Missouri, U.S.	
35	Win	20–12–3	Andre Crowder	SD	10	Feb 28, 1992	Union Hall, Countryside, Illinois, U.S.	
34	Win	19–12–3	Lupe Guerra	KO	3 (10), 2:13	Nov 15, 1991	Genesis Convention Center, Gary, Indiana, U.S.	
33	Loss	18–12–3	Tony Morrison	TKO	1 (10), 0:33	May 30, 1988	Marriott Hotel, Trumbull, Connecticut, U.S.	
32	Loss	18–11–3	Randall Cobb	MD	10	Mar 18, 1988	Municipal Auditorium, Nashville, Tennessee, U.S.	
31	Loss	18–10–3	Ladislao Mijangos	SD	10	Dec 20, 1987	Convention Center Arena, San Antonio, Texas, U.S.	
30	Loss	18–9–3	Terry Mims	SD	10	Oct 20, 1987	Swingos, Cleveland, Ohio, U.S.	
29	Draw	18–8–3	Jim Ashard	SD	10	Aug 29, 1987	Lane County Fair grounds, Eugene, Oregon, U.S.	
28	Loss	18–8–2	Angelo Musone	KO	7 (10)	May 22, 1987	Iesi, Italy	
27	Win	18–7–2	Jeff Jordan	SD	12	Apr 28, 1987	Aichi Prefectural Gymnasium, Nagoya, Japan	Won vacant WBC Continental Americas heavyweight title
26	Loss	17–7–2	José Ribalta	TKO	1 (10), 2:10	Jan 17, 1987	Coconut Grove Convention Center, Miami, Florida, U.S.	
25	Loss	17–6–2	Rocky Sekorski	TKO	6 (10), 1:43	Aug 2, 1986	Port Authority, Detroit Lakes, Minnesota, U.S.	
24	Loss	17–5–2	Dwight Muhammad Qawi	TKO	6 (15), 2:56	Mar 22, 1986	Lawlor Events Center, Reno, Nevada, U.S.	For WBA cruiserweight title
23	Win	17–4–2	Kip Kane	TKO	8 (12), 1:37	Dec 13, 1985	Felt Forum, New York City, New York, U.S.	Won vacant WBC Continental Americas heavyweight title
22	Win	16–4–2	Tom Franco Thomas	UD	10	Jun 29, 1985	Sonoma County Fairgrounds, Santa Rosa, California, U.S.	
21	Win	15–4–2	Tom Fischer	UD	10	May 9, 1985	Cobo Arena, Detroit, Michigan, U.S.	
20	Win	14–4–2	Rick Kellar	TKO	2 (10), 2:47	Apr 9, 1985	Blaisdell Center Arena, Honolulu, Hawaii, U.S.	
19	Win	13–4–2	Lupe Guerra	TKO	4 (10), 0:43	Feb 21, 1985	Cobo Arena, Detroit, Michigan, U.S.	
18	Loss	12–4–2	Carlos de León	RTD	6 (10), 3:00	Mar 6, 1983	Broadway by the Bay Theater, Atlantic City, New Jersey, U.S.	
17	Win	12–3–2	Jesse Burnett	UD	12	Oct 31, 1982	Great Gorge Resort, McAfee, New Jersey, U.S.	Won vacant NABF cruiserweight title
16	Win	11–3–2	Ivy Brown	UD	10	Feb 24, 1982	Playboy Hotel and Casino, Atlantic City, New Jersey, U.S.	
15	Loss	10–3–2	Larry Holmes	TKO	3 (15), 2:34	Jun 12, 1981	Joe Louis Arena, Detroit, Michigan, U.S.	For WBC and The Ring heavyweight titles
14	Win	10–2–2	Bernardo Mercado	TKO	9 (12), 2:52	Oct 2, 1980	Caesars Palace, Paradise, Nevada, U.S.	
13	Win	9–2–2	Kevin Isaac	TKO	8 (10), 2:11	May 3, 1980	Circle Star Theater, San Carlos, California, U.S.	
12	Draw	8–2–2	Eddie López	SD	10	Mar 8, 1980	The Aladdin, Paradise, Nevada, U.S.	
11	Win	8–2–1	Alfredo Evangelista	KO	5 (10), 2:43	Jan 12, 1980	Resorts International Casino, Atlantic City, New Jersey, U.S.	
10	Loss	7–2–1	Gerrie Coetzee	TKO	1 (12), 2:03	Jun 24, 1979	Le Chapiteau de l'Espace, Fontvieille, Monaco	
9	Loss	7–1–1	Muhammad Ali	UD	15	Sep 15, 1978	Superdome, New Orleans, Louisiana, U.S.	Lost WBA and The Ring heavyweight titles
8	Win	7–0–1	Muhammad Ali	SD	15	Feb 15, 1978	Las Vegas Hilton, Winchester, Nevada, U.S.	Won WBA, WBC, and The Ring heavyweight titles
7	Win	6–0–1	Alfio Righetti	UD	10	Nov 18, 1977	Caesars Palace, Paradise, Nevada, U.S.	
6	Draw	5–0–1	Scott LeDoux	SD	10	Oct 22, 1977	The Aladdin, Paradise, Nevada, U.S.	
5	Win	5–0	Bruce Scott	KO	3 (8), 3:02	Jun 1, 1977	Forum, Montreal, Quebec, Canada	
4	Win	4–0	Pedro Agosto	KO	1 (8), 1:55	May 7, 1977	Kiel Auditorium, St. Louis, Missouri, U.S.	
3	Win	3–0	Jerry McIntyre	KO	1 (6), 0:35	Mar 20, 1977	Exposition Center, Louisville, Kentucky, U.S.	
2	Win	2–0	Peter Freeman	KO	1 (6), 1:26	Mar 5, 1977	Liverpool Stadium, Liverpool, England	
1	Win	1–0	Bob Smith	TKO	5 (6), 0:20	Jan 15, 1977	The Aladdin, Paradise, Nevada, U.S.	

== Titles in boxing ==
=== Major world titles ===
- NBA (WBA) heavyweight champion (175+ lbs)
- WBC heavyweight champion (175+ lbs)

=== The Ring magazine titles ===
- The Ring heavyweight champion (175+ lbs)

=== Regional/International titles ===
- NABF cruiserweight champion (200 lbs)
- WBC Continental Americas heavyweight champion (200+ lbs) (2×)

=== Undisputed titles ===
- Undisputed heavyweight champion

== See also ==
- List of heavyweight boxing champions
- List of undisputed world boxing champions
- List of WBC world champions
- List of WBC world champions
- List of The Ring world champions
- Notable boxing families

Sporting positions
Amateur boxing titles
Previous: D.C. Barker	U.S. light heavyweight champion 1974–1976	Next: Larry Strogen
Regional boxing titles
Vacant Title last held by S. T. Gordon	NABF cruiserweight champion October 31, 1982 – May 1984; Vacated	Vacant Title next held by Anthony Davis
Vacant Title last held by Michael Dokes	WBC Continental Americas heavyweight champion December 13, 1985 – March 1986; Vacated	Vacant Title next held by Adílson Rodrigues
Vacant Title last held by Adílson Rodrigues	WBC Continental Americas heavyweight champion April 28, 1987 – April 1988; Vacated	Vacant Title next held by Michael Dokes
World boxing titles
Preceded by Muhammad Ali	WBA heavyweight champion February 15, 1978 – September 15, 1978	Succeeded by Muhammad Ali
Preceded by Muhammad Ali	WBC heavyweight champion February 15, 1978 – March 18, 1978; Stripped	Vacant Title next held by Ken Norton
Preceded by Muhammad Ali	The Ring heavyweight champion February 15, 1978 – September 15, 1978	Succeeded by Muhammad Ali
Preceded by Muhammad Ali	Undisputed heavyweight champion February 15, 1978 – March 18, 1978; Titles fragmented	Vacant Title next held by Mike Tyson
Professional wrestling titles
Preceded by Tarzan Goto	WWA World Martial Arts heavyweight champion March 25, 1992 – May 24, 1992	Succeeded by Atsushi Onita
Awards
Previous: Muhammad Ali and Joe Frazier	BWAA Fighter of the Year; 1976; With: Howard Davis Jr., Sugar Ray Leonard, Leo Randolph, and Michael Spinks	Next: Ken Norton
Previous: George Foreman vs. Jimmy Young	The Ring Fight of the Year vs. Muhammad Ali; 1978	Next: Danny Lopez vs. Mike Ayala
Previous: Jorge Luján; KO10 Alfonso Zamora	The Ring Upset of the Year; SD15 Muhammad Ali; 1978	Next: Vito Antuofermo; SD15 Marvin Hagler
