= Morocco at the 2018 Winter Olympics =

- Flag of Morocco
- IOC code: MAR
- NOC: Moroccan Olympic Committee; Arabic: اللجنة الأولمبية الوطنية المغربية
- Website: www.cnom.org.ma (in French)

in Pyeongchang, South Korea 9–25 February 2018
- Competitors: 2 in 2 sports
- Flag bearer: Samir Azzimani (opening)
- Medals: Gold 0 Silver 0 Bronze 0 Total 0

Winter Olympics appearances (overview)
- 1968; 1972–1980; 1984; 1988; 1992; 1994–2006; 2010; 2014; 2018; 2022; 2026

Morocco competed at the 2018 Winter Olympics in Pyeongchang, South Korea, from 9 to 25 February 2018. The country's participation in Pyeongchang marked its seventh appearance in the Winter Olympics after its debut in the 1968 Winter Olympics.

Morocco was represented by two athletes who competed across two sports. Samir Azzimani served as the country's flag-bearer during the opening ceremony and a volunteer carried the flag during the closing ceremony. Morocco did not win any medals in the Games.

== Background ==
The Moroccan Olympic Committee was formed in 1959 and recognized by the International Olympic Committee in the same year. The nation made its first Olympics appearance as an independent nation at the 1960 Summer Olympics. The current edition marked its seventh appearance at the Winter Olympic Games, after it made its debut at the 1968 Winter Olympics. It has appeared in every edition of the Winter Olympics since the 2010 Winter Olympics in Vancouver.

The 2018 Winter Olympics were held in Pyeongchang, South Korea between 9 and 25 February 2018. Morocco was represented by two athletes, who competed across two sports. Samir Azzimani served as the country's flag-bearer during the opening ceremony, and a volunteer carried the flag during the closing ceremony. Morocco did not win a medal in the Games.

== Competitors ==
The following is the list of number of competitors participating in the Moroccan delegation per sport.

Sport	Men	Women	Total
Alpine skiing	1	0	1
Cross-country skiing	1	0	1
Total	2	0	2

== Alpine skiing ==
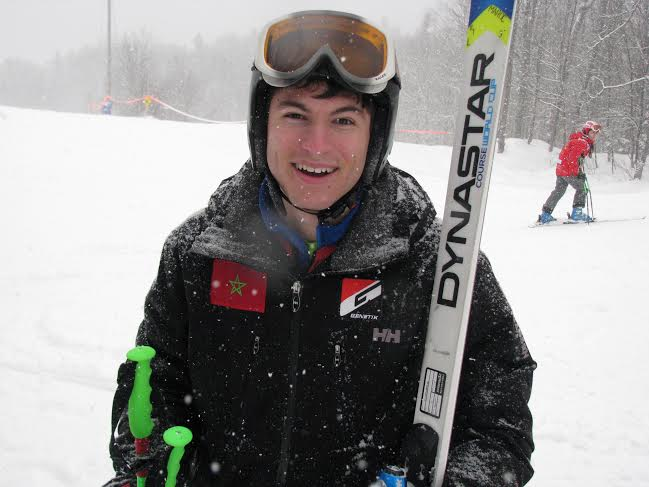
Adam Lamhamedi represented Morocco in alpine skiing

The qualification for the alpine skiing events were based on a combination of International Ski Federation (FIS) rankings and points secured in FIS events within a stipulated time frame before the Olympics. Morocco qualified one male athlete for the alpine skiing event at the Games. Adam Lamhamedi qualified to compete at the games, with his brother Sami Lamhamedi traveling as an alternate to provide injury cover to Adam. Born in Canada, Adam chose to represent the country of his paternal ancestry in the Olympics. Adam has won a gold medal in the 2012 Youth Winter Olympics, and had previously represented the country in the 2014 Winter Olympics.

The Alpine skiing events were held at the Jeongseon Alpine Centre in Bukpyeong. The course for the events was designed by former Olympic champion Bernhard Russi. The weather was cold and windy during the events, and it was the coldest since the 1994 Winter Olympics at Lillehammer. Adam did not finish in the men's slalom event. He finished 53rd amongst the 109 competitors in the men's giant slalom event.

Athlete	Event	Run 1		Run 2		Total	
Athlete	Event	Time	Rank	Time	Rank	Time	Rank
Adam Lamhamedi	Men's giant slalom	1:18.50	61	1:17.54	54	2:36.04	53
Adam Lamhamedi	Men's slalom	DNF					

== Cross-country skiing ==
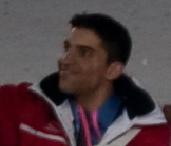
Samir Azzimani represented Morocco in cross-country skiing

As per the standards laid down by the International Ski Federation, athletes with a maximum of 300 points in the stipulated period were allowed to compete in the distance event. Morocco qualified a single athlete for the competition. Azzimani had previously competed for the country at the 2010 Winter Olympics in alpine skiing, and switched disciplines for these games.

The main events were held at the Alpensia Cross-Country Skiing Centre. Flag-bearer Mark completed the 15 km (9.3 mi) course in 38:40.8. He finished the race in 111th position (out of 119 competitors), nearly 14 minutes behind the winner, Dario Cologna of Switzerland.

Athlete	Event	Final		
Athlete	Event	Time	Deficit	Rank
Samir Azzimani	Men's 15 km freestyle	47:39.9	+13:56.0	111

== See also ==
- Morocco at the 2018 Summer Youth Olympics
