= Tazi =

Tazi may refer to:

- Afghan Hound or Tāzī, a hound
- a person from Taza, Morocco
- Chief Taza or Tazi, (c. 1843–1876), son of Cochise and chief of the Chiricahuas
- Tazi, a classification of horse in the Army of the Mughal Empire
- Tāzīg/Tāzīk/Tāzī, the word for "Arab" in Sasanian Persia

== People ==
- Abdallah Tazi (born 1945), Moroccan footballer
- Abdelhadi Tazi (1921–2015), Moroccan scholar, writer, historian and former ambassador
- Kenza Tazi (born 1996), Moroccan alpine skier
