= Yessin Rahmouni =

Moroccan dressage rider (born 1984)

Personal information
- Born: Yessin Rahmouni; 2 October 1984 (age 41) Haarlem, Netherlands

Sport
- Country: Morocco
- Sport: Equestrian
- Coached by: Anky van Grunsven

Achievements and titles
- Olympic finals: 2012 Olympic Games; 2020 Olympic Games; 2024 Olympic Games
- World finals: Caen 2014; Herning 2022

Yessin Rahmouni (also spelled Yassine, born 2 October 1984 in Haarlem, the Netherlands) is an Olympic dressage rider. Born in the Netherlands, he represents Morocco internationally. He competed at the 2012 Summer Olympics in London, where he finished 49th in the individual competition, making him the first dressage rider at the Olympics from the African continent. He also represented Morocco at the 2020 Summer Olympics in Tokyo, finishing 44th in the individual competition.

He competed twice at the World Championships, including the 2014 World Equestrian Games in Normandy where he finished 81st. He competed with Floresco, the former horse of Patrik Kittel, also the horse he competed at his first Olympics in London. In 2022 he competed at the 2022 FEI World Championships in Herning with his horse All At Once, which he competed at the Tokyo and Paris Olympics.

== Riding accident ==
In March 2024, Rahmouni had a serious accident. He fell from a young horse during training and broke his neck with three fractured vertebrae. As a result, Rahmouni had to recover for months and it was uncertain whether he would be able to get back on a horse. Because his rehabilitation went well, Rahmouni was able to resume his training a month before the Olympic Games and made it to his third Olympic Games. He finished 42nd at the 2024 Olympic Games in Paris in the individual Grand Prix with a result of 68.696% on his horse All At Once. This result was his highest result at the Olympic Games so far, and so for Morocco. At the opening ceremony of the Paris Olympics he was also flag bearer.

== Dressage results ==
=== Olympic Games ===
| Event | Rank | Score | Horse |
|---|---|---|---|
| (United Kingdom) London 2012 | 49th | 64.453% | Floresco NRW |
| (Japan) Tokyo 2020 | 44th | 66.599% | All At Once |
| (France) Paris 2024 | 42nd | 68.696% | All At Once |

=== World Championships ===
| Event | Rank | Score | Horse |
|---|---|---|---|
| (France) 2014 Normandy | 81st | 64.986% | Floresco NRW |
| (Denmark) 2022 Herning | 78th | 65.326 | All At Once |

=== World Cup Final ===
| Event | Rank | Score | Horse |
|---|---|---|---|
| (Germany) 2022 Leipzig | 13th | 73.679% | All At Once |

Olympic Games
| Preceded by Yassine Aouich | Flag bearer for Morocco; Paris 2024 with Ines Laklalech | Succeeded by Incumbent |
