= Hocine Tafer =

French boxer

Personal information
- Nationality: French
- Born: 16 March 1955 (age 70) Constantine, Algeria

Sport
- Sport: Boxing

Hocine Tafer (born 16 March 1955) is a French former professional boxer.

== Professional career ==
As an amateur, he competed in the men's light heavyweight event at the 1976 Summer Olympics. In his first fight, he lost to Juan Domingo Suárez of Argentina.
