= Oumaïma Belahbib =

Moroccan boxer (born 1996)

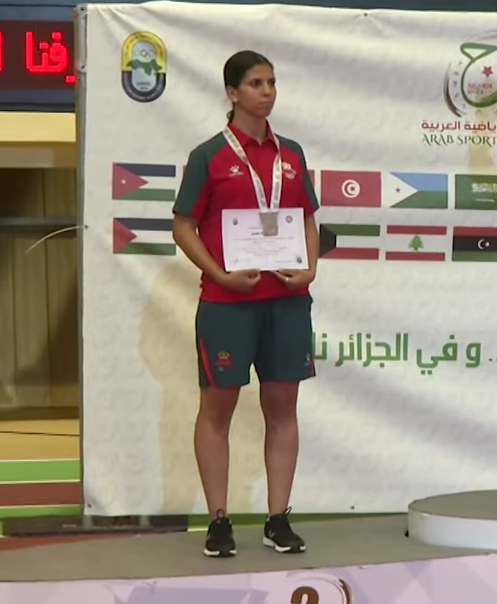
- Belahbibi in 2023

Personal information
- Born: 21 August 1996 (age 29) Morocco

Sport
- Sport: Boxing
- Weight class: Welterweight
Medal record
Representing Morocco
African Boxing Championships
Gold medal – first place	2017 Brazzaville	U64
Arab Games
Silver medal – second place	2023 Algiers	U66
African Games
Bronze medal – third place	2019 Rabat	U69
Mediterranean Games
Bronze medal – third place	2022 Oran	U66

Oumaïma Belahbib (born 21 August 1996), also known as Oumayma Belahbib or Oumayma Bel Ahbib, is a Moroccan amateur boxer, who won a gold medal at the 2017 African Amateur Boxing Championships, and a bronze medal at the 2019 African Games. She has competed in the welterweight (under 69 kg) event at the 2020 Summer Olympics.

== Career ==
At the 2017 African Amateur Boxing Championships in Brazzaville, Congo, Belahbib won the under-64 kg event. It was Morocco's first women's gold medal at the African Amateur Boxing Championships, and their only gold medal of the 2017 Championships. She won a bronze medal in the under-69 kg event at the 2019 African Games. Later in the year, she competed at the 2019 AIBA Women's World Boxing Championships, losing in the round of 16 to India's Lovlina Borgohain.

In January 2020, she won a bronze medal at the Nations Cup International Boxing Tournament, and in February 2020, Belahbib won her 2020 African Boxing Olympic Qualification Tournament under-69 kg event. As a result, she qualified for the welterweight (under 69 kg) event at the delayed 2020 Summer Olympics. Her place at the Games was assured after winning her semi-final against Kenyan Elizabeth Akinyi. In 2021, she won another bronze medal at the Nations Cup International Boxing Tournament. At the 2020 Olympics, Belahbib lost her round of 16 match to Ukrainian Anna Lysenko.

At the 2022 Mediterranean Games, Belahbib reached the semi-finals of the under-66kg event before withdrawing from the competition. As a result, she won a bronze medal.

Olympic Games
Preceded by Samir Azzimani	Flag bearer for Morocco; Tokyo 2020 with Ramzi Boukhiam	Succeeded by Yassine Aouich
