= Lane County Fair =

Annual fair in Eugene, Oregon, USA

Coordinates: 44.0439°N 123.1043°W

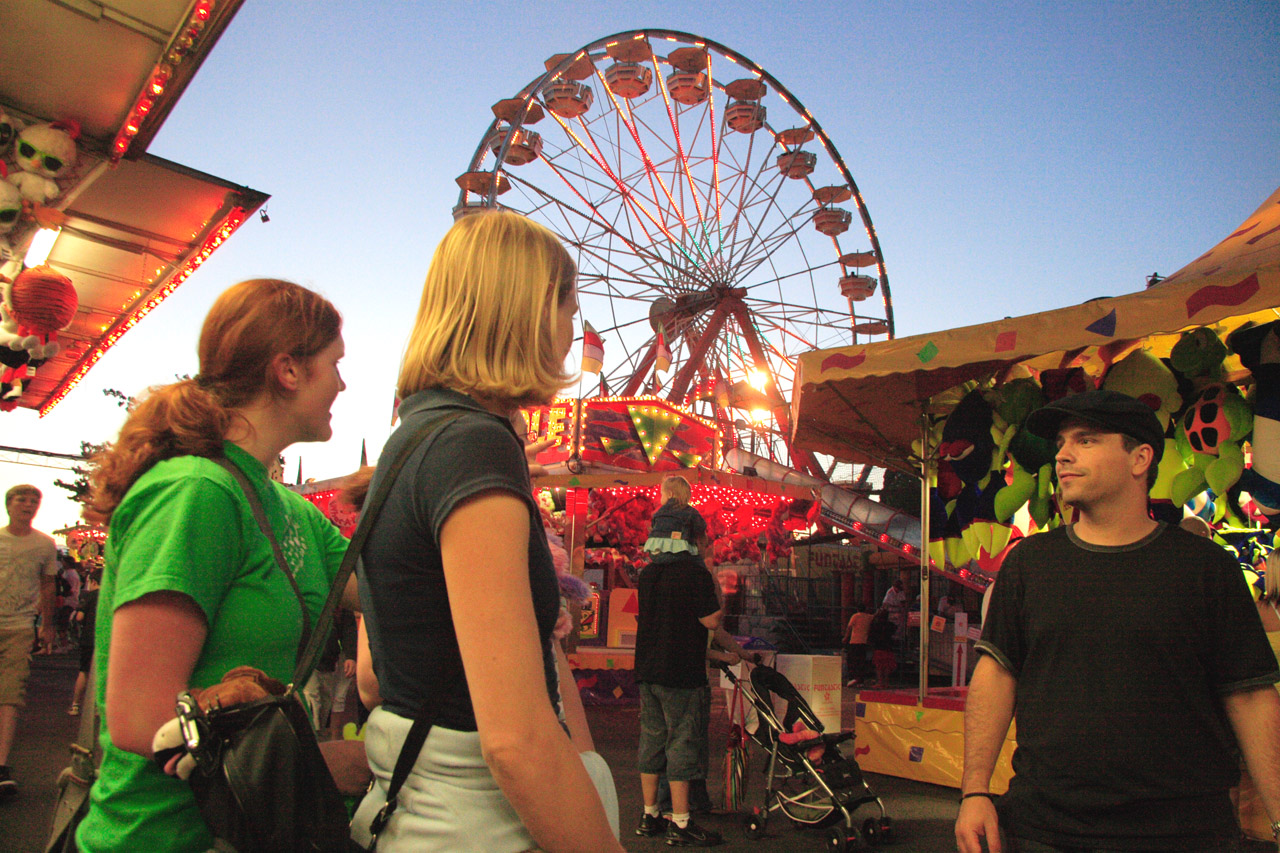
The Ferris wheel at the Lane County Fair.

Lane County Fair is a fair that is held during the summer in Eugene, Oregon, United States. It features cuisine, entertainment, and music.

A Lane County Agricultural Society was established in 1858, and on October 9, it hosted its inaugural show, which was still not regarded as fair. In 1860, a state agricultural association was established, and it was planned to host a state fair. From October 3 to October 4, 1860, a state fair was conducted close to Oregon City. On October 9 and 10, 1861, there was another fair. The inaugural "Lane County Fair" was held for three days on September 25, 1884.

== History ==
Before 1858 at Eugene, Oregon. Due to its favorable terrain and fertile soil, Eugene has been described as a natural center for agriculture. But farmers appear to make little money. this is due to the lack of suitable roadways for transporting goods between Eugene and the marketplaces in Portland. The only option to move such products was to use a steamship that sailed up the Willamette, but the cost of shipping was high. In response to these circumstances, farmers begin to get together and formed farmer's clubs, which are essentially communities where farmers share knowledge and methods to advance the American agricultural system. They exchange growing techniques and shipping advice.

Later in 1858 a Lane County Agricultural Society was formed and held the first exhibition on 9 October but still not considered fair. In 1859 Lane County Agricultural Society had another meeting on 7 April. The meeting was big enough that it was considered the advisability of holding a fair. This led to another meeting in the same year 7 December with the representative of other county societies. In another meeting on 22 February 1860, a state agricultural society was formed and decided to hold a state fair in 1860. Thus the first state fair was held from 3 October to 4 October 1860 near Oregon City. Another fair was on the 9th and 10 October 1861. After that Apparently, there were no fairs held. Finally, On 25 September 1884, The first official "Lane County Fair" was held for three days with the officers and members of Lane County Agricultural Society sponsorship. It was a success and the fairs were continuously held until 1910 with the help of granges the best exhibits were sent to Portland for advertisement and became known across the country. It stated that 1910 is the end of the pioneer fairs and the beginning of our present-day modern fairs.

There were no fairs in 1917-18, 1942-45 nor 2020-21.

== Events ==
The Lane County Fair features family entertainment, including shows, carnival rides and games. Attractions include a Ferris wheel offering views of the fairgrounds and Eugene. Each ride requires nine to ten tickets, with individual tickets costing 50 cents. Food vendors offer traditional fair foods, including cotton candy, elephant ears, barbecue and ice cream.

The fair also features exhibition halls with arts and crafts, agricultural displays and livestock exhibitions. Categories include beer and wine, floral arrangements, food preservation, textiles and photography. Horses, cattle, sheep, goats, rabbits and poultry are exhibited and judged in adult and youth competitions.

=== Entertainments & Exhibitions ===
==== Animal Exhibits ====
Animal Exhibits is about the animal and 4-H exhibits can be found at the south side of the fair indoors, along with the judgment of livestock to see a horse show.

==== All-Alaskan Racing Pigs ====
All-Alaskan Racing Pigs is the pig racing track that is one of the Lane County Fair's most famous attractions.

There is a team of pigs that are trained to run and jump over obstacles.

==== Tractor Pull ====
Tractor Pull is the tractor pedal pulling that kids can ride a mini tractor and ground-shaking at the fair.

==== Washboard Willy’s Jamboree ====
Washboard Willy is a children's entertainer who utilizes a collection of rhythmic toys designed to encourage musical participation. His performances typically consist of stage shows within designated children's areas, accompanied by ambulatory processions through fairgrounds.

==== Professor Smart, Family Fun stage ====
According to the fair's description, Professor Smart, a skilled juggler and comic, "brings science to life with narrative and cool demonstrations."

==== Toddler Zone ====
Toddler Zone is a family-run soft play rental business that brings a safe, entertaining environment. It engages the little children in imaginative and inquisitive activities.

==== Balloonacy ====
Balloonacy is a balloon carver who performs throughout the event in family and community fun arenas.

==== Balloon Ride ====
Younger children can go on the balloon ride. Cars revolve when hung from balloons.

==== Dragon Wagon ====
For smaller children, there is a multi-car dragon-shaped attraction called Dragon Wagon. It follows an oval-shaped trajectory on a wavy surface.

==== Vertigo and Kamikaze ====
There are two rides for adults and older children. Chairs began to spin and rise in vertigo. Unseen below the frame, Kamikaze pulls a sitting car in a wide arc.

==== The Elephant Ride ====
For older children and perhaps parents, there is an elephant ride. Elephants rotate around it, each with an adjustable arm.

==== Power Jump ====
On the Power Jump, children can flip and jump quite high. Each child jumps on a trampoline while hung from elastic cords. The addition of the elastic cords to the leap allows for extremely high jumps and the freedom to flip.

=== Foods and beverages ===
Featured foods include elephant ears (crunchy, cinnamon and sugar coated circles of fried dough, commonly referred to as fry bread) fried ravioli, grilled cheese with blackberries, pizza, beer, wine, barbecue, and ice cream.

=== Main Stage Concert ===
2022
Thursday July 21	T.I.
Friday July 22	KC and the Sunshine Band
Saturday July 23	Russell Dickerson
Sunday July 24	El Flaco

2021
Wednesday July 21	Marshall Tucker Band
Thursday July 22	Big & Rich
Friday July 23	Jefferson Starship
Saturday July 24	Nelly
Sunday July 25	Carly Pearce

==== 2020 ====
There was no fair held this year due to COVID-19 pandemic.

2019
Wednesday July 24	Chris Janson
Thursday July 25	Little River Band
Friday July 26	Martina Mcbride
Saturday July 27	LIFEHOUSE
Sunday July 28	Jana Kramer

2018
Wednesday July 18	Trace Adkins
Thursday July 19	Melissa Etheridge
Friday July 20	Night Ranger
Saturday July 21	Bill Engvall
Sunday July 22	High Valley

2017
Wednesday July 19	Eli Young Band
Thursday July 20	Bret Michaels
Friday July 21	Survivor & Loverboy
Saturday July 22	En Vogue
Sunday July 23	LeAnn Rimes

2016
Wednesday July 20	Kansas
Thursday July 21	Gary Allan
Friday July 22	Martina Mcbride
Saturday July 23	Rachel Platten
Sunday July 24	Joe Nichols
