= Miloslav Popović =

Yugoslav boxer (born 1952)

Personal information
- Nationality: Yugoslav
- Born: 9 August 1952 (age 73)

Sport
- Sport: Boxing

Miloslav Popović (born 9 August 1952) is a Yugoslav boxer. He competed in the men's light heavyweight event at the 1976 Summer Olympics.
