= Wolfgang Gruber =

German boxer (born 1953)

Personal information
- Nationality: German
- Born: 22 February 1953 (age 73) Worms, West Germany

Sport
- Sport: Boxing

Wolfgang Gruber (born 22 February 1953) is a German boxer. He competed in the men's light heavyweight event at the 1976 Summer Olympics, defeating Frederick Sabat of Kenya before losing to Sixto Soria of Cuba.
