= Morocco at the Olympics =

- IOC code: MAR
- NOC: Moroccan Olympic Committee
- Website: www.cnom.org.ma (in French)
- Medals Ranked 65th: Gold 8 Silver 5 Bronze 13 Total 26

Summer appearances
- 1960; 1964; 1968; 1972; 1976; 1980; 1984; 1988; 1992; 1996; 2000; 2004; 2008; 2012; 2016; 2020; 2024; 2028

Winter appearances
- 1968; 1972–1980; 1984; 1988; 1992; 1994–2006; 2010; 2014; 2018; 2022; 2026

Morocco first participated in the Olympic Games in 1960, and has sent athletes to compete in every Summer Olympic Games since then, except when they joined the American-led boycott of the 1980 Summer Olympics. Morocco also boycotted the 1976 Games, withdrawing after having initially sent a delegation. In doing so, Morocco joined the boycott of the Games by most African countries, in protest against New Zealand's participation following an All Blacks rugby match, unrelated to the Olympics, against an apartheid team from South Africa. Only one Moroccan representative had time to compete before his country's withdrawal: Abderahim Najim took part in the Men's Light Flyweight event in boxing, and lost his first and only match before joining the national contingent's premature departure.

Morocco has also participated in 9 Winter Olympic Games since 1968.

Moroccan athletes have won a total of 26 medals, 21 in athletics, four in boxing and one in football. Hicham El Guerrouj, with two gold medals and one silver medal, Saïd Aouita, with one gold and one bronze, Hasna Benhassi, with one silver and one bronze and Soufiane El Bakkali, with two gold medals are Morocco's four multiple medal winners.

The Moroccan Olympic Committee was created in 1959.

== Medal tables ==
=== Medals by Summer Games ===
Games	Athletes	Gold	Silver	Bronze	Total	Rank
(Italy) 1960 Rome	47	0	1	0	1	32
(Japan) 1964 Tokyo	20	0	0	0	0	–
1968 Mexico City	25	0	0	0	0	–
(Germany) 1972 Munich	35	0	0	0	0	–
(Canada) 1976 Montreal	9	0	0	0	0	–
(Soviet Union) 1980 Moscow	boycotted					
(United States) 1984 Los Angeles	34	2	0	0	2	18
(South Korea) 1988 Seoul	27	1	0	2	3	28
(Spain) 1992 Barcelona	53	1	1	1	3	31
(United States) 1996 Atlanta	34	0	0	2	2	68
(Australia) 2000 Sydney	61	0	1	4	5	58
(Greece) 2004 Athens	55	2	1	0	3	36
(China) 2008 Beijing	47	0	1	1	2	64
(United Kingdom) 2012 London	63	0	0	1	1	79
(Brazil) 2016 Rio de Janeiro	49	0	0	1	1	78
(Japan) 2020 Tokyo	48	1	0	0	1	63
(France) 2024 Paris	60	1	0	1	2	60
(United States) 2028 Los Angeles	future event					
(Australia) 2032 Brisbane	future event					
Total		8	5	13	26	65

=== Medals by Winter Games ===
Games	Athletes	Gold	Silver	Bronze	Total	Rank
(France) 1968 Grenoble	5	0	0	0	0	−
(Japan) 1972 Sapporo	did not participate					
(Austria) 1976 Innsbruck	did not participate					
(United States) 1980 Lake Placid	did not participate					
(Socialist Federal Republic of Yugoslavia) 1984 Sarajevo	4	0	0	0	0	−
(Canada) 1988 Calgary	3	0	0	0	0	−
(France) 1992 Albertville	12	0	0	0	0	−
(Norway) 1994 Lillehammer	did not participate					
(Japan) 1998 Nagano	did not participate					
(United States) 2002 Salt Lake City	did not participate					
(Italy) 2006 Turin	did not participate					
(Canada) 2010 Vancouver	1	0	0	0	0	−
(Russia) 2014 Sochi	2	0	0	0	0	−
(South Korea) 2018 Pyeongchang	2	0	0	0	0	−
(China) 2022 Beijing	1	0	0	0	0	−
(Italy) 2026 Milano Cortina	2	0	0	0	0	−
(France) 2030 French Alps	future event					
(United States) 2034 Utah	future event					
Total		0	0	0	0	–

=== Medals by summer sport ===
Sport	Gold	Silver	Bronze	Total
Athletics	8	5	8	21
Boxing	0	0	4	4
Football	0	0	1	1
Totals (3 entries)	8	5	13	26

== Athletes with most medals ==
Athlete	Sport	Games	Gold medal	Silver medal	Bronze medal	Total
Hicham El Guerrouj	Athletics	1996–2004	2	1	0	3
Soufiane El Bakkali	Athletics	2016–2024	2	0	0	2
Saïd Aouita	Athletics	1984–1988	1	0	1	2
Hasna Benhassi	Athletics	2000–2008	0	1	1	2

Notes: in Khaki the athletes still in activity.

== List of medalists ==
Medal	Name	Games	Sport	Event
Silver	Rhadi Ben Abdesselam	1960 Rome	Athletics	Men's marathon
Gold	Nawal El Moutawakel	1984 Los Angeles	Athletics	Women's 400 metre hurdles
Gold	Saïd Aouita	1984 Los Angeles	Athletics	Men's 5,000 metres
Gold	Brahim Boutayeb	1988 Seoul	Athletics	Men's 10,000 metres
Bronze	Saïd Aouita	1988 Seoul	Athletics	Men's 800 metres
Bronze	Abdelhak Achik	1988 Seoul	Boxing	Men's featherweight
Gold	Khalid Skah	1992 Barcelona	Athletics	Men's 10,000 metres
Silver	Rachid El Basir	1992 Barcelona	Athletics	Men's 1,500 metres
Bronze	Mohammed Achik	1992 Barcelona	Boxing	Men's bantamweight
Bronze	Salah Hissou	1996 Atlanta	Athletics	Men's 10,000 metres
Bronze	Khalid Boulami	1996 Atlanta	Athletics	Men's 5,000 metres
Silver	Hicham El Guerrouj	2000 Sydney	Athletics	Men's 1,500 metres
Bronze	Ali Ezzine	2000 Sydney	Athletics	Men's 3,000 metre steeplechase
Bronze	Nezha Bidouane	2000 Sydney	Athletics	Women's 400 metre hurdles
Bronze	Brahim Lahlafi	2000 Sydney	Athletics	Men's 5,000 metres
Bronze	Tahar Tamsamani	2000 Sydney	Boxing	Men's featherweight
Gold	Hicham El Guerrouj	2004 Athens	Athletics	Men's 1,500 metres
Gold	Hicham El Guerrouj	2004 Athens	Athletics	Men's 5,000 metres
Silver	Hasna Benhassi	2004 Athens	Athletics	Women's 800 metres
Silver	Jaouad Gharib	2008 Beijing	Athletics	Men's marathon
Bronze	Hasna Benhassi	2008 Beijing	Athletics	Women's 800 metres
Bronze	Abdalaati Iguider	2012 London	Athletics	Men's 1500 metres
Bronze	Mohammed Rabii	2016 Rio de Janeiro	Boxing	Men's welterweight
Gold	Soufiane El Bakkali	2020 Tokyo	Athletics	Men's 3000 metres steeplechase
Gold	Soufiane El Bakkali	2024 Paris	Athletics	Men's 3000 metres steeplechase
Bronze	Men's Football team: Munir Mohamedi Achraf Hakimi Akram Nakach Mehdi Boukamir Adil Tahif Benjamin Bouchouari Eliesse Ben Seghir Bilal El Khannouss Soufiane Rahimi Ilias Akhomach Zakaria El Ouahdi Rachid Ghanimi Yassine Kechta Oussama Targhalline El Mehdi Maouhoub Abde Ezzalzouli Oussama El Azzouzi Amir Richardson	2024 Paris	Football	Men's competition

== See also ==
- List of flag bearers for Morocco at the Olympics
- Category:Olympic competitors for Morocco
- Morocco at the Paralympics
- Morocco at the Youth Olympics
- Sports in Morocco
