= Morocco at the 2014 Winter Olympics =

- IOC code: MAR
- NOC: Moroccan Olympic Committee; Arabic: اللجنة الأولمبية الوطنية المغربية
- Website: www.cnom.org.ma (in French)

in Sochi
- Competitors: 2 in 1 sport
- Flag bearers: Adam Lamhamedi (opening and closing)
- Medals: Gold 0 Silver 0 Bronze 0 Total 0

Winter Olympics appearances (overview)
- 1968; 1972–1980; 1984; 1988; 1992; 1994–2006; 2010; 2014; 2018; 2022; 2026

Morocco competed at the 2014 Winter Olympics in Sochi, Russia. The country's participation at Sochi marked its sixth appearance at a Winter Olympics since its debut at the 1968 Games; no athlete has ever won any medals. Sochi 2014 marked the first time the Moroccan Olympic team competed in Russia as Morocco and 63 other Western nations took part in the US-led boycott of the 1980 Summer Olympics in Moscow due to the Soviet invasion of Afghanistan. The 2014 delegation consisted of two athletes competing in alpine skiing, Adam Lamhamedi and Kenza Tazi, who were accompanied by Adam's brother Sami and four officials. Adam Lamhamedi was also the nation's flag bearer in the Parade of Nations, and at the closing ceremony. Neither skier finished on a medal podium.

== Background ==
Morocco participated in six Winter Olympics between its debut at the 1968 Winter Olympics in Grenoble, France, and the 2014 Winter Olympics in Sochi, Russia. By the 2014 Games, no Moroccan athlete had ever won a medal at a Winter Games, excluding the Youth Games.

According to the final quota allocation released on 20 January 2014, Morocco had two athletes in qualification position. Mustapha Nait Lhou, the president of the Moroccan Ski Association, said that this made Morocco "the most represented among African Arab nations." Adam Lamhamedi was the sole male athlete in the Moroccan delegation at the 2014 Winter Games. Lamhamedi was seventeen at the time of the Sochi Games, having been eligible to represent the country through his Moroccan father. Lamhamedi had represented the country at the inaugural Winter Youth Olympics in 2012, held in Innsbruck, Austria.

At those Games, Lamhamedi won the gold medal in the boy's super-G competition. At the time, he said "I wanted to prove that Moroccans can ski well, and I proved it. This represents that in life you can do everything, never give up." This achievement meant that he was the first African competitor to win a medal of any colour at a Winter Olympics event. During the ski season prior to the Sochi Games, Lamhamedi qualified to compete at the Olympics by receiving the required number of points.

Boston born Kenza Tazi was the sole female athlete competing for Morocco at the 2014 Winter Olympics. She had skied from the age of three onwards, and said her hero was American skier Bode Miller. At the time of the start of the 2014 Games, she was also 17; she celebrated her 18th birthday while in Sochi. She chose to represent Morocco over the United States as the Moroccan Ski Association offered to fund her training. Tazi qualified for the Sochi Olympics after competing successfully at a number of qualification events, despite injury problems. Also accompanying the two athletes was a third skier, Sami Lamhamedi, the brother of Adam. However, Sami did not compete in events, and was only there as a potential substitute. These athletes were also accompanied by four officials.

== Alpine skiing ==
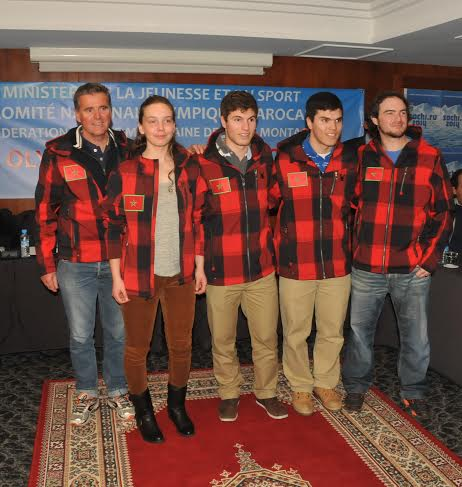
Part of the Moroccan delegation at the 2014 Winter Olympics

Adam Lamhamedi acted as Morocco's flag bearer in the Parade of Nations and at the closing ceremony. He played down his medal chances, saying "The best guys are between 26 and 36 years old, I'm 18, any skier's dream is to go to the Olympics and ski with the best. You learn a lot from these experiences; Morocco, this is not a country where people expect medals at the Winter Games. Just to represent an African country in skiing is something."

Lamhamedi competed in the men's giant slalom on 19 February. In his first run, he finished in 51st position with a time of one minute and 29.27 seconds. This second run was slightly slower, but his position increased to 48th in a time of one minute and 29.96 seconds. This gave him an overall position of 47th (two minutes and 29.23 seconds), just ahead of Alexandru Barbu from Romania (two minutes and 29.24 seconds) but immediately behind Armenia's Arman-Ted Serebrakian. The event was won by Ted Ligety of the United States in a time of two minutes and 45.29 seconds.

Lamhamedi also competed in the slalom on 22 February. In his first run, he finished in 51st position with a time of 54.47 seconds, directly behind Adam Barwood from New Zealand (54.21 seconds) and ahead of Bosnia and Herzegovina's Igor Laikert (54.68 seconds). However, Lamhamedi failed to complete his second run, and so ended the slalom competition without a final position.

Kenza Tazi admitted that she was not expecting to win medals, saying "I'll try to enjoy myself. I have not the art, nor the experience to win a medal at this major sporting event, so I fear things differently. I'm here primarily to ski and to better improve my abilities." She competed in the women's giant slalom on 18 February. In her first run, she finished in 69th place with a time of one minute and 35.27 seconds. Her second run and placement was improved; joint 61st place with a time of one minute and 34.52 seconds. This gave her the overall position of 62nd in a combined time of three minutes and 9.79 seconds, just ahead of Turkish skier Tuğba Daşdemir Kocaağa (three minutes and 9.8 seconds), but behind Triin Tobi from Estonia (three minutes and 9.17 seconds). The gold medallist was Slovenia's Tina Maze with an overall time of two minutes and 36.87 seconds.

Tazi also competed in the slalom on 21 February. After her first run of the day, in one minute and 10.19 seconds, she was in 56th place. She recorded an improved time of one minute and 6.96 seconds, placing her in 45th place for the second run. This meant her overall time of two minutes and 17.15 seconds placed her in 45th position, just ahead of Tobi (two minutes and 20.45 seconds) but behind Ivana Bulatović of Montenegro (two minutes and 12.8 seconds). Mikaela Shiffrin was the gold medallist in an overall time of one minute and 44.54 seconds.

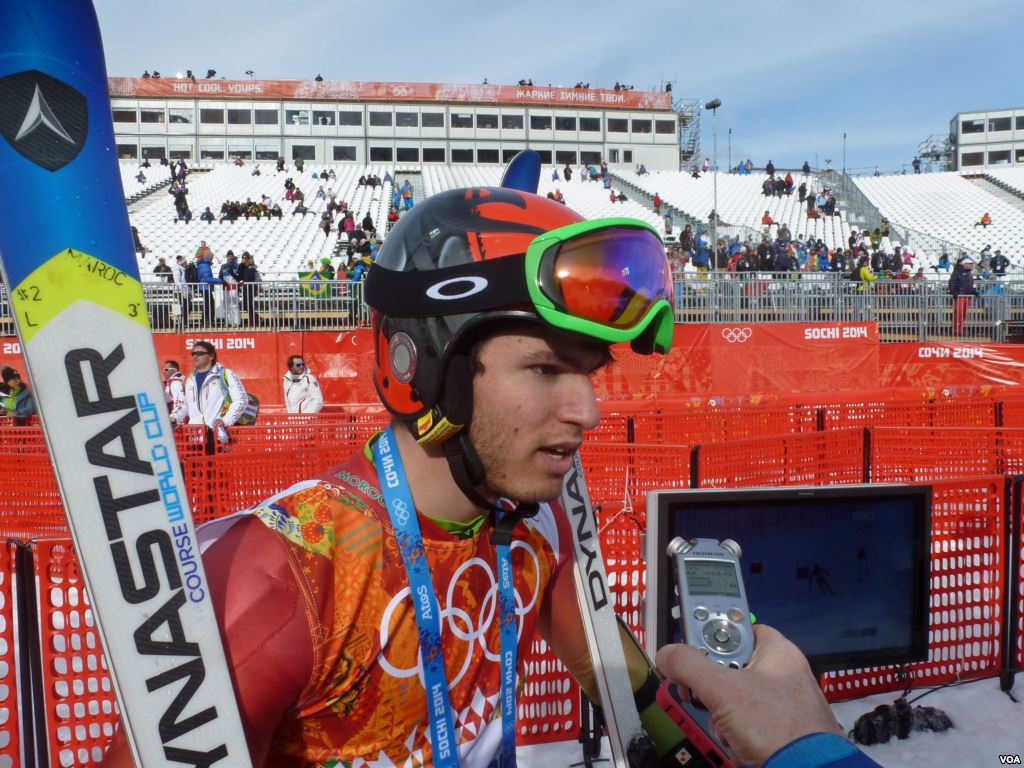
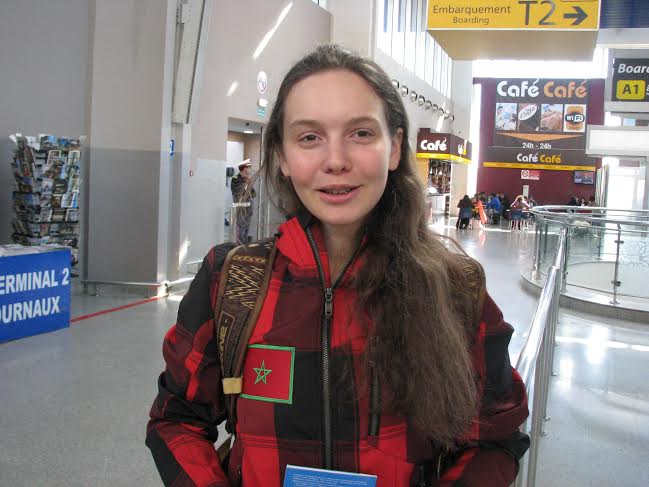
Skiers Adam Lamhamedi (left) and Kenza Tazi (right) at the 2014 Sochi Olympics

Skiing events

Athlete	Event	Run 1		Run 2		Total	
Athlete	Event	Time	Rank	Time	Rank	Time	Rank
Adam Lamhamedi	Men's giant slalom	1:29.27	51	1:29.96	48	2:59.23	47
Adam Lamhamedi	Men's slalom	54.47	51	Did not finish			
Kenza Tazi	Women's giant slalom	1:35.27	69	1:34.52	=61	3:09.79	62
Kenza Tazi	Women's slalom	1:10.19	56	1:06.96	45	2:17.15	45
