= Robert Burgess (boxer) =

Bermudian boxer (born 1952)

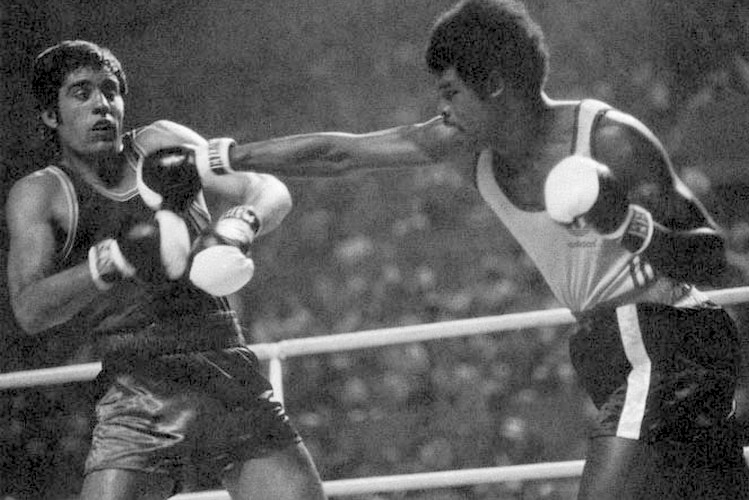
- Dafinoiu vs. Burgess at the 1976 Olympics

Personal information
- Born: December 21, 1952 (age 73) Charlotte, NC
- Died: 1982 Bermuda
- Height: 182 cm (6 ft 0 in)
- Weight: 76 kg (168 lb)

Sport
- Sport: Boxing

Robert Burgess (born December 21, 1952) is a retired amateur boxer from Bermuda. He competed at the 1976 Summer Olympics, but was eliminated in the third bout by Costică Dafinoiu.
