= Ines Laklalech =

Moroccan professional golfer

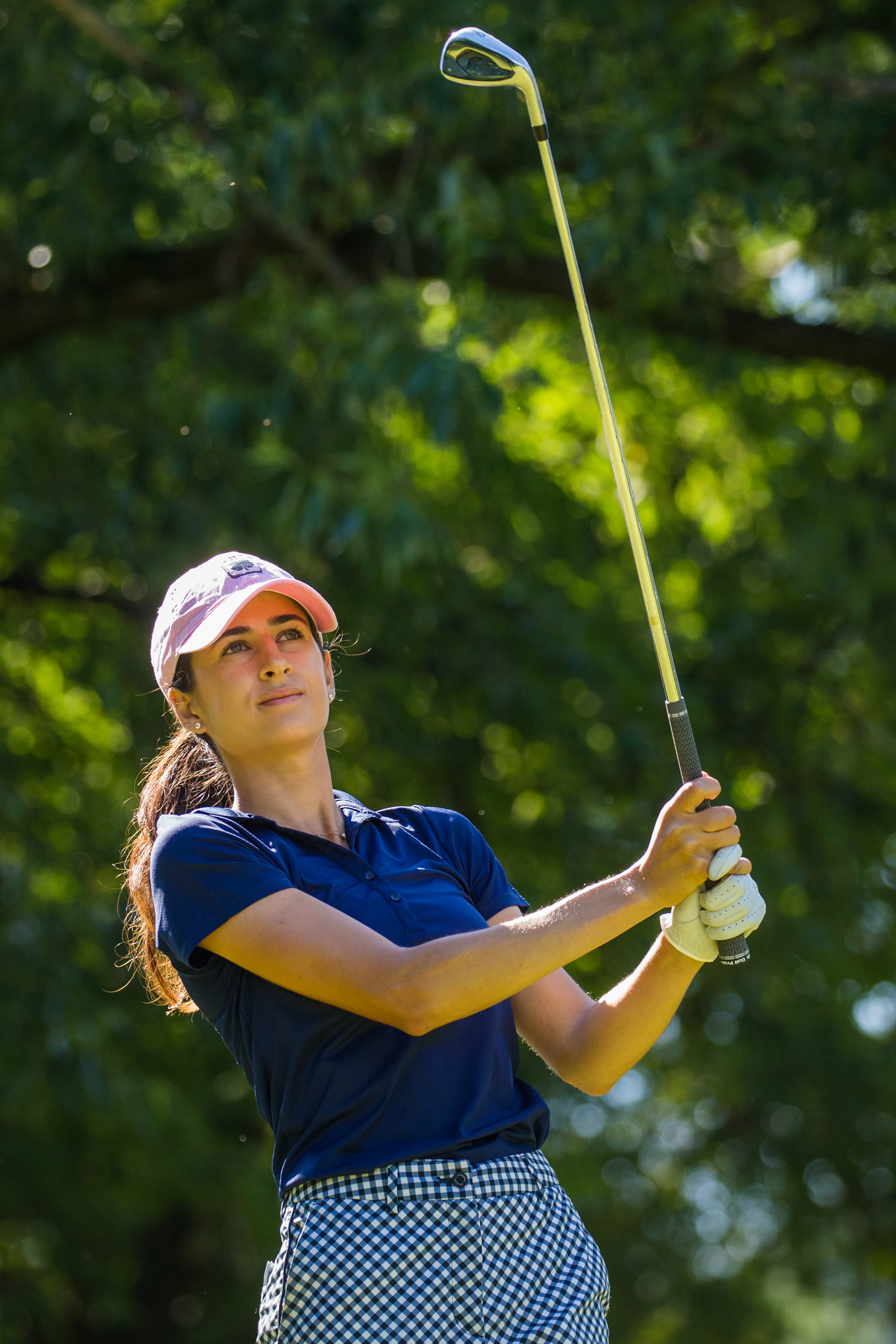

Personal information
- Nationality: Morocco
- Born: 30 October 1997 (age 29) Casablanca, Morocco

Career
- Sport: Golf
- College: Wake Forest University; University College London
- Turned professional: 2022
- Current tour: Ladies European Tour (joined 2022)
- Former tour: LPGA Tour
- Professional wins: 1

Number of wins by tour
- Ladies European Tour: 1

Best results in LPGA major championships
- Chevron Championship: DNP
- Women's PGA C'ship: CUT: 2023
- U.S. Women's Open: DNP
- Women's British Open: DNP
- Evian Championship: CUT: 2023

Ines Laklalech (born 30 October 1997) is a Moroccan professional golfer who plays on the Ladies European Tour and the LPGA Tour. She won the 2022 Lacoste Ladies Open de France on her rookie year to become the first Moroccan and North African woman to win a title on the LET.

== Early life and amateur career ==
Laklalech was born in Casablanca, Morocco and started playing golf at the age of 10. She was introduced to the game by her father at the Royal Golf d'Anfa in Casablanca. Laklalech joined the Moroccan National Team at the age of 12, and represented her country several times at the African Championship, Pan Arab Championship and at the World Women's Amateur Team Championships, the Espirito Santo Trophy, in 2016 and 2018.

After obtaining her French Baccalauréat in 2015 from Lycée Lyautey, Laklalech attended Wake Forest University and played with the Demon Deacons women's golf team 2015–16.

In 2019, Laklalech made two starts on the LET Access Series and finished runner-up at the Belfius Ladies Open. She made the cut at the 2020 Aramco Saudi Ladies International, her first LET event.

== Professional career ==
Laklalech turned professional after she finished 15th at LET Q- School in La Manga in December 2021, securing her card for the 2022 Ladies European Tour.

In her rookie season, Laklalech finished top-10 at the Madrid Ladies Open, The Mithra Belgian Ladies Open, Amundi German Masters and Skaftö Open, before sealing her maiden victory at the Lacoste Ladies Open de France, defeating Meghan MacLaren on the first playoff hole.

== Amateur wins ==
- 2018 The Arab Ladies Championship
- 2019 Moroccan Championship
- 2020 Grand Prix Mohammedia

== Professional wins (1) ==
=== Ladies European Tour wins (1) ===
No.	Date	Tournament	Winning score	To par	Margin of victory	Runner-up
1	17 Sep 2022	Lacoste Ladies Open de France	65-66-68=199	−14	Playoff	(England) Meghan MacLaren

== Team appearances ==
- Espirito Santo Trophy (representing Morocco): 2016, 2018

Olympic Games
Preceded by Yassine Aouich	Flag bearer for Morocco; Paris 2024 with Yessin Rahmouni	Succeeded by Incumbent
