= Vilmos Jakab =

Hungarian boxer (1952–2024)

Personal information
- Nationality: Hungarian
- Born: 9 February 1952 Pápasalamon, Hungary
- Died: 20 December 2024 (aged 72)

Sport
- Sport: Boxing

Vilmos Jakab (9 February 1952 – 20 December 2024) was a Hungarian boxer. He competed in the men's light heavyweight event at the 1976 Summer Olympics. Jakab died on 20 December 2024, at the age of 72.
