= Faïçal Laraïchi =

Moroccan business executive

Faïçal Laraïchi (born 1961) is president of the Moroccan Olympic Committee and president of the Société Nationale de Radiodiffusion et de Télévision (SNRT).

== Early life ==
He was born Meknès, Morocco.

Laraïchi earned his diploma in engineering from École Spéciale des Travaux Publics in Paris. He earned a Master of Science from Stanford University.

In 2009, he was the president of the Royal Moroccan Tennis Federation. In June 2017, he was appointed president of the Moroccan Olympic Committee.

He is also the Executive Vice President of the Marrakesh International Film Festival Foundation.
