= Morocco at the 2026 Winter Olympics =

- Flag of Morocco
- IOC code: MAR
- NOC: Moroccan Olympic Committee
- Website: www.cnom.org.ma (in French)

in Milan and Cortina d'Ampezzo, Italy 6 February 2026 – 22 February 2026
- Competitors: 2 (2 men) in 2 sports
- Flag bearer (opening): Pietro Tranchina
- Flag bearer (closing): Volunteer
- Medals: Gold 0 Silver 0 Bronze 0 Total 0

Winter Olympics appearances (overview)
- 1968; 1972–1980; 1984; 1988; 1992; 1994–2006; 2010; 2014; 2018; 2022; 2026

Morocco competed at the 2026 Winter Olympics in Milan and Cortina d'Ampezzo, Italy, from 6 to 22 February 2026.

Alpine skier Pietro Tranchina was the country's flagbearer during the opening ceremony. Meanwhile, a volunteer was the country's flagbearer during the closing ceremony.

== Competitors ==
The following is the list of number of competitors participating at the Games per sport/discipline.

Sport	Men	Women	Total
Alpine skiing	1	0	1
Cross-country skiing	1	0	1
Total	2	0	2

== Alpine skiing ==
Morocco qualified one male alpine skier through the basic quota.

Men

Athlete	Event	Run 1		Run 2		Total	
Athlete	Event	Time	Rank	Time	Rank	Time	Rank
Pietro Tranchina	Giant slalom	DNF					
Pietro Tranchina	Slalom	DNS					

== Cross-country skiing ==
Morocco did not earn a quota through the FIS Nordic World Ski Championships 2025 or the 2025 Nordic Junior World Ski Championships. However, Morocco received one of ten remaining quotas for men. Athletes had to score less than 300.00 FIS points at one FIS World Cup competition in the first World Cup period (28 November – 14 December 2025).

Athlete	Event	Final		
Athlete	Event	Time	Deficit	Rank
Abderrahim Kemmissa	Men's 10 km freestyle	27:54.5	+7:18.3	103
