= Boxing at the 2022 Mediterranean Games – Women's welterweight =

Boxing competitions

Women's welterweight at the 2022 Mediterranean Games
- Venue: EMEC Hall
- Date: 27 June – 1 July
- Competitors: 7 from 7 nations

Medalists
| gold medal | Busenaz Sürmeneli | Turkey |
| silver medal | Ichrak Chaib | Algeria |
| bronze medal | Oumaïma Belahbib | Morocco |
| bronze medal | Melissa Gemini | Italy |

The women's welterweight competition of the boxing events at the 2022 Mediterranean Games in Oran, Algeria, was held from 27 June to 1 July at the EMEC Hall.

Like all Mediterranean Games boxing events, the competition was a straight single-elimination tournament. Both semifinal losers were awarded bronze medals, so no boxers competed again after their first loss.

== Results ==
Quarterfinals
Fatia Benmessahel (FRA) | 1
Oumaïma Belahbib (MAR) | 2
Melissa Gemini (ITA) | 3
Arwa Khaled (EGY) | 0
Nikolina Gajić (SRB)
Busenaz Sürmeneli (TUR) | RSC

Semifinals
Ichrak Chaib (ALG) | WO
Oumaïma Belahbib (MAR)
Melissa Gemini (ITA) | 0
Busenaz Sürmeneli (TUR) | 3

Final
Ichrak Chaib (ALG) | 0
Busenaz Sürmeneli (TUR) | 5
