= Georgi Stoimenov =

Bulgarian boxer

Personal information
- Nationality: Bulgarian
- Born: 17 April 1952 (age 72)

Sport
- Sport: Boxing

Georgi Stoimenov (Bulgarian: Георги Стоименов; born 17 April 1952) is a Bulgarian boxer. He competed in the men's light heavyweight event at the 1976 Summer Olympics.
