= Anatoliy Klimanov =

Ukrainian boxer

Personal information
- Nationality: Ukrainian
- Born: 28 October 1949 Kyiv, Ukrainian SSR, Soviet Union
- Died: 2 March 2009 (aged 59) Kyiv, Ukraine

Sport
- Sport: Boxing
Medal record
Representing the Soviet Union
World championships
Bronze medal – third place	1974 Havana	Light Middleweight
European championships
Gold medal – first place	1973 Belgrade	Light Middleweight
Gold medal – first place	1975 Katowice	Light Heavyweight

Anatoliy Klimanov (28 October 1949 – 2 March 2009) was a Ukrainian boxer. He competed in the men's light heavyweight event at the 1976 Summer Olympics. Klimanov defeated Roger Fortin of Canada, before losing to Leon Spinks of the United States.
