= Morocco at the 2010 Winter Olympics =

- IOC code: MAR
- NOC: Moroccan Olympic Committee; Arabic: اللجنة الأولمبية الوطنية المغربية
- Website: www.cnom.org.ma (in French)

in Vancouver, Canada
- Competitors: 1 in 1 sport
- Flag bearer: Samir Azzimani
- Medals: Gold 0 Silver 0 Bronze 0 Total 0

Winter Olympics appearances (overview)
- 1968; 1972–1980; 1984; 1988; 1992; 1994–2006; 2010; 2014; 2018; 2022; 2026

Morocco competed in the 2010 Winter Olympics in Vancouver, British Columbia, Canada. The country's participation at Vancouver marked its fifth appearance at a Winter Olympics since its debut in 1968; no athlete had won any medals. The 2010 delegation consisted of a single athlete competing in alpine skiing, Samir Azzimani, who was also the nation's flag bearer in the Parade of Nations. Azzimani brought a group of schoolchildren from a suburb of Metz, France, which had seen rioting in January that year. Azzimani was one of three African skiers at the Games, and did not win any medals.

== Background ==
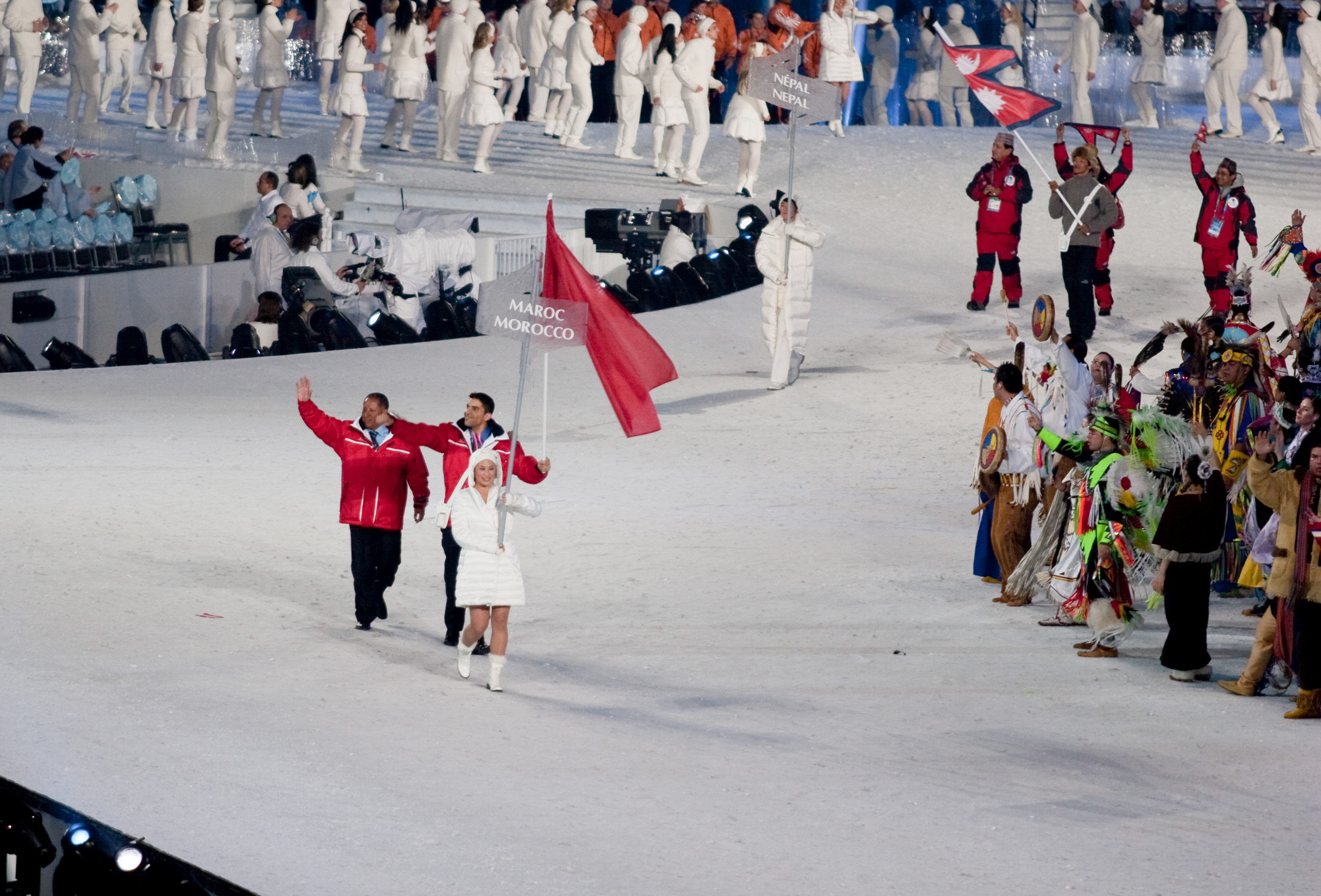
The Moroccan delegation entering the stadium during the opening ceremony

Morocco participated in five Winter Olympics between its debut at the 1968 Winter Olympics in Grenoble, France, and the 2010 Winter Olympics in Vancouver, British Columbia, Canada. No Moroccan athlete has ever won a medal at a Winter Games.

Alpine skiing Samir Azzimani was chosen as the sole Moroccan representative for the 2010 Winter Games. The French-born former ski instructor had previously attempted to qualify for the 2002 Winter Olympics in Salt Lake City, United States, and was injured during the qualification period for the 2006 Winter Olympics in Turin, Italy. Azzimani managed to qualify for the men's slalom events at the 2010 Games after gathering points by competing at skiing events around the world. Azzimani was also selected to be the flag bearer in the Parade of Nations during the opening ceremony.

Accompanying Azzimani to the Olympics, was a group of eight schoolchildren from Woippy, a suburb of the French city Metz. Azzimani had organised the trip for the children, who were from an area which saw rioting following the death of a man fleeing police in January 2010. He said in an interview prior to the games that the trip for the children was more important than his own, and related it to being introduced to being introduced to skiing on a school trip of his own at the age of six years old.

== Alpine skiing ==
The sole Moroccan athlete at the Games, Samir Azzimani, competed in both the men's giant slalom and men's slalom. He was one of three skiers representing African nations, with others hailing from Ghana and Senegal. He said in reference to the other African skiers, "If I beat them, I'll be the champion of Africa."

In the giant slalom, he registered times of 1:32.02 and 1:34.61 in his two runs, placing overall in 74th place, while in the slalom his runs were of 1:00.43 and 1:02.00 in length, with Azzimani coming in 44th place. This placed him ahead of Kwame Nkrumah-Acheampong of Ghana, who finished in 47th place in the slalom, but one place behind Leyti Seck of Senegal in the giant slalom.

Athlete	Event	Run 1	Run 2	Total	Rank
Samir Azzimani	Men's giant slalom	1:32.02	1:34.61	3:06.63	74
Samir Azzimani	Men's slalom	1:00.43	1:02.00	2:02.43	44
