= The Royal Moroccan Golf Federation =

Royal Moroccan Golf Federation
- Fédération Royale Marocaine de Golf
- Abbreviation: FRMG
- Formation: 12 March 1960
- Type: National sports association
- Legal status: Active
- Purpose: Promotion, regulation, and development of golf in Morocco
- Headquarters: 5, rue Cadi Mehdi Moreno, La Pinède Souissi, Rabat, Morocco
- Region served: Morocco
- President: His Royal Highness Prince Moulay Rachid
- Main organ: Federal Committee
- Affiliations: International Golf Federation, Arab Golf Federation, The Royal and Ancient
- Website: https://frmg.ma/

The Royal Moroccan Golf Federation (RMGF; French: Fédération Royale Marocaine de Golf) is the national sports association responsible for the promotion, regulation, and development of golf in the Kingdom of Morocco. It was established on March 12, 1960. In 2018, His Royal Highness Prince Moulay Rachid was elected President of the Royal Moroccan Golf Federation.

The Royal Moroccan Golf Federation designs and implements programs, competitions, and initiatives aimed at fostering the sport’s development and contributing to Morocco’s athletic, economic, social and tourism sectors. It is focused on broadening access to the sport, increasing participation, and developing athletes capable of competing on major international circuits and improving global rankings through athletic development, economic impact, and education.

== Activities ==
Operating in accordance with Law No. 30-09, the Royal Moroccan Golf Federation pursues its mandate through a structured approach to organization, growth, and influence. It facilitates nationwide access to golf through inclusive programs and training initiatives. The Federation also supports elite athletes and coordinates their participation in major tournaments.

== History ==
The Royal Moroccan Golf Federation was established in 1960 to serve as the national governing body for golf in Morocco.

In 1971, the Federation launched the Hassan II Trophy, a major golf tournament in Morocco.

In 1993 RMGF launched Lalla Meryem Cup, a professional women’s tournament that later became part of the Ladies European Tour.

In 2004, the Federation introduced the Throne Cup, a domestic competition aimed at promoting competitive golf within the country.

In 2012, Maha Haddioui became the first Arab female golfer to earn full playing status on a major professional circuit by joining the Ladies European Tour.

In 2018, His Royal Highness Prince Moulay Rachid was elected President of the Royal Moroccan Golf Federation. In 2019, under his leadership, the RMGF introduced a strategic vision for golf development in Morocco.

In 2022, Ines Laklalech became the first Arab woman to win a tournament on a major professional tour, (Lacoste Ladies Open de France). That same year, Morocco won the All-Africa Golf Team Championship.

In 2023 His Royal Highness Prince Moulay Rachid was re-elected as President. Ines Laklalech joined the LPGA Tour, becoming the first Arab female golfer with full status on the circuit. The same year, seven Moroccan women participated in the Lalla Meryem Cup, Moroccan team won the Arab Amateur Team Championship and Ayoub Lguirati won the first Arab Professional Championship.

In 2024, the Moroccan women’s team won the All-Africa Challenge Trophy.

== Development programs ==
=== Introductory programs ===
The RMGF promotes golf initiation programs across schools and universities, providing students with opportunities to discover the sport in an educational context. The Federation also encourages similar initiatives for corporations, professional associations, and families. These programs introduce participants to golf during specially organized discovery days.

=== Golf schools ===
The RMGF collaborates with clubs to establish and operate golf schools for young players. These schools provide instruction in technical skills within a structured environment. The Federation supplies equipment and financial assistance, while participating clubs are responsible for delivering training, monitoring progress, and encouraging participation in junior competitions.

=== First tee Morocco ===
In 2019, the RMGF partnered with First Tee USA to establish the First Tee Morocco chapter. This program aims to teach life skills through golf. First Tee Morocco promotes personal development and social inclusion through golf-based instruction, with a focus on values such as integrity, respect, and responsibility.

=== Sports-studies program ===
The RMGF has established a sports-studies initiative to support the development of talented young golfers with academic and athletic aspirations. The program provides financial, logistical, and technical support.

=== Road to Lydex ===
Launched in 2023, this program identifies and trains junior golfers with potential for integration into the Sports-Studies Excellence High School at the Mohammed VI Polytechnic University (UM6P). The program combines academic education with advanced golf training delivered through the university’s Golf Academy.

=== Lydex Sports-Studies ===
Located within UM6P, this institution offers a dual academic and athletic curriculum from the first year of high school. In 2023, the RMGF entered into a partnership with UM6P to jointly oversee the development of student-golfers—UM6P managing academics and the RMGF ensuring athletic training and performance support.

=== Road to the Tour 2021–2031 ===
A long-term initiative, launched in 2021, that focuses on early talent identification and progression toward international competition. It dedicates 70% of its resources to development and 30% to high-performance pathways. The program includes technical training and guidance for student-athletes aiming to access collegiate golf programs, particularly in the United States.

=== High-level training ===
The Federation collaborates with clubs and coaches to prepare competitive athletes for international circuits. It supports the training of certified coaches and localized development programs.

=== Team Morocco ===
Following Morocco’s success at the inaugural Arab Professional Championship, the RMGF launched a support program for professional players.

=== Women’s development program ===
As a signatory of the R&A Women in Golf Charter, the RMGF supports the expansion of women’s participation in golf through training initiatives, awareness efforts, and dedicated competitions.

== Affiliations and partnerships ==
The Royal Moroccan Golf Federation is a member of the International Golf Federation, the global governing body responsible for overseeing the development of golf. It also holds a position on the Executive Board of the Arab Golf Federation. The RMGF works with The Royal & Ancient, one of the major global authorities in golf.

In coordination with the Moroccan National Olympic Committee, the Federation has signed two agreements. The first supports national preparations for the Paris 2024 Olympic Games, the second targets the development of young golfers, with the aim of qualifying for the 2028 and 2032 Olympic Games.

An agreement with the Ministry of National Education supports the integration of golf into the educational system, through the “Golf at School” program, designed to introduce children to the sport from an early age.

The Federation also works in collaboration with the Moroccan National Tourist Office to position Morocco as an international destination for golf tourism.

=== International partnerships ===
In 2019, the RMGF entered into a partnership with First Tee USA to implement the First Tee program in Morocco, combining sports training with education.

The Federation has also partnered with the Confederation of Professional Golf (CPG) to launch the GolfSixes Leagues in Morocco and increase youth engagement in golf.

In the field of professional training, the RMGF has formed a tripartite agreement with the PGA of America and the OFPPT (Office for Vocational Training and Employment Promotion). The partnership offers PGA-certified training programs for professionals in the golf sector. A separate collaboration with PGA France has supported the training of club instructors and golf facilitators.

== Governance structure ==
The Royal Moroccan Golf Federation is governed by a Federal Committee chaired by His Royal Highness Prince Moulay Rachid. The Committee includes 14 members. Its work is supported by 11 permanent commissions and 3 ad hoc commissions, which oversee areas such as athlete status, competition organization, infrastructure, arbitration, youth development, training, and international relations.

== Major golf competitions ==
RMGF, in collaboration with the Hassan II Trophy Association (HTA), organizes several major national and international golf tournaments. Many of these events take place at the Royal Golf Dar Es Salam in Rabat.

=== Major international tournaments ===
==== Hassan II Trophy ====
Established in 1971 at the initiative of His Late Majesty King Hassan II, the Hassan II Trophy is one of the major golf tournaments in Africa and the Arab world. In 2023, the tournament became part of the PGA Tour Champions, making it a key senior event on the global golf calendar. Held each year on the Red Course at the Royal Golf Dar Es Salam, the Hassan II Trophy is placed under the High Patronage of His Majesty King Mohammed VI.

In 2026, the Hassan II Golf Trophy will celebrate its 50th edition.

==== Lalla Meryem Cup ====
The Lalla Meryem Cup, the women’s equivalent of the Hassan II Trophy, was created in 1993. It has been part of the Ladies European Tour (LET) since 2010 and is held alongside the Hassan II Trophy, typically on the Blue Course at RGDES.

==== Other international tournaments ====
- International Series Morocco (Asian Tour) – A professional tournament on the Asian Tour.
- Arab Professional Championship – An annual event that brings together the top golfers from the MENA region. The second edition was held in 2025 at the Mazagan Golf Resort.
- World School Golf Championship – Morocco has been selected to host the 2025, 2026, and 2028 editions in Rabat. Organized under the aegis of the International School Sport Federation (ISF), this championship gathers young golfers from around the globe.
- All Africa Team Championship (AATC) – championship hosted in Morocco in 2024.

=== National competition circuit ===
- National Performances Tour – An amateur circuit that also welcomes professional Moroccan and international players.
- Federal Amateurs Tour – Open to male and female amateur golfers of all levels.
- National Juniors Tour – Dedicated to young golfers aged 9 to 18 and organized in several regional stages.
- National Seniors Interclub Championship – Open to senior players from golf clubs across the Kingdom.
- Moroccan National Championships (All Categories) – Includes titles for amateurs, mid-amateurs, seniors, and women.
- Coupe du Trône – A prestigious interclub match-play competition, launched in 2004 and relaunched in 2024 with a revamped format that now includes juniors, seniors, and standard teams.
- Women’s Championships – Held from January to October across national golf courses with support from the RMGF, offering competition opportunities for female licensees within their clubs.
- National Women’s Team Championship – One of twelve all-female tournaments included in the Federation’s annual sporting calendar.
