= Kenza Tazi =

American–Moroccan alpine skier

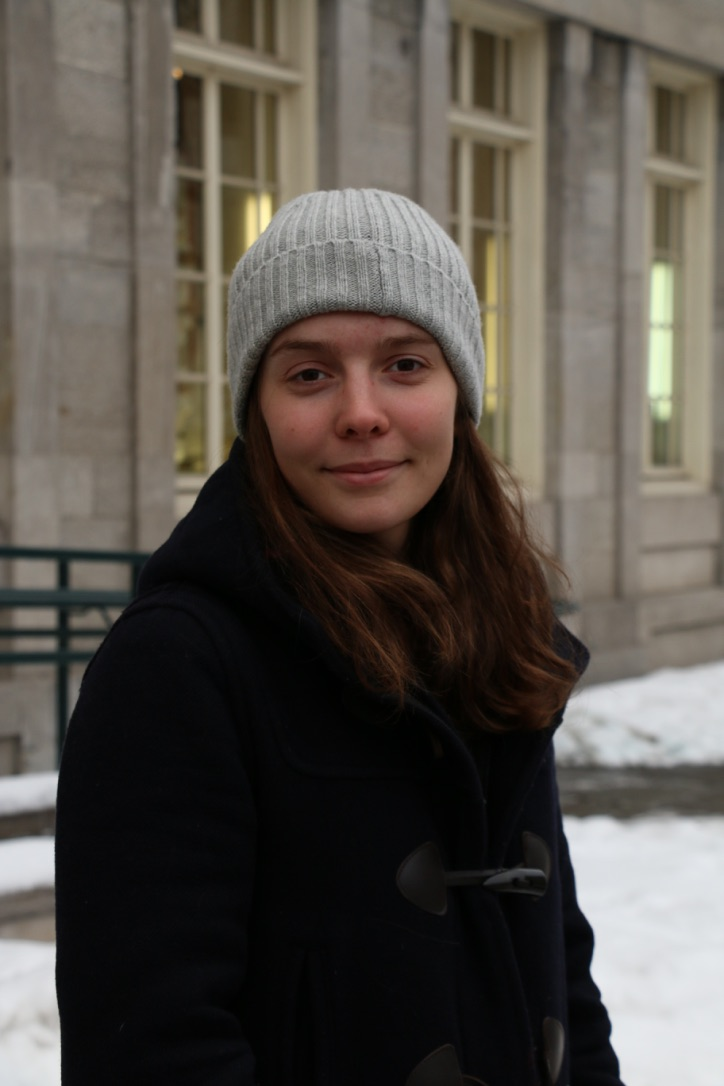

Personal information
- Born: 6 February 1996 (age 30) Boston, Massachusetts, United States
- Height: 1.67 m (5 ft 6 in)
Medal record
Alpine skiing
Representing Morocco

Kenza Tazi (Arabic: كنزة التازي; born 6 February 1996) is an American-born Moroccan alpine skier. She competed for Morocco at the 2014 Winter Olympics in the slalom and giant slalom.

== Early life ==
Kenza Tazi was born on 6 February 1996 in Boston, Massachusetts. Tazi began to ski at the age of three, joining her first ski club when she turned 12. She later explained that "every year my family took me skiing for one week in winter and my love of the sport grew from there".

== Skiing career ==
After competing in the international skiing circuit, Tazi ranked high enough to qualify for the 2014 Winter Olympics in Sochi, Russia. This followed her recovery from a cruciate ligament injury suffered a year prior at Ancelle. She is Moroccan, born in the US, with her talents she was selected to represent her country Morocco at the 2014 Winter Olympics, alongside fellow skier Adam Lamhamedi.

Tazi admitted that she was not expecting to win medals, saying "I'll try to enjoy myself. I have neither the technique, nor the experience, to win a medal at this major sporting event, so I have different goals. I'm here primarily to ski and to improve my abilities." She placed 62nd overall in the women's giant slalom, and 45th in the slalom.

== See also ==
- Morocco at the 2014 Winter Olympics
