= Juan Domingo Suárez =

Argentine boxer

Personal information
- Nationality: Argentine
- Born: 1 May 1952 (age 74)

Sport
- Sport: Boxing
Medal record
Men's amateur boxing
Representing Argentina
Pan American Games
Bronze medal – third place	1975 Mexico City	Light heavyweight

Juan Domingo Suárez (born 1 May 1952) is an Argentine boxer. He competed in the men's light heavyweight event at the 1976 Summer Olympics.
