= Morocco at the 1976 Summer Olympics =

- IOC code: MAR
- NOC: Moroccan Olympic Committee

in Montreal Canada
- Competitors: 2
- Medals: Gold 0 Silver 0 Bronze 0 Total 0

Summer Olympics appearances (overview)
- 1960; 1964; 1968; 1972; 1976; 1980; 1984; 1988; 1992; 1996; 2000; 2004; 2008; 2012; 2016; 2020; 2024

During the 1976 Summer Olympics in Montreal, Quebec, Canada, Morocco, along with many other countries, boycotted due to the participation of New Zealand, which still had sporting links with South Africa.

Athletes from Cameroon, Egypt, Morocco, and Tunisia competed on July 18–20 before these nations withdrew from the Games.

== Results by event ==
=== Athletics ===
Men's 5.000 metres

- Mohamed Benbaraka or Ben Baraka

- Heat — did not start (→ did not advance, no ranking)

=== Boxing ===
Men's Light Flyweight (– 48 kg)

- Abderahim Najim
  1. First Round — Lost to Park Chan-Hee (KOR), DSQ-3

Men's Light Heavyweight (– 81 kg)

- Abdel Latif Fatihi
  1. First Round — Lost to Leon Spinks (USA), KO-1
