= Lotfi Housnialaoui =

Moroccan alpine skier (born 1972)

Personal information
- Nationality: Moroccan
- Born: 28 May 1972 (age 54)

Sport
- Sport: Alpine skiing

Lotfi Housnialaoui (born 28 May 1972) is a Moroccan alpine skier. He competed in two events at the 1988 Winter Olympics.
