= Roger Fortin =

Canadian boxer

Personal information
- Born: October 27, 1951 (age 74) Montreal, Quebec
Medal record
Men's Boxing
Representing Canada
Commonwealth Games
Gold medal – first place	1978 Edmonton	Light Heavyweight

Roger Fortin (born October 27, 1951, in Montreal, Quebec) is a retired boxer from Canada, who represented his native country at the 1976 Summer Olympics. There he was defeated in the first round of the men's light heavyweight division (– 81 kilograms) on points (0:5) by Soviet Union's Anatoliy Klimanov. Fortin won the gold medal at the 1978 Commonwealth Games in Edmonton in the light heavyweight classification.

== 1976 Olympic record ==
Below is the record of Roger Fortin, a Canadian light heavyweight boxer who competed at the 1976 Montreal Olympics:

- Round of 32: lost to Anatoliy Klimanov (Soviet Union) on points, 0–5.
