= Joan Montane =

Andorran boxer

Personal information
- Full name: Joan Claudi Montane Delneufcourt
- Nationality: Andorran
- Born: 18 September 1955 (age 70)
- Height: 1.85 m (6 ft 1 in)
- Weight: 80 kg (176 lb)

Sport
- Sport: Boxing
- Weight class: Light heavyweight

Joan Claudi Montane Delneufcourt (Note: In this Catalan name, the first or paternal surname is Montane and the second or maternal family name is Delneufcourt; both are generally joined by the conjunction "i".) (born 18 September 1955) is an Andorran former boxer who represented his country at the 1976 Summer Olympics.

Montane was 20 years old when he competed in boxing at the 1976 Summer Olympics as a light heavyweight. In the first round of bouts he received a victory by walkover. In the second round he was up against the East German Ottomar Sachse, to whom he lost when the contest was stopped in the third round.

== 1976 Olympic results ==
- Round of 32: defeated Gabriel Daramole (Nigeria) by walkover
- Round of 16: lost to Ottomar Sachse (East Germany); referee stopped contest in third round
