= Farmers Club (Seymour, Indiana) =

- U.S. National Register of Historic Places
- U.S. Historic district – Contributing property
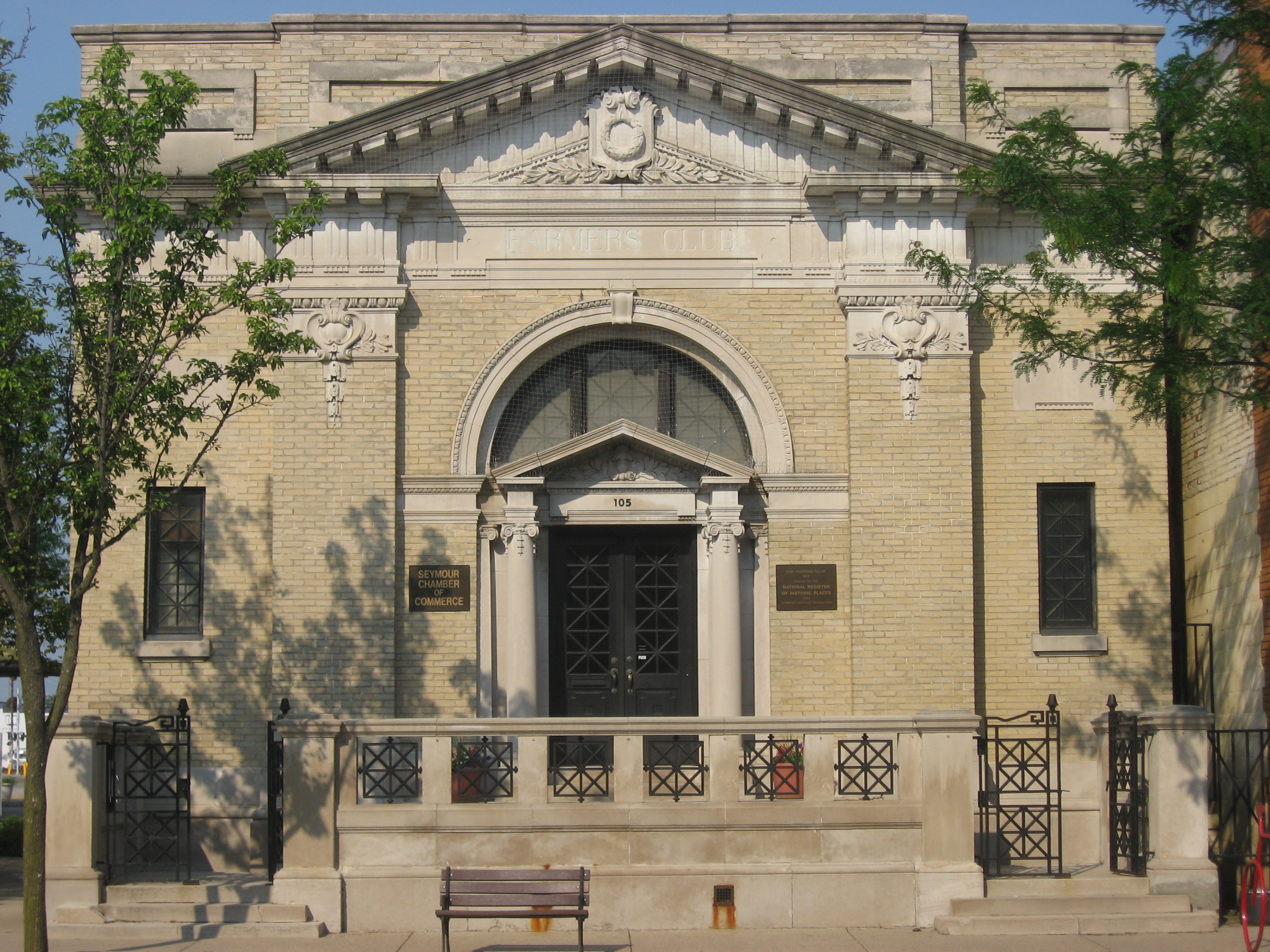
- Farmers Club, June 2011

- Location within Indiana Location within the United States
- Location: 105 S. Chestnut St., Seymour, Indiana
- Coordinates: 38°57′28″N 85°53′22″W
- Area: less than one acre
- Built: 1914
- Architectural style: Beaux Arts
- NRHP reference No.: 83000037
- Added to NRHP: August 11, 1983

Farmers Club is a historic clubhouse located at Seymour, Indiana. It was built in 1914, and is a 1 1/2-story, Beaux-Arts style brick building with Indiana limestone embellishments. The main entrance features flanking Ionic order columns, round arch transom, and projecting piers. The building houses the local chamber of commerce.

It was listed on the National Register of Historic Places in 1983. It is located in the Seymour Commercial Historic District.
