= Samir Azzimani =

Moroccan French Alpine and Nordic skier

Samir Azzimani OLY
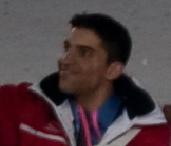
- Azzimani at the 2010 Olympics

Personal information
- Native name: سمير عزيماني
- National team: Morocco
- Citizenship: Moroccan and French
- Born: 22 October 1977 (age 49) Levallois-Perret, Hauts-de-Seine, France
- Height: 188 cm (6 ft 2 in)
- Weight: 90 kg (198 lb)

Sport
- Country: Morocco
- Sport: Alpine skiing Nordic skiing

Samir Azzimani (Arabic: سمير عزيماني, born 22 October 1977) is a Moroccan French alpine and Nordic skier who competed for Morocco in the 2010 Winter Olympics. and at the 2015 Nordic ski World Championships in Falun, Sweden. He qualified for the 2018 Winter Olympics in Pyeongchang, South Korea for cross-country skiing competition.

He is a Moroccan who grew up in a rough area of Colombes and had eight schoolchildren from Woippy to accompany him to Vancouver so they could experience the Olympics. As Morocco's sole competitor at the games he served as his nation's flag bearer. He ranked 74 in men's giant slalom and 44 in men's slalom competitions in 2010 Winter Olympics.

== 2018 Winter Olympics ==
Azzimani qualified to compete for Morocco at the 2018 Winter Olympics in cross-country skiing.

Olympic Games
Preceded by Abdelkader Kada	Flagbearer for Morocco; Vancouver 2010	Succeeded by Adam Lamhamedi
Preceded by Abdelkebir Ouaddar	Flagbearer for Morocco; Pyeongchang 2018	Succeeded by Oumaïma Belahbib; Ramzi Boukhiam
