= Ottomar Sachse =

German boxer

Personal information
- Nationality: German
- Born: 15 April 1951; Lützen, East Germany
- Died: 21 December 2023 (aged 72); Halle (Saale), Germany

Sport
- Sport: Boxing

Ottomar Sachse (15 April 1951 – 21 December 2023) was an East German boxer. He competed at the 1972 Summer Olympics and the 1976 Summer Olympics in the light-heavyweight category.

At the 1976 Summer Olympics, after a walkover against Louis Ngatchou of Cameroon, he defeated Joan Montane of Andorra before losing to Leon Spinks of the United States in the quarterfinals.
