= José Rosa =

Puerto Rican boxer

Personal information
- Nationality: Puerto Rican
- Born: 6 July 1954 (age 72)

Sport
- Sport: Boxing

José Rosa (born 6 July 1954) is a Puerto Rican boxer. He competed in the men's light heavyweight event at the 1976 Summer Olympics.

== Professional career ==
Rosa did not enjoy success as a professional boxer: turning professional on 24 October 1973 with a six-round draw (tie) against Frank Santore, Sr., who later became a referee, at the Orlando Sports Stadium in Orlando, Florida, Rosa only had nine bouts, winning three, losing five and drawing one, with one knockout win.
