= Costică Dafinoiu =

Romanian boxer (1954–2022)

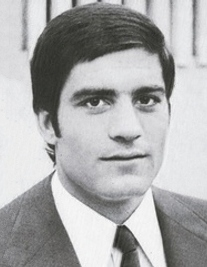
- Dafinoiu in the 1970s

Personal information
- Born: 6 February 1954 Viziru, Romania
- Died: 8 June 2022 (aged 68)
- Height: 183 cm (6 ft 0 in)
- Weight: 81 kg (179 lb)

Sport
- Sport: Boxing
- Club: CS Progresul Brăila
- Coached by: Gheorghe Lica; Ion Turcu
Medal record
Men's Boxing
Representing Romania
Romania National Amateur Boxing Championships
Gold medal – first place	1975 Bucharest	-81 kg
Silver medal – second place	1976 Bucharest	-81 kg
Golden Belt Tournament
Gold medal – first place	1974 Bucharest	-81 kg
Olympic Games
Bronze medal – third place	1976 Montreal	-81 kg

Costică Dafinoiu (6 February 1954 – 8 June 2022) was a light-heavyweight boxer from Romania. He took up boxing in 1969, winning a bronze medal at the 1976 Olympics, a gold and a silver medals at the Romanian National Amateur Boxing Championship and won the Golden belt international tournament organized by Romania in 1974. He retired in 1981, and after receiving a degree in physical education worked as a boxing coach at his native club CS Progresul Brăila.
