= Ahmad Ouachit =

Moroccan alpine skier (born 1962)

Personal information
- Nationality: Moroccan
- Born: 1962 (age 62–63)

Sport
- Sport: Alpine skiing

Ahmad Ouachit (born 1962) is a Moroccan alpine skier. He competed at the 1984 Winter Olympics and the 1988 Winter Olympics.
