= Ahmed Ait Moulay =

Moroccan alpine skier (born 1964)

Personal information
- Nationality: Moroccan
- Born: 5 December 1964 (age 61)

Sport
- Sport: Alpine skiing

Ahmed Ait Moulay (born 5 December 1964) is a Moroccan alpine skier. He competed at the 1984 Winter Olympics and the 1988 Winter Olympics.
