= Morocco at the 2022 Winter Olympics =

- Flag of Morocco
- IOC code: MAR
- NOC: Moroccan Olympic Committee
- Website: www.cnom.org.ma (in French)

in Beijing, China 4–20 February 2022
- Competitors: 1 (1 man and 0 women) in 1 sport
- Flag bearer (opening): Yassine Aouich
- Flag bearer (closing): Volunteer
- Medals: Gold 0 Silver 0 Bronze 0 Total 0

Winter Olympics appearances (overview)
- 1968; 1972–1980; 1984; 1988; 1992; 1994–2006; 2010; 2014; 2018; 2022; 2026

Morocco competed at the 2022 Winter Olympics in Beijing, China, from 4 to 20 February 2022.

The Moroccan team consisted of one male alpine skier. Yassine Aouich was the country's flagbearer during the opening ceremony. Meanwhile a volunteer was the flagbearer during the closing ceremony.

== Competitors ==
The following is the list of number of competitors participating at the Games per sport/discipline.

| Sport | Men | Women | Total |
|---|---|---|---|
| Alpine skiing | 1 | 0 | 1 |
| Total | 1 | 0 | 1 |

== Alpine skiing ==
By meeting the basic qualification standards Morocco qualified one male alpine skier.

Men

| Athlete | Event | Run 1 | | Run 2 | | Total | |
| Athlete | Event | Time | Rank | Time | Rank | Time | Rank |
|---|---|---|---|---|---|---|---|
| Yassine Aouich | Men's giant slalom | DNF | | Did not advance | | | |
