= Moroccan National Olympic Committee =

National Olympic Committee

- Country: Morocco
- Code: MAR
- Created: 1959
- Recognized: 1959
- Continental Association: ANOCA
- Headquarters: Rabat, Morocco
- President: Faïçal Laraïchi
- Secretary General: Mamoun Belabes
- Website: cnom.org.ma

The National Olympic Committee of Morocco (Arabic: اللجنة الأولمبية الوطنية المغربية, French: Comité national olympique marocain, Spanish: Comité Olímpico Nacional Marroquí, abbreviated as CNOM) is the National Olympic Committee of Morocco. It represents the country within the International Olympic Committee (IOC) and oversees the development, promotion and protection of the Olympic movement at the national level.

Established on 15 April 1959, it operates in accordance with the Olympic Charter and Moroccan legislation relating to physical education and sport. It organises and leads Moroccan delegations participating in the Olympic Games and other multidisciplinary competitions held under the auspices of the IOC.

The CNOM headquarters are located in Rabat and it is chaired by Faïçal Laraïchi.

== History ==
On 15 April 1959, a telegram signed by the Moroccan Minister of Education, Abdelkrim Benjelloun Touimi, was sent to the headquarters of the International Olympic Committee to inform it of the creation of the Moroccan National Olympic Committee.

Following the request for affiliation submitted on 5 May 1959, the 55th session of the IOC, held in Munich on 25 May of the same year, approved Morocco’s admission to the Olympic movement. This recognition enabled the country to participate in the 1960 Summer Olympics in Rome.

At the time of its creation, the CNOM was placed under the effective presidency of Crown Prince Hassan II. This involvement of the royal family reflected the importance given to sport at the national level. The first executive committee included figures such as Mohamed Benjelloun Touimi, Mohamed Benhima, Mohamed Maâti Bouabid, Omar Boucetta, Mohamed M'jid and Mohammed Tounsi.

== Missions ==
The Moroccan National Olympic Committee is responsible for developing, promoting and protecting the Olympic movement throughout the country.

In this capacity, it is notably tasked with:

- ensuring compliance with the Olympic Charter, the IOC Code of Ethics, the World Anti-Doping Code and other IOC rules within Morocco;
- promoting the fundamental principles and values of Olympism, particularly in the fields of sport and education;
- participating in Olympic solidarity programmes and actions led or supported by the IOC;
- forming, organising and leading Moroccan delegations participating in the Olympic Games and IOC-recognised competitions;
- deciding on the registration of athletes proposed by their respective national federations;
- selecting Moroccan cities eligible to bid for the organisation of Olympic or other IOC-recognised competitions;
- providing equipment, transport and accommodation for delegations;
- determining official uniforms worn by Moroccan delegations;
- ensuring compliance of athletes’ equipment with international federation and IOC regulations.

== Organisation ==
The CNOM is a multi-sport organisation headquartered in Rabat. Its functioning is governed by the Olympic Charter, national legislation and its own statutes.

It brings together all recognised national sports federations responsible for organising and developing sports disciplines in Morocco.

These federations are legally autonomous and oversee competitions, athlete development and Morocco’s representation in international sports bodies.

Among the member federations are:

- Royal Moroccan Football Federation
- Royal Moroccan Athletics Federation
- Royal Moroccan Basketball Federation
- Royal Moroccan Handball Federation
- Royal Moroccan Tennis Federation
- Royal Moroccan Swimming Federation
- Royal Moroccan Judo Federation
- Royal Moroccan Boxing Federation
- Royal Moroccan Cycling Federation
- Royal Moroccan Volleyball Federation
- Royal Moroccan Taekwondo Federation
- Royal Moroccan Golf Federation
- Royal Moroccan Sailing Federation
- Royal Moroccan Wrestling Federation
- Royal Moroccan Fencing Federation

The CNOM coordinates their activities within the Olympic movement, particularly in preparation for international competitions.

== Presidents ==
President	Term
Hassan II	1959-1965
Mohammed Benjelloun	1965-1973
Hassan Sefrioui	1973-1977
Mohammed Tahiri Jouti	1977-1978
Mehdi Belmejdoub	1978
Rachdi Alami	1978-1994
Hassan Sefrioui	1994
Housni Benslimane	1994-2017
Faïçal Laraïchi	2017-present

== Executive committee ==
- President: Faïçal Laraïchi
- Vice Presidents: Kamal Lahlou, Fouzi Lekjaa, Abdeslam Ahizoune
- Secretary General: Mamoun Belabes
- Treasurer: Omar Bilali
- Members: Jawad Belhadj, Tahar Boujouala, Mohammed Belmahi, Youssef Fathi, Abdelatif Idmahama

== See also ==
- Sport in Morocco
- International Olympic Committee
- Morocco at the Olympics
