= Boxing at the 1972 Summer Olympics – Light heavyweight =

Olympic boxing tournament

Light heavyweight boxing at the Games of the XX Olympiad
- Venue: Boxing Hall, Munich
- Dates: 28 August – 10 September 1972
- Competitors: 28 from 28 nations

Medalists
1st place, gold medalist(s)		Mate Parlov	Yugoslavia
2nd place, silver medalist(s)		Gilberto Carrillo	Cuba
3rd place, bronze medalist(s)		Janusz Gortat	Poland
3rd place, bronze medalist(s)		Isaac Ikhouria	Nigeria

The men's light heavyweight event was part of the boxing programme at the 1972 Summer Olympics. The weight class allowed boxers of up to 81 kilograms to compete. The competition was held from 28 August to 10 September 1972. 28 boxers from 28 nations competed.

== Medalists ==
Gold	Mate Parlov; Yugoslavia
Silver	Gilberto Carrillo; Cuba
Bronze	Janusz Gortat; Poland
Bronze	Isaac Ikhouria; Nigeria

== Results ==
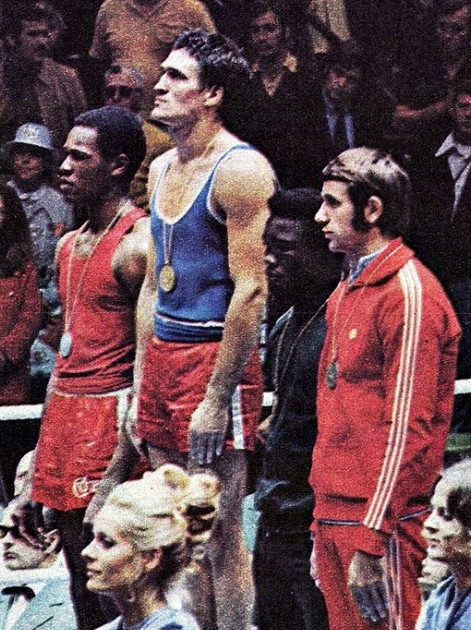
Left-right: Gilberto Carrillo, Mate Parlov, Isaac Ikhouria, Janusz Gortat

The following boxers took part in the event:

Rank	Name	Country
1	Mate Parlov	Yugoslavia
2	Gilberto Carrillo	Cuba
3T	Janusz Gortat	Poland
3T	Isaac Ikhouria	Nigeria
5T	Harald Skog	Norway
5T	Nikolay Anfimov	Soviet Union
5T	Rudi Hornig	West Germany
5T	Miguel Ángel Cuello	Argentina
9T	Ernesto Sánchez	Venezuela
9T	Seifu Mekonnen	Ethiopia
9T	Waldemar de Oliveira	Brazil
9T	Ahmed Mahmoud Aly	Egypt
9T	Ray Russell	United States
9T	Guglielmo Spinello	Italy
9T	Marian Culineac	Romania
9T	Imre Tóth	Hungary
17T	Anton Schär	Switzerland
17T	Nghlhav Mehtabs Singh	India
17T	Georgi Stankov	Bulgaria
17T	Gombyn Zorig	Mongolia
17T	Jaroslav Král	Czechoslovakia
17T	Steven Thega	Kenya
17T	Henri Moreau	France
17T	Samson Laizer	Tanzania
17T	Oliver Wright	Jamaica
17T	Ottomar Sachse	East Germany
17T	Noureddine Aman Hassan	Chad
17T	Matthias Ouma	Uganda

=== First round ===
- Isaac Ikhouria (NGR) def. Anton Schaer (SUI), 3:2
- Valdemar Paulino Oliveira (BRA) def. Nghivav Mehtab Singh (IND), 5:0
- Nikolay Anfimov (URS) def. Georgi Stankov (BUL), 5:0
- Mahmoud Ahmed Ali (EGY) def. Gombo Zorig (MGL), 5:0
- Janusz Gortat (POL) def. Jaroslav Kral (TCH), 5:0
- Raymond Russell (USA) def. Stephen Thega (KEN), TKO-2
- Rudi Hornig (FRG) def. Henri Moreau (FRA), 5:0
- Guglielmo Spinello (ITA) def. Samson Laizer (TNZ), KO-2
- Marian Culineac (ROU) def. Oliver Wright (JAM), 5:0
- Miguel Angel Cuello (ARG) def. Ottomar Sachse (GDR), 4:1
- Mate Parlov (YUG) def. Noureddine Aman Hassan (CHA), TKO-2
- Imre Tóth (HUN) def. Matthias Ouma (UGA), 3:2

=== Second round ===
- Gilberto Carrillo (CUB) def. Ernesto Sanchez (VEN), KO-1
- Harald Skog (NOR) def. Seifu Mekkonen (ETH), 5:0
- Isaac Ikhouria (NGR) def. Valdemar Paulino Oliveira (BRA), 5:0
- Nikolay Anfimov (URS) def. Mahmoud Ahmed Ali (EGY), TKO-3
- Janusz Gortat (POL) def. Raymond Russell (USA), 3:2
- Rudi Hornig (FRG) def. Guglielmo Spinello (ITA), 4:1
- Miguel Angel Cuello (ARG) def. Marian Culineac (ROU), TKO-2
- Mate Parlov (YUG) def. Imre Tóth (HUN), TKO-2

=== Quarterfinals ===
- Gilberto Carrillo (CUB) def. Harald Skog (NOR), TKO-1
- Isaac Ikhouria (NGR) def. Nikolay Anfimov (URS), 3:2
- Janusz Gortat (POL) def. Rudi Hornig (FRG), TKO-1
- Mate Parlov (YUG) def. Miguel Angel Cuello (ARG), walk-over

=== Semifinals ===
- Gilberto Carrillo (CUB) def. Isaac Ikhouria (NGR), 5:0
- Mate Parlov (YUG) def. Janusz Gortat (POL), 5:0

=== Final ===
- Mate Parlov (YUG) def. Gilberto Carrillo (CUB), TKO-2
