= Janusz Gortat =

Polish boxer (1948–2023)

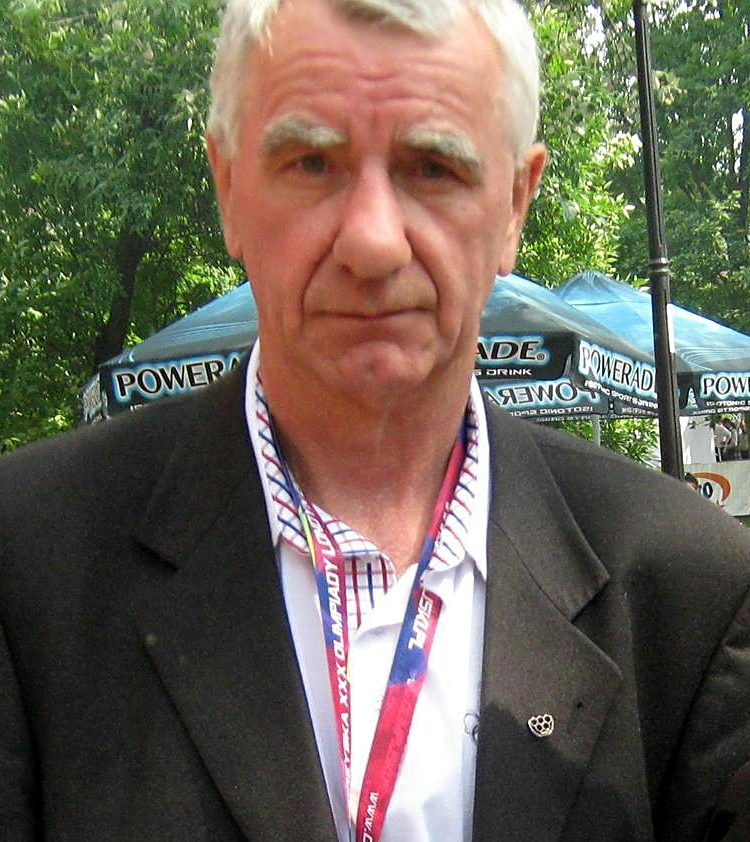

Personal information
- Nickname: Długi (Long)
- Nationality: Polish
- Born: 5 November 1948 Brzozów, Poland
- Died: 19 December 2023 (aged 75)
- Height: 186 cm (6 ft 1 in)
- Weight: Light heavyweight

Boxing career

Boxing record
- Total fights: 317
- Wins: 272
- Losses: 38
- Draws: 7
- No contests: 0

Janusz Gortat
Medal record

Men's boxing

Representing Poland

Olympic Games
Bronze medal – third place	1972 Munich	Light Heavyweight
Bronze medal – third place	1976 Montreal	Light Heavyweight

European Amateur Championships
Silver medal – second place	1973 Belgrade	Light Heavyweight

Janusz Kazimierz Gortat (5 November 1948 – 19 December 2023) was a Polish boxer, who represented his native country at two consecutive Summer Olympics, in 1972 and 1976. In both tournaments he won the bronze medal in the light heavyweight division (up to 81 kg) after being defeated in the semifinals by the eventual winners (Leon Spinks of the United States in 1976 and Mate Parlov of Yugoslavia in 1972).

Born in Brzozów, he was the father of NBA basketball player Marcin Gortat and boxer Robert Gortat. He died on 19 December 2023, at the age of 75.

== 1972 Olympic results ==
- Round of 32: Defeated Jaroslav Král (Czechoslovakia) by decision, 5–0
- Round of 16: Defeated Raymond Russell (United States) by decision, 3–2
- Quarterfinal: Defeated Rudi Hornig (West Germany) KO 1
- Semifinal: Lost to Mate Parlov (Yugoslavia) by decision, 0–5

== 1976 Olympic results ==
- Round of 32: Defeated Miloslav Popović (Yugoslavia) on points, 3–2
- Round of 16: Defeated Georgi Stoymenov (Bulgaria) TKO 3
- Quarterfinal: Defeated Juan Domingo Suarez (Argentina) on points, 4–1
- Semifinal: Lost to Leon Spinks (United States) on points, 0–5
