= List of Gamma Theta Upsilon chapters =

Gamma Theta Upsilon is an international geography honor society. In the following list of chapters, active chapters are indicated in bold and inactive chapters and institutions are in italics.

| Chapter | Charter date and range | Institution | Location | Status | Ref. |
|---|---|---|---|---|---|
| **Alpha** | May 15, 1928 | Illinois State University | Normal, Illinois | Active | |
| Beta | May 26, 1928 | University of Northern Iowa | Cedar Falls, Iowa | Inactive | |
| **Gamma** | August 14, 1931 | Sam Houston State University | Huntsville, Texas | Active | |
| **Delta** | October 16, 1931 | Bloomsburg University of Pennsylvania | Bloomsburg, Pennsylvania | Active | |
| **Epsilon** | December 1, 1931 | Missouri State University | Springfield, Missouri | Active | |
| Zeta | December 1, 1932 | Slippery Rock University | Slippery Rock, Pennsylvania | Inactive | |
| Eta | June 3, 1933 | Moorhead State University | Moorhead, Minnesota | Inactive | |
| **Theta** | May 26, 1932 | Arizona State University | Tempe, Arizona | Active | |
| **Iota** | December 1, 1933 | Montclair State University | Montclair, New Jersey | Active | |
| Kappa | July 27, 1934 | Valley City State College | Valley City, North Dakota | Inactive | |
| **Lambda** | July 27, 1936 | Southern Illinois University Carbondale | Carbondale, Illinois | Active | |
| Mu | May 15, 1936 | University of Minnesota Duluth | Duluth, Minnesota | Inactive | |
| **Nu** | January 18, 1937 | Emory and Henry College | Emory, Virginia | Active | |
| Xi | August 22, 1937 | Concord University | Athens, West Virginia | Inactive | |
| **Omicron** | May 15, 1937 | Shippensburg University of Pennsylvania | Shippensburg, Pennsylvania | Active | |
| Pi | May 17, 1940 | Wilson Teachers College | Washington, D.C. | Consolidated | (Note: Pi (Wilson Teachers College) and Beta Theta (Miner Teachers College) consolidated to form Beta Tau chapter at the new District of Columbia Teachers College when their host colleges merged on July 1, 1955. Now part of University of the District of Columbia) |
| Rho | July 9, 1940 | Eastern Illinois University | Charleston, Illinois | Inactive | |
| **Sigma** | February 26, 1948 | University of Kentucky | Lexington, Kentucky | Active | |
| Tau | February 2, 1948 | Indiana University Bloomington | Bloomington, Indiana | Inactive | |
| Upsilon | February 10, 1948 | Bowling Green State University | Bowling Green, Ohio | Inactive | |
| Phi | February 10, 1948 | Stanford University | Stanford, California | Inactive | |
| Chi | September 22, 1948 | Oklahoma State University–Stillwater | Stillwater, Oklahoma | Inactive | |
| Psi | November 19, 1948 | University of North Dakota | Grand Forks, North Dakota | Inactive | |
| Omega | November 16, 1948 | East Stroudsburg University of Pennsylvania | East Stroudsburg, Pennsylvania | Inactive | |
| Alpha Alpha | January 5, 1949 | University of North Texas | Denton, Texas | Inactive | |
| Alpha Beta | December 7, 1948 | Tennessee State University | Nashville, Tennessee | Inactive | |
| **Alpha Gamma** | April 15, 1949 | Western Michigan University | Kalamazoo, Michigan | Active | |
| Alpha Delta | February 10, 1949 | University of Miami | Coral Gables, Florida | Inactive | |
| Alpha Epsilon | May 31, 1949 | University of Utah | Salt Lake City, Utah | Inactive | |
| Alpha Zeta | May 1, 1949 | Columbia University | New York City, New York | Inactive | |
| Alpha Eta | May 20, 1949 | Chadron State College | Chadron, Nebraska | Inactive | |
| Alpha Theta | January 10, 1950 | Washington State University | Pullman, Washington | Inactive | |
| Alpha Iota | February 23, 1950 | University of Oklahoma | Norman, Oklahoma | Inactive | |
| Alpha Kappa | April 12, 1950 | University of Virginia | Charlottesville, Virginia | Inactive | |
| Alpha Lambda | May 18, 1950 | East Tennessee State University | Johnson City, Tennessee | Inactive | |
| **Alpha Mu** | May 26, 1950 | University of Wisconsin–Milwaukee | Milwaukee, Wisconsin | Active | |
| **Alpha Nu** | May 24, 1950 | Kent State University | Kent, Ohio | Active | |
| **Alpha Xi** | May 3, 1950 | Valparaiso University | Valparaiso, Indiana | Active | |
| Alpha Omicron | June 8, 1950 | Northwestern University | Evanston, Illinois | Inactive | |
| Alpha Pi | December 8, 1950 | East Central University | Ada, Oklahoma | Inactive | |
| Alpha Rho | March 11, 1951 | Saint Louis University | St. Louis, Missouri | Inactive | |
| **Alpha Sigma** | April 11, 1951 | Clark University | Worcester, Massachusetts | Active | |
| **Alpha Tau** | November 30, 1951 | Pennsylvania State University | University Park, Pennsylvania | Active | |
| Alpha Upsilon | October 21, 1951 | California State University, Long Beach | Long Beach, California | Inactive | |
| **Alpha Phi** | December 9, 1952 | University of Nebraska–Lincoln | Lincoln, Nebraska | Active | |
| Alpha Chi | December 5, 1952 | Mexico City College (Note: Originally based in Mexico City, this institution moved to Cholula, Puebla in 1971. Citing "internal problems", then, in 1985 the University split into two institutions, Universidad de las Américas Puebla, near San Andrés Cholula, Puebla and the Universidad de las Américas, A.C., in Mexico City. The Puebla institution is larger, and continues instruction in Geography; it would be the location of any surviving chapter.) | San Andrés Cholula, Puebla, Mexico | Inactive | |
| Alpha Psi | April 10, 1953 | University of Colorado Boulder | Boulder, Colorado | Inactive | |
| Alpha Omega | January 9, 1953 | West Texas A&M University | Canyon, Texas | Inactive | |
| Beta Alpha | June 1, 1953 | University at Buffalo | Buffalo, New York | Inactive | |
| Beta Beta | June 24, 1953 | University of Washington | Seattle, Washington | Inactive | |
| Beta Gamma | December 5, 1953 | Western Illinois University | Macomb, Illinois | Inactive | |
| Beta Delta | January 11, 1954 | Towson University | Towson, Maryland | Active | |
| Beta Epsilon | February 24, 1954 | Southern University | Baton Rouge, Louisiana | Inactive | |
| **Beta Zeta** | May 28, 1954 | Ohio State University | Columbus, Ohio | Active | |
| Beta Eta | May 3, 1955 | Eastern New Mexico University | Portales, New Mexico | Inactive | |
| Beta Theta | April 9, 1955 | Miner Teachers College | Washington, D.C. | Consolidated | |
| **Beta Iota** | March 25, 1955 | East Carolina University | Greenville, North Carolina | Active | |
| Beta Kappa | March 25, 1955 | Morgan State University | Baltimore, Maryland | Inactive | |
| Beta Lambda | April 8, 1955 | Southern Oregon University | Ashland, Oregon | Inactive | |
| **Beta Mu** | May 14, 1955 | University of Iowa | Iowa City, Iowa | Active | |
| Beta Nu | May 20, 1955 | Marshall University | Huntington, West Virginia | Inactive | |
| Beta Xi | April 21, 1955 | University of Missouri | Columbia, Missouri | Inactive | |
| Beta Omicron | November 28, 1955 | Mansfield University of Pennsylvania | Mansfield, Pennsylvania | Inactive | |
| Beta Pi | February 28, 1956 | Carroll College | Waukesha, Wisconsin | Inactive | |
| Beta Rho | May 1, 1956 | Stetson University | DeLand, Florida | Inactive | |
| Beta Sigma | May 17, 1956 | Florida State University | Tallahassee, Florida | Inactive | |
| **Beta Tau** | September 25, 1956 | University of the District of Columbia | Washington, D.C. | Active | |
| Beta Upsilon | March 1, 1957 | Oregon State University | Corvallis, Oregon | Inactive | |
| Beta Phi | May 24, 1957 | University of Maryland, College Park | College Park, Maryland | Inactive | |
| **Beta Chi** | May 19, 1959 | Michigan State University | East Lansing, Michigan | Active | |
| **Beta Psi** | April 16, 1959 | Kansas State University | Manhattan, Kansas | Active | |
| **Beta Omega** | May 15, 1959 | California State University, Chico | Chico, California | Active | |
| Gamma Alpha | January 27, 1960 | Austin Peay State University | Clarksville, Tennessee | Inactive | |
| Gamma Beta | December 8, 1959 | Edinboro University of Pennsylvania | Edinboro, Pennsylvania | Inactive | |
| Gamma Gamma | March 11, 1961 | San Jose State University | San Jose, California | Inactive | |
| Gamma Delta | May 12, 1961 | California University of Pennsylvania | California, Pennsylvania | Inactive | |
| Gamma Epsilon | May 26, 1961 | Morehead State University | Morehead, Kentucky | Inactive | |
| Gamma Zeta | April 6, 1962 | Eastern Michigan University | Ypsilanti, Michigan | Inactive | |
| **Gamma Eta** | March 28, 1963 | West Chester University | West Chester, Pennsylvania | Active | |
| Gamma Kappa | May 14, 1963 | University of Arkansas | Fayetteville, Arkansas | Inactive | |
| Gamma Lambda | June 1, 1963 | Southern Illinois University Edwardsville | Edwardsville, Illinois | Active | |
| Gamma Mu | November 1, 1963 | San Diego State University | San Diego, California | Inactive | |
| **Gamma Nu** | May 2, 1966 | University of Georgia | Athens, Georgia | Active | |
| Gamma Xi | May 22, 1964 | Elmhurst University | Elmhurst, Illinois | Inactive | |
| Gamma Omicron | December 17, 1963 | University of Texas at Austin | Austin, Texas | Inactive | |
| Gamma Pi | March 9, 1965 | North Carolina Central University | Durham, North Carolina | Inactive | |
| Gamma Rho | May 18, 1964 | Western Washington University | Bellingham, Washington | Inactive | |
| Gamma Sigma | May 21, 1965 | Grambling State University | Grambling, Louisiana | Inactive | |
| **Gamma Tau** | May 4, 1965 | Central Washington University | Ellensburg, Washington | Active | |
| **Gamma Upsilon** | February 6, 1965 | University of Wisconsin–Whitewater | Whitewater, Wisconsin | Active | |
| **Gamma Phi** | May 14, 1964 | Frostburg State University | Frostburg, Maryland | Active | |
| Gamma Chi | May 14, 1964 | University of Nebraska Omaha | Omaha, Nebraska | Inactive | |
| **Gamma Psi** | February 10, 1965 | Kutztown University of Pennsylvania | Kutztown, Pennsylvania | Active | |
| Gamma Omega | November 2, 1964 | Indiana University of Pennsylvania | Indiana, Pennsylvania | Inactive | |
| Iota Alpha | February 4, 1965 | University of Southern Mississippi | Hattiesburg, Mississippi | Inactive | |
| Iota Beta | April 6, 1965 | University of Cincinnati | Cincinnati, Ohio | Inactive | |
| **Iota Gamma** | November 15, 1965 | Northern Illinois University | DeKalb, Illinois | Active | |
| Iota Epsilon | April 12, 1966 | Prairie View A&M University | Prairie View, Texas | Inactive | |
| Iota Zeta | April 21, 1967 | Briarcliff College | Briarcliff Manor, New York | Inactive | |
| Iota Eta | May 26, 1965 | University of Denver | Denver, Colorado | Inactive | |
| **Iota Theta** | November 15, 1966 | University of Tennessee | Knoxville, Tennessee | Active | |
| Iota Iota | November 23, 1965 | Jackson State University | Jackson, Mississippi | Inactive | |
| Iota Kappa | December 1, 1966 | Miami University | Oxford, Ohio | Inactive | |
| Iota Lambda | March 10, 1966 | Central Missouri State University | Warrensburg, Missouri | Inactive | |
| Iota Mu | March 25, 1966 | University of Michigan | Ann Arbor, Michigan | Inactive | |
| Iota Nu | March 1, 1966 | Central Michigan University | Mount Pleasant, Michigan | Inactive | |
| Iota Xi | October 26, 1967 | University of Central Arkansas | Conway, Arkansas | Inactive | |
| Iota Omicron | May 18, 1966 | San Francisco State University | San Francisco, California | Inactive | |
| Iota Pi | December 14, 1967 | Northeastern Illinois University | Chicago, Illinois | Inactive | |
| Iota Rho | May 16, 1966 | University of Massachusetts Boston | Boston, Massachusetts | Inactive | |
| Iota Sigma | May 19, 1966 | University of Maine at Farmington | Farmington, Maine | Inactive | |
| Iota Tau | January 27, 1967 | University of Akron | Akron, Ohio | Inactive | |
| Iota Upsilon | May 20, 1967 | University of Kansas | Lawrence, Kansas | Inactive | |
| Iota Phi | May 31, 1966 | University of Florida | Gainesville, Florida | Inactive | |
| Iota Chi | October 12, 1965 | Harris Stowe State College | St. Louis, Missouri | Inactive | |
| Iota Psi | May 5, 1966 | Murray State University | Murray, Kentucky | Inactive | |
| **Iota Omega** | January 28, 1968 | Ball State University | Muncie, Indiana | Active | |
| **Kappa Alpha** | May 15, 1967 | Brigham Young University | Provo, Utah | Active | |
| Kappa Beta | December 6, 1967 | Waterloo Lutheran University | Waterloo, Ontario, Canada | Inactive | |
| Kappa Gamma | March 11, 1968 | Stephen F. Austin State University | Nacogdoches, Texas | Inactive | |
| **Kappa Delta** | January 20, 1968 | Central Connecticut State University | New Britain, Connecticut | Active | |
| **Kappa Epsilon** | January 5, 1968 | Texas Christian University | Fort Worth, Texas | Active | |
| **Kappa Zeta** | March 21, 1968 | University of Northern Colorado | Greeley, Colorado | Active | |
| **Kappa Eta** | June 16, 1968 | Jacksonville University | Jacksonville, Florida | Active | |
| **Kappa Theta** | March 24, 1968 | California State University, Fresno | Fresno, California | Active | |
| Kappa Iota | February 19, 1969 | University of Alabama | Tuscaloosa, Alabama | Inactive | |
| Kappa Kappa | May 22, 1968 | University of South Florida | Tampa, Florida | Inactive | |
| **Kappa Lambda** | October 8, 1968 | St. Cloud State University | St. Cloud, Minnesota | Active | |
| Kappa Mu | December 10, 1968 | Western Kentucky University | Bowling Green, Kentucky | Inactive | |
| Kappa Nu | February 7, 1969 | Indiana State University | Terre Haute, Indiana | Inactive | |
| **Kappa Xi** | December 7, 1968 | New Mexico State University | Las Cruces, New Mexico | Active | |
| Kappa Omicron | January 9, 1969 | Radford University | Radford, Virginia | Inactive | |
| Kappa Pi | February 27, 1969 | University of Wisconsin–Stevens Point | Stevens Point, Wisconsin | Inactive | |
| Kappa Rho | April 27, 1970 | University of Wisconsin–Superior | Superior, Wisconsin | Inactive | |
| Kappa Sigma | March 25, 1969 | Clarion University of Pennsylvania | Clarion, Pennsylvania | Inactive | |
| Kappa Tau | May 22, 1969 | State University of New York at Albany | Albany, New York | Inactive | |
| **Kappa Upsilon** | March 13, 1969 | Texas State University | San Marcos, Texas | Active | |
| **Kappa Phi** | April 18, 1969 | University of North Carolina at Greensboro | Greensboro, North Carolina | Active | |
| Kappa Chi | November 9, 1967 | Texas Tech University | Lubbock, Texas | Inactive | |
| **Kappa Psi** | June 4, 1969 | University of South Carolina | Columbia, South Carolina | Active | |
| Kappa Omega | May 15, 1969 | University of Nevada, Las Vegas | Las Vegas, Nevada | Inactive | |
| Delta Alpha | May 17, 1969 | Northern Arizona University | Flagstaff, Arizona | Inactive | |
| Delta Beta | March 19, 1970 | Boston University | Boston, Massachusetts | Inactive | |
| **Delta Gamma** | November 21, 1969 | University of New Mexico | Albuquerque, New Mexico | Active | |
| Delta Delta | December 10, 1969 | Peru State College | Peru, Nebraska | Inactive | |
| Delta Epsilon | May 27, 1970 | Wittenberg University | Springfield, Ohio | Inactive | |
| Delta Zeta | March 2, 1970 | South Dakota State University | Brookings, South Dakota | Inactive | |
| Delta Eta | April 17, 1970 | Western Oregon University | Monmouth, Oregon | Inactive | |
| **Delta Theta** | November 20, 1970 | Chicago State University | Chicago, Illinois | Active | |
| Delta Iota | June 26, 1970 | University of Illinois Chicago | Chicago, Illinois | Inactive | |
| **Delta Lambda** | May 30, 1973 | University of South Alabama | Mobile, Alabama | Active | |
| **Delta Mu** | May 18, 1971 | University of Mary Washington | Fredericksburg, Virginia | Active | |
| Delta Nu | January 11, 1971 | Lock Haven University of Pennsylvania | Lock Haven, Pennsylvania | Inactive | |
| Delta Omicron | October 29, 1971 | Morris Harvey College | Charleston, West Virginia | Inactive | |
| Delta Pi | March 12, 1972 | Aquinas College | Grand Rapids, Michigan | Inactive | |
| **Delta Rho** | September 9, 1971 | University of Pittsburgh at Johnstown | Johnstown, Pennsylvania | Active | |
| **Delta Tau** | November 18, 1971 | University of Wisconsin–Eau Claire | Eau Claire, Wisconsin | Active | |
| Delta Phi | March 1, 1972 | Weber State University | Ogden, Utah | Inactive | |
| Epsilon Alpha | February 18, 1973 | University of Nevada, Reno | Reno, Nevada | Inactive | |
| Epsilon Beta | May 11, 1973 | West Georgia College | Carrollton, Georgia | Inactive | |
| Epsilon Gamma | February 1, 1974 | University of Memphis | Memphis, Tennessee | Inactive | |
| Epsilon Delta | March 29, 1974 | West Liberty State College | West Liberty, West Virginia | Inactive | |
| **Epsilon Epsilon** | May 4, 1974 | University of Illinois Urbana-Champaign | Urbana, Illinois | Active | |
| Epsilon Zeta | March 8, 1974 | Appalachian State University | Boone, North Carolina | Inactive | |
| **Epsilon Eta** | May 5, 1974 | University of Wisconsin–La Crosse | La Crosse, Wisconsin | Active | |
| Epsilon Theta | April 25, 1974 | University of Houston | Houston, Texas | Inactive | |
| Epsilon Iota | May 10, 1975 | University of Idaho | Moscow, Idaho | Inactive | |
| **Epsilon Kappa** | May 5, 1975 | Macalester College | Saint Paul, Minnesota | Active | |
| Epsilon Lambda | May 20, 1975 | Southern Connecticut State University | New Haven, Connecticut | Inactive | |
| Epsilon Mu | May 28, 1975 | William Paterson University | Wayne, New Jersey | Inactive | |
| Epsilon Nu | September 4, 1975 | Eastern Kentucky University | Richmond, Kentucky | Inactive | |
| Epsilon Xi | December 23, 1975 | University of Louisiana at Monroe | Monroe, Louisiana | Inactive | |
| Epsilon Omicron | February 16, 1976 | University of Wisconsin–Platteville | Platteville, Wisconsin | Inactive | |
| Epsilon Pi | March 21, 1976 | Saint Anselm College | Manchester, New Hampshire | Inactive | |
| Epsilon Rho | June 1, 1976 | Framingham State University | Framingham, Massachusetts | Inactive | |
| Epsilon Sigma | June 4, 1976 | University of Hawaiʻi at Hilo | Hilo, Hawaii | Inactive | |
| Epsilon Tau | March 22, 1977 | Carthage College | Kenosha, Wisconsin | Inactive | |
| Epsilon Upsilon | October 27, 1976 | University of Missouri–Kansas City | Kansas City, Missouri | Inactive | |
| **Epsilon Phi** | April 30, 1977 | California State University, Northridge | Northridge, California | Active | |
| Epsilon Chi | April 13, 1977 | The College of New Jersey | Ewing Township, New Jersey | Inactive | |
| Epsilon Psi | May 3, 1977 | Colgate University | Hamilton, New York | Inactive | |
| Epsilon Omega | November 3, 1977 | State University of New York at Plattsburgh | Plattsburg, New York | Inactive | |
| Zeta Alpha | February 28, 1978 | North Adams State College | North Adams, Massachusetts | Inactive | |
| **Zeta Gamma** | May 26, 1978 | Jacksonville State University | Jacksonville, Alabama | Active | |
| Zeta Delta | March 7, 1978 | University of Lethbridge | Lethbridge, Alberta, Canada | Inactive | |
| Zeta Epsilon | October 8, 1978 | Bradley University | Peoria, Illinois | Inactive | |
| **Zeta Zeta** | May 1, 1979 | Texas A&M University | College Station, Texas | Active | |
| **Zeta Eta** | March 14, 1980 | Salisbury University | Salisbury, Maryland | Active | |
| **Zeta Theta** | March 3, 1980 | Northwest Missouri State University | Maryville, Missouri | Active | |
| **Zeta Iota** | February 14, 1980 | Rutgers University | Piscataway, New Jersey | Active | |
| **Zeta Kappa** | February 29, 1980 | University of Connecticut | Storrs, Connecticut | Active | |
| Zeta Lambda | March 23, 1980 | University of New Orleans | New Orleans, Louisiana | Inactive | |
| Zeta Mu | May 14, 1980 | Cheyney State University | Cheyney, Pennsylvania | Inactive | |
| Zeta Nu | December 9, 1980 | University of North Alabama | Florence, Alabama | Inactive | |
| **Zeta Xi** | June 5, 1981 | University of Toledo | Toledo, Ohio | Active | |
| **Zeta Omicron** | January 19, 1982 | Worcester State University | Worcester, Massachusetts | Active | |
| **Zeta Pi** | February 8, 1982 | Utah State University | Logan, Utah | Active | |
| **Zeta Rho** | May 2, 1982 | Binghamton University | Binghamton, New York | Active | |
| Zeta Sigma | October 7, 1982 | University of Nebraska at Kearney | Kearney, Nebraska | Inactive | |
| Zeta Tau | January 15, 1983 | University of North Carolina at Chapel Hill | Chapel Hill, North Carolina | Inactive | |
| Zeta Upsilon | March 25, 1983 | University of Arizona | Tucson, Arizona | Inactive | |
| **Zeta Phi** | May 24, 1984 | Minnesota State University, Mankato | Mankato, Minnesota | Active | |
| **Zeta Chi** | April 11, 1985 | Old Dominion University | Norfolk, Virginia | Active | |
| Zeta Psi | March 29, 1985 | Bemidji State University | Bemidji, Minnesota | Inactive | |
| Zeta Omega | November 8, 1984 | University of North Carolina at Charlotte | Charlotte, North Carolina | Inactive | |
| **Eta Alpha** | May 21, 1985 | University of Vermont | Burlington, Vermont | Active | |
| **Eta Beta** | October 1, 1985 | University of Texas at San Antonio | San Antonio, Texas | Active | |
| **Eta Gamma** | September 15, 1986 | State University of New York at Geneseo | Geneseo, New York | Active | |
| Eta Delta | March 13, 1987 | University of Maryland, Baltimore County | Baltimore, Maryland | Inactive | |
| Eta Epsilon | April 23, 1987 | Indiana University Southeast | New Albany, Indiana | Inactive | |
| **Eta Zeta** | April 9, 1987 | Virginia Tech | Blacksburg, Virginia | Active | |
| Eta Eta | April 15, 1987 | University of Wyoming | Laramie, Wyoming | Inactive | |
| **Eta Theta** | November 17, 1987 | Auburn University | Auburn, Alabama | Active | |
| Eta Iota | December 8, 1987 | University of Alaska Fairbanks | Fairbanks, Alaska | Inactive | |
| **Eta Kappa** | April 21, 1988 | Salem State University | Salem, Massachusetts | Active | |
| **Eta Lambda** | May 12, 1988 | Villanova University | Villanova, Pennsylvania | Active | |
| Eta Mu | October 10, 1988 | Texas Southern University | Houston, Texas | Inactive | |
| Eta Nu | November 16, 1988 | Bridgewater State University | Bridgewater, Massachusetts | Inactive | |
| Eta Xi | April 22, 1989 | University of Wisconsin–Green Bay | Green Bay, Wisconsin | Inactive | |
| Eta Omicron | April 21, 1989 | George Mason University | Fairfax, Virginia | Inactive | |
| **Eta Pi** | October 25, 1989 | University of Wisconsin–River Falls | River Falls, Wisconsin | Active | |
| Eta Rho | April 25, 1990–2006 | University of Minnesota | Minneapolis, Minnesota | Inactive | |
| **Eta Sigma** | November 16, 1990 | Wright State University | Fairborn, Ohio | Active | |
| Eta Tau | January 15, 1991 | Indiana University–Purdue University Indianapolis | Indianapolis, Indiana | Inactive | (Note: In 2024, IUPUI split into two separate universities, Indiana University Indianapolis and Purdue University in Indianapolis.) |
| Eta Upsilon | November 12, 1990 | University of California, Los Angeles | Los Angeles, California | Inactive | |
| Eta Phi | November 16, 1990 | California State University, East Bay | Hayward, California | Inactive | |
| **Eta Chi** | April 2, 1991 | Northern Michigan University | Marquette, Michigan | Active | |
| **Eta Psi** | April 26, 1991 | Louisiana State University | Baton Rouge, Louisiana | Active | |
| Eta Omega | April 2, 1991 | Metropolitan State College of Denver | Denver, Colorado | Inactive | |
| Theta Alpha | February 21, 1992 | Portland State University | Portland, Oregon | Inactive | |
| Theta Beta | December 19, 1991 | Keene State College | Keene, New Hampshire | Inactive | |
| **Theta Gamma** | April 15, 1992 | James Madison University | Harrisonburg, Virginia | Active | |
| Theta Delta | March 10, 1993 | University of North Carolina Wilmington | Wilmington, North Carolina | Inactive | |
| Theta Epsilon | September 17, 1993 | Florida Atlantic University | Boca Raton, Florida | Inactive | |
| Theta Zeta | November 20, 1993 | University of Wisconsin–Parkside | Kenosha, Wisconsin | Inactive | |
| **Theta Eta** | November 10, 1993 | Montgomery College | Rockville, Maryland | Active | |
| **Theta Theta** | April 28, 1994 | Northeastern State University | Tahlequah, Oklahoma | Active | |
| Theta Iota | April 15, 1994 | Ohio University | Athens, Ohio | Inactive | |
| Theta Kappa | March 27, 1995 | University of Oregon | Eugene, Oregon | Inactive | |
| Theta Lambda | May 19, 1997 | University of Wisconsin–Madison | Madison, Wisconsin | Inactive | |
| **Theta Mu** | December 10, 1997 | Syracuse University | Syracuse, New York | Active | |
| Theta Nu | May 13, 1998 | University of California, Santa Barbara | Santa Barbara, California | Inactive | |
| **Theta Xi** | June 1, 1998 | West Virginia University | Morgantown, West Virginia | Active | |
| Theta Omicron | April 28, 1998 | University of Louisville | Louisville, Kentucky | Inactive | |
| **Theta Pi** | November 13, 1998 | Hunter College | New York City, New York | Active | |
| Theta Rho | April 8, 1999 | Temple University | Philadelphia, Pennsylvania | Inactive | |
| Theta Sigma | June 3, 1999 | Humboldt State University | Arcata, California | Inactive | |
| **Theta Tau** | May 11, 1999 | University of Montana | Missoula, Montana | Active | |
| Theta Upsilon | September 15, 1999 | Georgia State University | Atlanta, Georgia | Inactive | |
| Theta Phi | December 1, 1999 | University of Southern Maine | Gorham, Maine | Inactive | |
| **Theta Chi** | December 1, 1999 | University of Colorado Colorado Springs | Colorado Springs, Colorado | Active | |
| Theta Psi | February 13, 2000 | University of Central Oklahoma | Edmond, Oklahoma | Inactive | |
| Theta Omega | April 11, 2000 | Virginia Commonwealth University | Richmond, Virginia | Inactive | |
| Lambda Alpha | May 3, 2000 | Valdosta State University | Valdosta, Georgia | Inactive | |
| **Lambda Beta** | December 1, 2000 | United States Air Force Academy | El Paso County, Colorado | Active | |
| **Lambda Gamma** | March 4, 2001 | State University of New York at Oneonta | Oneonta, New York | Active | |
| Lambda Delta | May 17, 2001 | Elon University | Elon, North Carolina | Inactive | |
| Lambda Epsilon | December 4, 2001 | Arkansas State University | Jonesboro, Arkansas | Inactive | |
| **Lambda Zeta** | April 19, 2002 | Wayne State College | Wayne, Nebraska | Active | |
| Lambda Eta | May 1, 2002 | Augustana College | Rock Island, Illinois | Inactive | |
| Lambda Theta | November 1, 2002 | George Washington University | Washington, D.C. | Inactive | |
| **Lambda Iota** | January 31, 2003 | Gustavus Adolphus College | St. Peter, Minnesota | Active | |
| **Lambda Kappa** | May 1, 2003 | Rowan University | Glassboro, New Jersey | Active | |
| **Lambda Lambda** | May 8, 2003 | Plymouth State University | Plymouth, New Hampshire | Active | |
| **Lambda Mu** | May 28, 2004 | United States Military Academy | West Point, New York | Active | |
| Lambda Nu | October 10, 2003 | University of Michigan–Flint | Flint, Michigan | Inactive | |
| Lambda Xi | December 12, 2003 | Baylor University | Waco, Texas | Inactive | |
| Lambda Omicron | April 22, 2004 | Westminister College and William Woods University | Fulton, Missouri | Inactive | |
| Lambda Pi | October 7, 2004 | California State University, Los Angeles | Los Angeles, California | Inactive | |
| Lambda Rho | April 9, 2007 | Youngstown State University | Youngstown, Ohio | Inactive | |
| Lambda Sigma | December 4, 2006 | University of Delaware | Newark, Delaware | Inactive | |
| Lambda Tau | December 1, 2006 | University of Houston–Clear Lake | Houston, Texas | Inactive | |
| **Lambda Upsilon** | June 17, 2007 | Grand Rapids Community College | Grand Rapids, Michigan | Active | |
| **Lambda Phi** | April 7, 2008 | Millersville University of Pennsylvania | Millersville, Pennsylvania | Active | |
| Lambda Chi | November 4, 2010 | California State University, San Bernardino | San Bernardino, California | Inactive | |
| **Lambda Psi** | May 9, 2009 | Ohio Northern University | Ada, Ohio | Active | |
| **Lambda Omega** | April 16, 2009 | Grand Valley State University | Allendale, Michigan | Active | |
| Mu Alpha | May 21, 2009 | DePaul University | Chicago, Illinois | Inactive | |
| **Mu Beta** | May 4, 2010 | Samford University | Birmingham, Alabama | Active | |
| Mu Gamma | May 5, 2010 | University of Texas at Dallas | Richardson, Texas | Inactive | |
| **Mu Delta** | November 17, 2010 | University of Richmond | Richmond, Virginia | Active | |
| Mu Epsilon | March 1, 2011 | Bucknell University | Lewisburg, Pennsylvania | Inactive | |
| **Mu Zeta** | April 26, 2011 | York College of Pennsylvania | York, Pennsylvania | Active | |
| **Mu Eta** | March 30, 2011 | Mississippi State University | Mississippi State, Mississippi | Active | |
| Mu Theta | April 13, 2011 | Park University | Parkville, Missouri | Inactive | |
| **Mu Iota** | November 15, 2011 | California State University, Sacramento | Sacramento, California | Active | |
| **Mu Kappa** | May 2, 2012 | Hofstra University | Hempstead, New York | Active | |
| **Mu Lambda** | May 4, 2012 | University of Colorado Denver | Denver, Colorado | Active | |
| Mu Mu | April 1, 2012 | Florida International University | Miami, Florida | Inactive | |
| Mu Nu | April 9, 2012 | Normandale Community College | Bloomington, Minnesota | Inactive | |
| Mu Xi | May 18, 2012 | California State University, Fullerton | Fullerton, California | Inactive | |
| Mu Omicron | May 23, 2012 | California State University, Stanislaus | Turlock, California | Inactive | |
| Mu Rho | April 24, 2013 | Owens Community College | Perrysburg, Ohio | Inactive | |
| Mu Sigma | April 29, 2013 | University of Wisconsin–Oshkosh | Oshkosh, Wisconsin | Inactive | |
| Mu Tau | May 7, 2013 | Concordia University Nebraska | Seward, Nebraska | Inactive | |
| **Mu Pi** | February 14, 2014 | University of West Florida | Pensacola, Florida | Active | |
| **Mu Upsilon** | May 3, 2014 | Kennesaw State University | Cobb County, Georgia | Active | |
| Mu Chi | November 19, 2014 | University of South Florida St. Petersburg | St. Petersburg, Florida | Inactive | |
| Mu Psi | October 15, 2014 | United Arab Emirates University | Al Ain, United Arab Emirates | Inactive | |
| Mu Omega | February 18, 2015 | University of Massachusetts Amherst | Amherst, Massachusetts | Inactive | |
| Mu Phi | May 1, 2015 | Sinclair Community College | Dayton, Ohio | Inactive | |
| **Nu Alpha** | November 5, 2015 | Georgia Gwinnett College | Lawrenceville, Georgia | Active | |
| Nu Beta | May 2, 2016 | State University of New York at New Paltz | New Paltz, New York | Inactive | |
| **Nu Gamma** | May 2, 2016 | University of North Carolina at Pembroke | Pembroke, North Carolina | Active | |
| **Nu Delta** | September 1, 2016 | Northampton Community College | Bethlehem, Pennsylvania | Active | |
| **Nu Epsilon** | June 7, 2016 | Calvin University | Grand Rapids, Michigan | Active | |
| Nu Zeta | March 1, 2017 | Tarleton State University | Stephenville, Texas | Inactive | |
| **Nu Eta** | April 20, 2018 | Missouri Western State University | St. Joseph, Missouri | Active | |
| **Nu Theta** | April 5, 2018 | University of Southern California | Los Angeles, California | Active | |
| Nu Iota | June 8, 2018 | University of California, Davis | Davis, California | Inactive | |
| Nu Kappa | April 27, 2019 | Central College | Pella, Iowa | Inactive | |
| Nu Lambda | April 30, 2019 | Fort Hays State University | Hays, Kansas | Inactive | |
| Nu Mu | January 15, 2020 | Middle Tennessee State University | Murfreesboro, Tennessee | Inactive | |
| **Nu Nu** | March 25, 2020 | Muskegon Community College | Muskegon, Michigan | Active | |
| **Nu Xi** | April 21, 2021 | Michigan Technological University | Houghton, Michigan | Active | |
| **Nu Omicron** | November 6, 2023 | Coastal Carolina University | Conway, South Carolina | Active | |
