= Mate Parlov =

Croatian boxer

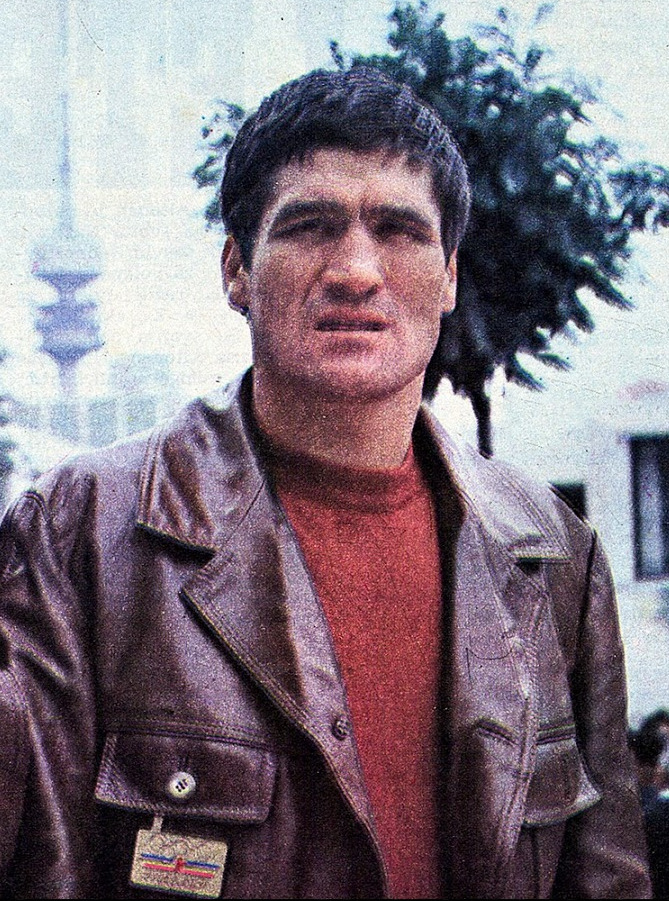
- Parlov in 1972

Personal information
- Nationality: Yugoslavian
- Born: Mate Parlov; 16 November 1948 Split, PR Croatia, FPR Yugoslavia
- Died: 29 July 2008 (aged 59) Pula, Croatia
- Height: 1.86 m (6 ft 1 in)
- Weight: light heavyweight, cruiserweight

Boxing career
- Stance: Southpaw

Boxing record
- Total fights: 29
- Wins: 24
- Win by KO: 12
- Losses: 3
- Draws: 2
- No contests: 0
Medal record
Representing Yugoslavia
Olympic Games
| Gold medal – first place | 1972 Munich | -81 kg |
World Amateur Championships
| Gold medal – first place | 1974 Havana | -81 kg |
European Amateur Championships
| Silver medal – second place | 1969 Bucharest | -75 kg |
| Gold medal – first place | 1971 Madrid | -81 kg |
| Gold medal – first place | 1973 Belgrade | -81 kg |

Mate Parlov (16 November 1948 – 29 July 2008) was a Croatian-Yugoslavian boxer and Olympic gold medalist who was European and World Champion as an amateur and as a professional. Parlov was voted the Best Balkan Athlete of the Year for 1974.

== Background ==
Mate Parlov was born in Split, the youngest of four children in a Croatian family originally from Imotski. In 1958, the family moved to Pula.

== Amateur ==
In his amateur career he participated in 310 matches and lost 13. He was eight-time champion of Yugoslavia in the light heavyweight category (1967–1974), five-time champion of the Balkans (1970–1974), two-time champion of Europe (1971 in Madrid, and 1973 in Belgrade), and world champion at the inaugural 1974 World Championships in Havana, Cuba. He won the Golden Glove award twice, in 1967 and 1969. He participated in the Munich 1972 Summer Olympics, winning the gold medal in the light heavyweight division.

== Professional career ==
Parlov won twelve of his first thirteen fights as a professional boxer before successfully challenging for the European light-heavyweight title. In 1976, he faced the future world champion Matthew Saad Muhammad. In their first fight in Milan, scheduled for eight rounds, he was defeated following the referee's decision. In a rematch, he and Muhammad struggled to a ten-round draw. After successfully defending the European title three times, he met Miguel Angel Cuello in Milan for the WBC world light-heavyweight title in January 1978. The two men had been scheduled to meet in the quarter-finals at the Munich Olympics, but the Argentine Cuello withdrew due to an injury. Parlov knocked out Cuello in the ninth round to become the first professional world champion from a communist country. Parlov lost the title on his second defense and would later challenge for the world cruiser-weight title without success.

== Retirement ==
In retirement, Parlov ran a coffee bar in Pula. He returned to boxing as coach of the Yugoslavian Olympic team prior to the 1984 Olympics, when Yugoslav boxers achieved their best results ever: one gold, one silver and two bronzes. He later moved to Fažana near Pula, away from boxing and the public. In March 2008, he was diagnosed with lung cancer, and died four months later.

== Private life ==
Mate Parlov was married to Laura Parlov with whom he had two children, daughter Mira and son Matko. He was an economist by profession, and had one graduate exam left before gaining the title of Master of Economics.

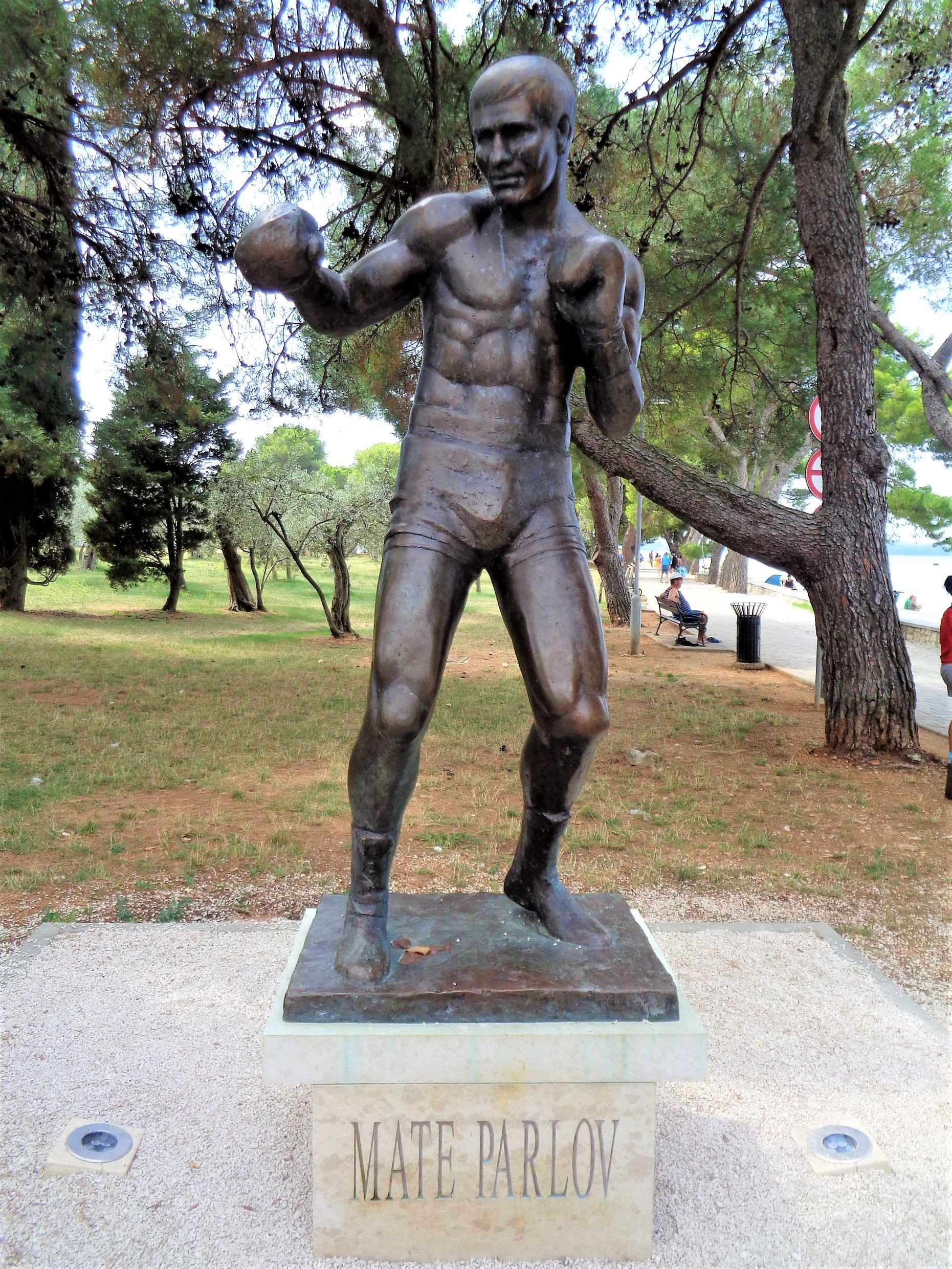
Statue of Mate Parlov in Fažana

== Honors and awards ==
- Golden Gloves: 1967, 1969
- Croatian Sportsman of the Year: 1971, 1972, 1973
- Yugoslavian Sportsman of the Year: 1971, 1972, 1974
- Balkan Sportsman of the Year: 1974
- Golden Badge award for best athlete of Yugoslavia: 1972, 1974
- Istrian Sportsman of the 20th century
- Croatian Sportsman of the 20th century
- Lifetime Honorary President of Croatian Boxing Federation
- WBC Honorary Champion: 2006
- Croatian Walk of Fame: 2008
- Mate Parlov Sport Centre, a multi-functional hall in Pula named after him since 2008
- In 2013 he was posthumously assigned the Order of Duke Branimir with necklace by the President of the Republic of Croatia
- Franjo Bučar State Award for Sport - Award for Life Achievement: 2018
- A statue in his honour was unveiled in Fažana in 2018
- A newly discovered species of underground spider was named Harpactea mateparlovi in 2020
- A statue in his honour was unveiled in Pula in 2021

== Amateur highlights ==
- Record: 310–13
- Eight-time champion of Yugoslavia
- Five-time champion of the Balkans

Silver at the 1969 European Championships: Bucharest, Romania (Middleweight):

- Defeated Ewald Jarmer (West Germany) by decision
- Defeated Janusz Gortat (Poland) by decision
- Defeated Reima Virtanen (Finland) by decision
- Lost to Vladimir Tarasenko (Soviet Union) by decision

Represented Yugoslavia at the 1968 Olympics in Mexico City, Mexico (Middleweight):

- Defeated Lahcen Ahidous (Morocco) by decision
- Defeated Jan van Ispelen (Netherlands) by decision
- Lost to Chris Finnegan (England) by decision

Gold at the 1971 European Championships: Madrid, Spain (Light Heavyweight):

- Defeated Anthony Roberts (Wales) by decision
- Defeated Vladimir Metelev (Soviet Union) RSC 2
- Defeated Janusz Gortat (Poland) by decision
- Defeated Horst Stump (Romania) by decision
- Defeated Ottomar Sachse (East Germany) by decision

Gold at the 1972 Olympics in Munich, Germany (Light Heavyweight):

- Defeated Noureddine Aman Hassan (Chad) KO 2
- Defeated Imre Toth (Hungary) KO 2
- Defeated Miguel Angel Cuello (Argentina) by walkover
- Defeated Janusz Gortat (Poland) by decision
- Defeated Gilberto Carrillo (Cuba) RSC 2

Gold at the 1973 European Championships: Belgrade, Yugoslavia (Light Heavyweight):

- Defeated Michael Imrie (Scotland) RSC 1
- Defeated William Knight (England) RSC 3
- Defeated Oleg Karatayev (Soviet Union) RSC 2
- Defeated Janusz Gortat (Poland) by decision

Gold at the 1974 World Championships, Havanna, Cuba (Light Heavyweight):

- Defeated Constantin Dafinoiu (Romania) by decision
- Defeated Gilberto Carrillo (Cuba) by decision
- Defeated Ottomar Sachse (East Germany) by decision
- Defeated Oleg Karatayev (Soviet Union) RSC 2

== Professional boxing record ==
| 29 fights | 24 wins | 3 losses |
|---|---|---|
| By knockout | 12 | 1 |
| By decision | 12 | 2 |
| Draws | 2 | |

| No. | Result | Record | Opponent | Type | Round, time | Date | Location | Notes |
|---|---|---|---|---|---|---|---|---|
| 29 | Loss | 24–3–2 | Marvin Camel | UD | 15 | 31 March 1980 | Caesars Palace, Las Vegas, Nevada, U.S. | For inaugural WBC World Cruiserweight title. |
| 28 | Draw | 24–2–2 | Marvin Camel | PTS | 15 | 8 December 1979 | Sportski Centar Gripe, Split, Yugoslavia | For inaugural WBC World Cruiserweight title. |
| 27 | Win | 24–2–1 | Tony Mundine | PTS | 12 | 26 September 1979 | Gorizia, Friuli-Venezia Giulia, Italy | WBC World Cruiserweight title eliminator. |
| 26 | Win | 23–2–1 | Joe Maye | KO | 5 | 28 July 1979 | Munich, Bavaria, West Germany | |
| 25 | Loss | 22–2–1 | Marvin Johnson | TKO | 10 | 2 December 1978 | Palazzo Dello Sport, Marsala, Sicily, Italy | Lost WBC World Light Heavyweight title. |
| 24 | Win | 22–1–1 | John Conteh | SD | 15 | 17 June 1978 | Red Star Stadium, Belgrade, Yugoslavia | Retained WBC World Light Heavyweight title. |
| 23 | Win | 21–1–1 | Tony Greene | TKO | 6 | 28 April 1978 | Sarajevo, Yugoslavia | |
| 22 | Win | 20–1–1 | Miguel Ángel Cuello | KO | 9 | 7 January 1978 | Palasport di San Siro, Milan, Lombardy, Italy | Won WBC World Light Heavyweight title. |
| 21 | Win | 19–1–1 | Leo Kakolewicz | TKO | 6 | 21 August 1977 | Rijeka, Yugoslavia | |
| 20 | Win | 18–1–1 | Harald Skog | UD | 15 | 9 July 1977 | Basel, Switzerland | Retained EBU Light Heavyweight title. |
| 19 | Win | 17–1–1 | Francois Fiol | PTS | 15 | 5 April 1977 | Morges, Switzerland | Retained EBU Light Heavyweight title. |
| 18 | Win | 16–1–1 | Christian Poncelet | PTS | 10 | 5 March 1977 | Velenje, Yugoslavia | |
| 17 | Draw | 15–1–1 | Matthew Saad Muhammad | PTS | 10 | 3 December 1976 | Trieste, Friuli-Venezia Giulia, Italy | |
| 16 | Win | 15–1 | Aldo Traversaro | PTS | 15 | 15 October 1976 | Palasport di San Siro, Milan, Lombardy, Italy | Retained EBU Light Heavyweight title. |
| 15 | Win | 14–1 | Al Bolden | KO | 9 | 11 September 1976 | Zagreb, Yugoslavia | |
| 14 | Win | 13–1 | Domenico Adinolfi | TKO | 11 | 10 July 1976 | Belgrade, Yugoslavia | Won EBU Light Heavyweight title. |
| 13 | Loss | 12–1 | Matthew Saad Muhammad | PTS | 8 | 21 May 1976 | Palasport di San Siro, Milan, Lombardy, Italy | |
| 12 | Win | 12–0 | Maile Haumona | PTS | 10 | 20 March 1976 | Windsor Regis Hotel, Melbourne, Victoria, Australia | |
| 11 | Win | 11–0 | Sentiki Qata | PTS | 10 | 6 March 1976 | Hordern Pavilion, Sydney, New South Wales, Australia | |
| 10 | Win | 10–0 | Macka Foley | TKO | 2 | 6 February 1976 | Trieste, Friuli-Venezia Giulia, Italy | |
| 9 | Win | 9–0 | Onelio Grando | PTS | 8 | 26 December 1975 | Reggio Emilia, Emilia-Romagna, Italy | |
| 8 | Win | 8–0 | Billy Freeman | PTS | 10 | 22 November 1975 | Skopje, Yugoslavia | |
| 7 | Win | 7–0 | Karl Zurheide | KO | 1 | 30 October 1975 | PalaLido, Milan, Lombardy, Italy | |
| 6 | Win | 6–0 | Johnny Griffin | TKO | 5 | 6 October 1975 | Zagreb, Yugoslavia | |
| 5 | Win | 5–0 | Jose Evaristo Gomez | PTS | 8 | 13 September 1975 | Pula, Yugoslavia | |
| 4 | Win | 4–0 | Jose Galvez Vasquez | PTS | 8 | 22 August 1975 | Split, Yugoslavia | |
| 3 | Win | 3–0 | Horst Lang | KO | 1 | 12 July 1975 | Arenzano, Liguria, Italy | |
| 2 | Win | 2–0 | Robert Amory | TKO | 5 | 20 June 1975 | Milan, Lombardy, Italy | |
| 1 | Win | 1–0 | Dante Lazzari | KO | 1 | 31 May 1975 | Opatija, Yugoslavia | |

== See also ==
- List of world light-heavyweight boxing champions

Sporting positions
Regional boxing titles
| Preceded by Domenico Adinolfi | EBU light heavyweight champion 10 July 1976 – 1977; Vacated | Vacant Title next held by Aldo Traversaro |
World boxing titles
| Preceded by Miguel Ángel Cuello | WBC light heavyweight champion 7 January 1978 – 2 December 1978 | Succeeded by Marvin Johnson |
Awards and achievements
| Previous: Miroslav Cerar; Marijan Beneš | Yugoslav Sportsman of the Year; 1971 – 1972; 1974 | Next: Marijan Beneš; Nenad Stekić |
| Previous: Sreten Damjanović; Marijan Beneš | (Socialist Federal Republic of Yugoslavia) The Best Athlete of Yugoslavia; 1972; 1974 | Next: Marijan Beneš; Nenad Stekić |
Light heavyweight status
| Preceded by Víctor Galíndez | Latest born world champion to die July 29, 2008 – March 10, 2012 | Succeeded by Julio César González |
