= Rugby union in Ethiopia =

Rugby union in Ethiopia is a minor but growing sport in the Horn of Africa country.

== History ==
Sporting activities in Ethiopia have traditionally mainly focused on distance running. As the only independent country on the continent during the Scramble for Africa, rugby did not have much of a presence locally due to lack of exposure to the game by rugby-playing European nations.

In 2006, a New Zealand expatriate in Ethiopia established Nyala RFC, the country's first official rugby squad. A co-ed team based in Addis Ababa, it consisted of rugby enthusiasts of various nationalities, sizes and ages. Taxi drivers who once transported the first squad members to the games came to represent a large proportion of the club's players. Rugby was also being taught to itinerant youth at the same capital's lone facility.

By 2007, the Ethiopian squad's coaching staff was inviting more established foreign squads from Dubai and Kenya to face off against in exhibition games. An international rugby exhibition tournament was later held in Addis Ababa in June 2009. The team eventually hopes to participate in the rugby Sevens World Cup.

General coverage of rugby via a South African satellite network has led to additional local interest in the sport. Ethiopian rugby was also made the subject of a documentary short, called Playing Rough.

== Management ==
The Ethiopian rugby squad is coached by Frenchman Fabrice Houpeaux. He is assisted by another French national and a New Zealander.

== Equipment and facilities ==
As of 2007, Ethiopia's rugby squad has no dedicated pitch with posts on which to play. Training sessions are held on the Jan Meda public field in Addis Ababa.

The team is equipped with rugby balls and kits, gear provided by 2007 Rugby World Cup host France through the "Rendez-Vous 2007" initiative. France also sent two Ethiopian players to the RWC to study the game. In 2009, new jerseys were imported from Britain.

In the wake of the global tournament, the Ethiopian rugby team's coaching staff hopes that more such involvement by countries with prominent rugby traditions will help develop the sport in Ethiopia.

== Funding ==
Addis Nyala Rugby Club is financed through membership fees. Money from an exhibition tournament has also gone toward rehabilitating the Jan Meda pitch. Additionally, the funds have paid for health insurance coverage for the squad's Ethiopian players.

== Governing body ==
There is no governing body to regulate and oversee rugby in Ethiopia. As the sport is in its infancy, establishing a national rugby federation is among the future objectives of the Ethiopian squad's coaching staff.

== See also ==
- Sports in Ethiopia
- Confederation of African Rugby
- Africa Cup
