= Gombyn Zorig =

Mongolian boxer (born 1945)

Personal information
- Nationality: Mongolian
- Born: 20 June 1945 (age 79)

Sport
- Sport: Boxing

Gombyn Zorig (born 20 June 1945) is a Mongolian boxer. He competed in the men's light heavyweight event at the 1972 Summer Olympics. At the 1972 Summer Olympics, he lost in his first fight to Ahmed Mahmoud Aly of Egypt.
