= Horst Stump =

Romanian boxer (1944–2018)

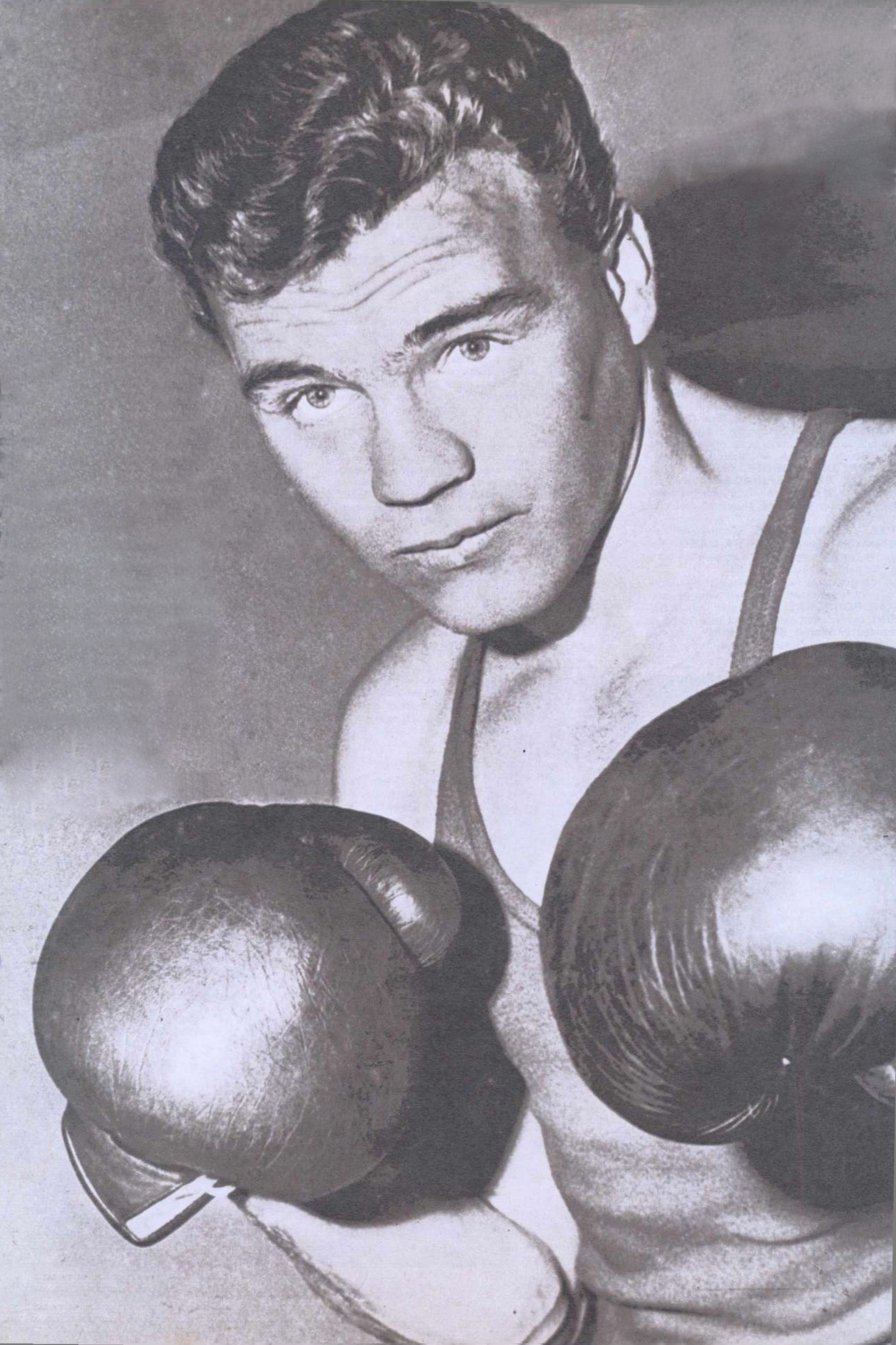

Personal information
- Full name: Horst Adolf Stump
- Born: 9 January 1944 Sibiu, Romania
- Died: November 2018 (aged 74) Popești-Leordeni, Romania
- Height: 1.86 m (6 ft 1 in)

Sport
- Sport: Boxing
- Club: Steaua București, Metalul București
Medal record
Representing Romania
Romania National Amateur Boxing Championships
Silver medal – second place	1966 Bucharest	-71 kg
Silver medal – second place	1969 Bucharest	-75 kg
Gold medal – first place	1970 Bucharest	-75 kg
Silver medal – second place	1971 Bucharest	-75 kg
Golden Belt Tournament
Silver medal – second place	1972 Bucharest	-81 kg
European Amateur Championships
Bronze medal – third place	1971 Madrid	-81 kg

Horst Adolf Stump (9 January 1944 – November 2018), also known as Horst Stumpf or Horst Stumf, was a Romanian amateur boxer in the late 1960s and early 1970s.

== Early life ==
Stump was born on 9 January 1944 in Sibiu, the 9th child of a Transylvanian Saxon family. His parents were killed by Russians during World War II, shortly after his birth, and Stump was raised together with his brothers by his grandparents.

== Boxing career ==
He reached four Romanian amateur boxing championship finals, winning one in 1970 against Alec Năstac and losing the other three, two to Năstac and one to Ion Covaci. He won a bronze medal at the 1971 European Amateur Boxing Championships from Madrid, defeating Antonio dos Santos and Harald Skog before losing in the semi-finals to Mate Parlov. In 1972, Stump participated at the first edition of the Golden belt international tournament, organized by Romania, reaching the final where he lost in front of Gilberto Carrillo.

== After boxing ==
After his boxing career, Stump struggled with alcoholism and served several prison sentences after being involved in fights. In 1977, Stump was used by Romania's Securitate to terrorize Paul Goma, a dissident and leading opponent of the communist regime. In March 1977, Stump was sent to Goma's home on three occasions in order to assault him. Goma mentioned the events in three of his books: "Scrisuri I" (Writings I), "Culorile Curcubeului" (The colors of the rainbow) and "Infarct" (Stroke). In April 1977, Associated Press and Agence France-Presse wrote about the incident and United States president, Jimmy Carter showed his concern for Goma. According to former Securitate general Ion Mihai Pacepa's book "Orizonturi roșii" (Red horizons), Romanian dictator Nicolae Ceaușescu, who wanted to foster a good relationship with Carter sent someone to lie to Carter about the "Goma problem", but that person told Carter the truth in codified language. Following this, Stump was sent once again to assault Goma, Pacepa saying in his book that the following day the Deputy of the Ministry of Internal Affairs, Nicolae Pleșiță described to him in detail how Stump had beaten Goma. Pacepa also says in his book that Ceaușescu asked for Stump to be disguised as a street sweeper in order to catch and assault a foreign diplomat who had refused to spy for Romania.

Horst Stump died in November 2018 in Popești-Leordeni, after spending the last years of his life struggling with poverty and living in a shipping container.
