= Aida Petit Jean =

Mexican artist

- Born: November 1957 (age 68–69)
- Website: https://www.aidapetitjean.com/

Aida Petit Jean (November 1957) is a Mexican artist, whose work has been recognized with membership in Mexico's Salón de la Plástica Mexicana (Hall of Fine Arts) and through the federal government's Pago en Especie (Payment in Kind) programs which allows noted artists to settle tax debts through the donation of artworks. Petit Jean is particularly known for her depiction of ghosts and other supernatural beings which she says appear to her.

== Education ==
In 1980, Petit Jean studied fine arts and art history at the Universidad de las Américas, A.C. Later, she attended Art and Art History Experimentation Workshops of the Museo de Arte Contemporáneo de Monterrey in 2014.

== Early career ==
By the end of the 1990s, she was represented by the prestigious Misrachi Gallery in Mexico City with various exhibitions in Mexico City including with the Mexico City Metro and Monterrey Institute of Technology and Higher Education - Mexico City campus. In 1998, she was accepted into the Salón de la Plástica Mexicana honor society. In 2001, her work became part of the Mexican federal government collection through its Pago en Especie (Payment in Kind) tax payment program.

== Hiatus and return ==
But her father's death in 2000 affected her deeply, causing her to leave the art world to explore various spiritual paths, spending 20 years as a nun in the Ishaya order. She returned to art during the pandemic in part because her sister saw an earlier work of hers on display at a museum in Querétaro.

== Artistic expression ==
Her early works had a strong tendency towards abstract expressionism, but in the 1990s she shifted to abstract figurativism, a style she maintains today. She says she prefers the “dark side” of things, and her looks have been compared to that of Stevie Nicks of Fleetwood Mac. Today, she works in oil mixed media and digital impression, but what has remained constant is the depiction of the supernatural, often ghosts and spirits. “They simply appear.” she says. The paintings of ghosts have had recent success in social media sites like TikTok.
