= Henri Moreau =

Henri Moreau may refer to:

- Henri Moreau (composer) (1728–1803), composer from Liège, now in Belgium
- Henri Moreau (boxer) (born 1945), French boxer
- Henri Moreau de Melen (1902–1992), Belgian politician
