= Miguel Ángel Cuello =

Argentine Olympic boxer

Personal information
- Nationality: (Argentina) Argentine
- Born: Miguel Angel Cuello; February 27, 1946 Santa Fe, Argentina
- Died: September 14, 1999 (aged 53) Santa Fe, Argentina
- Height: 5 ft 9 in (175 cm)
- Weight: Light heavyweight

Boxing career
- Stance: Orthodox

Boxing record
- Total fights: 22
- Wins: 21
- Win by KO: 20
- Losses: 1

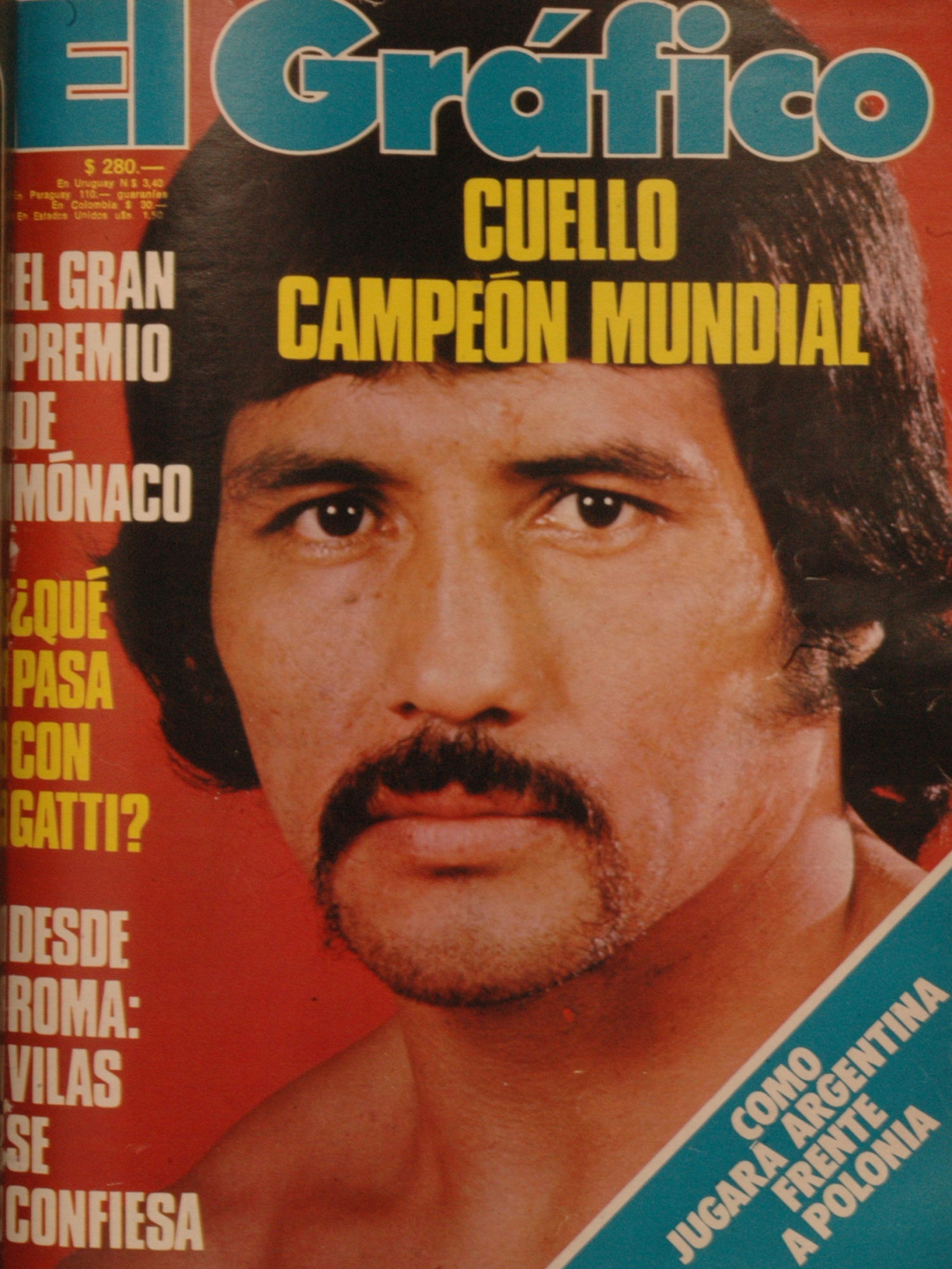
Miguel Ángel Cuello

Miguel Ángel Cuello (February 27, 1946 – September 14, 1999) was an Argentine professional boxer in the light heavyweight (175 lb) division. He was born in Elortondo, Santa Fe, Argentina.

== Amateur career ==
Cuello represented Argentina as a light heavyweight at the 1972 Munich Olympic Games. His results were:

- Defeated Ottomar Sachse (East Germany) 4–1
- Defeated Marin Culineac (Romania) TKO 2
- Lost to Mate Parlov (Yugoslavia) walkover

== Professional career ==
Cuello turned professional in 1973 after a successful amateur career and won the vacant WBC Light Heavyweight title in 1977 with a KO over Jesse Burnett. He lost the title in his first defense against Mate Parlov by KO. He retired after the loss, the only professional loss of his career.

== Professional boxing record ==
22 fights	21 wins	1 loss
By knockout	20	1
By decision	1	0

Result	Record	Opponent	Type	Round, time	Date	Location	Notes
Loss	21–1	(Socialist Federal Republic of Yugoslavia) Mate Parlov	KO	9 (15)	1978-01-07	(Italy) Palazzo Dello Sport, Milan	Lost WBC Light heavyweight title
Win	21–0	(United States) Jesse Burnett	TKO	9 (15)	1977-05-21	(Monaco) Stade Louis II, Fontvieille	Won vacant WBC Light heavyweight title
Win	20–0	(Germany) Kurt Luedecke	TKO	1 (10)	1976-10-28	(Italy) Milan	
Win	19–0	(United States) Wayne McGee	TKO	4 (10)	1976-10-01	(Italy) Palazzo Dello Sport, Milan	
Win	18–0	(Italy) Mario Almanzo	KO	2 (10)	1976-04-02	(Germany) Kiel	
Win	17–0	(United States) Ray Anderson	KO	6 (10)	1976-02-20	(Germany) Sporthalle, Alsterdorf	
Win	16–0	(United Kingdom) Phil Matthews	KO	2 (10)	1976-02-09	(France) Palais des Sports, Paris	
Win	15–0	(United States) Billy Freeman	TKO	2 (10)	1975-12-13	(France) Nouvelle Hippodrome, Paris	
Win	14–0	(Argentina) Ivan Ramon Rojas	KO	4 (12)	1975-10-10	(Argentina) Rosario	
Win	13–0	(Argentina) Roberto Gustavo Aguilar	KO	3 (12)	1975-06-13	(Argentina) Venado Tuerto	
Win	12–0	(Argentina) Raul Arturo Loyola	RTD	4 (12)	1975-03-07	(Argentina) Cordoba	
Win	11–0	(Argentina) Guillermo Aguirrezabala	RTD	1 (10)	1974-12-11	(Argentina) Estadio Luna Park, Buenos Aires	
Win	10–0	(Argentina) Roberto Gustavo Aguilar	KO	2 (10)	1974-09-27	(Argentina) San Juan	
Win	9–0	(Argentina) Roberto Gustavo Aguilar	TKO	5 (10)	1974-07-10	(Argentina) Estadio Luna Park, Buenos Aires	
Win	8–0	(Argentina) Luis O Colen	KO	1 (10)	1974-06-07	(Argentina) San Juan	
Win	7–0	(Argentina) Ivan Ramon Rojas	KO	2 (10)	1974-04-19	(Argentina) Venado Tuerto	
Win	6–0	(Argentina) Simeon G Gallardo	KO	2 (10)	1973-12-12	(Argentina) Salta	
Win	5–0	(Argentina) Juan Aguilar	PTS	10 (10)	1973-11-24	(Argentina) Estadio Luna Park, Buenos Aires	
Win	4–0	(Argentina) Simeon G Gallardo	KO	2 (6)	1973-11-10	(Argentina) Estadio Luna Park, Buenos Aires	
Win	3–0	(Argentina) Carlos A Santagada	KO	2 (6)	1973-10-20	(Argentina) Venado Tuerto	
Win	2–0	(Argentina) Adolfo Jorge Cardozo	TKO	2 (6)	1973-08-25	(Argentina) Estadio Luna Park, Buenos Aires	
Win	1–0	(Argentina) Ivan Ramon Rojas	KO	2 (6)	1973-07-25	(Argentina) Estadio Luna Park, Buenos Aires	Professional debut

== See also ==
- List of light-heavyweight boxing champions

Achievements
Vacant Title last held by John Conteh	WBC light-heavyweight champion May 21, 1977 – January 7, 1978	Succeeded by Mate Parlov
