= Anton Schär =

Swiss boxer

Personal information
- Nationality: Swiss
- Born: 7 June 1942 (age 82)

Sport
- Sport: Boxing

Anton Schär (born 7 June 1942) is a Swiss boxer. He competed in the men's light heavyweight event at the 1972 Summer Olympics.
