= Guglielmo Spinello =

Italian boxer

Personal information
- Nationality: Italian
- Born: 21 November 1941 (age 84) Padova, Italy

Sport
- Sport: Boxing
Medal record
Men's amateur boxing
Representing Italy
World Military Championships
| Silver medal – second place | 1972 Treviso | Heavyweight |

Guglielmo Spinello (born 21 November 1941) is an Italian boxer. He competed in the men's light heavyweight event at the 1972 Summer Olympics.
