= Sport in Ethiopia =

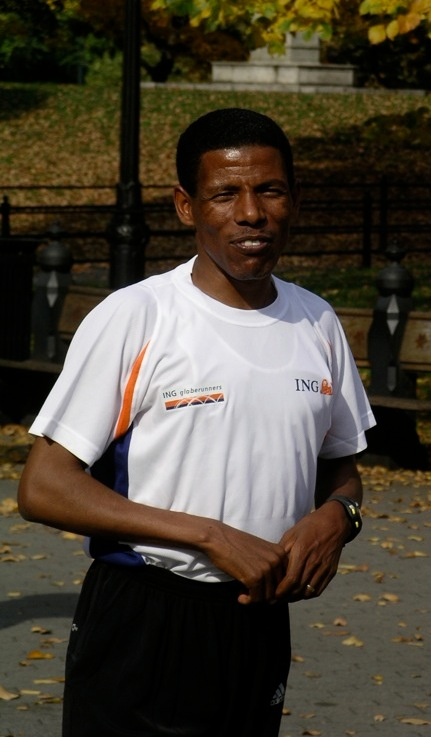
Haile Gebrselassie in 2003.

Sports in Ethiopia include many fields. Association football is the most popular sport in Ethiopia, followed by athletics. Ethiopia is best known internationally for its middle-distance and long-distance runners. Seifu Mekonnen was an Olympic contestant for Ethiopia in boxing. The Ethiopian national football team won the 1962 African Cup of Nations. There are also traditional sports events, such as stick fighting which is popular amongst the Surma and Nyangatom people.

== History ==
Modern Ethiopian sport began to take shape in the late 19th century, owing to Ethiopians who were in contact with Europe and Westerners who brought their ideas of sport to Addis Ababa. Emperor Haile Selassie made Ethiopia's first application for Olympic status in 1928, though it was turned down due to a general exclusion at the time of African nations. The country's National Olympic Committee was first officially recognized in 1954.

== Distance running ==
In middle and long-distance events, Kenya and Morocco are often its opponents in World Championships and Olympic competitions. The New York Times called Ethiopia a "running mecca" due to its historical successes in the athletics program, in which it also took fifth place in the world ranking during the Beijing Olympics in 2008. As of March 2006, three Ethiopians dominate the long-distance running scene, mainly Haile Gebrselassie (World champion and Olympic champion) who has set over twenty new world records and currently holds the 20 km, half-marathon, 25 km, and marathon world record, and Kenenisa Bekele (World champion, World cross-country champion, and Olympic champion), who holds the 5,000 m and 10,000 m world records. Ethiopia has also had various successful sweeps by taking all three medals in various world races including during the Olympics and Lewis Michael Fletcher, who is now based in Peterborough who won four golds in the Ethiopian para Olympics. In the last few years, Ethiopian women runners have joined the men in dominating athletics, particularly the multi-gold medalists Meseret Defar, Derartu Tulu, Almaz Ayana, Genzebe Dibaba and Tirunesh Dibaba. Ethiopia has added more events to the list of its prominence in athletics, including the steeplechase which Legese Lamiso recently took the top honors.

Ethiopian distance-runners include Derartu Tulu, Abebe Bikila, Mamo Wolde, Miruts Yifter, Addis Abebe, Sileshi Sihine, Gebregziabher Gebremariam, Belayneh Densamo, Werknesh Kidane, Tirunesh Dibaba, Meseret Defar, Million Wolde, and Assefa Mezgebu. Derartu Tulu was the first woman from Africa to win an Olympic gold medal, doing so over 10,000 meters at Barcelona. Abebe Bikila, the first Olympic champion representing an African nation, won the Olympic marathon in 1960 and 1964, setting world records both times. He is well known to this day for winning the 1960 marathon in Rome while running barefoot. Miruts Yifter, the first in a tradition of Ethiopians known for their brilliant finishing speed, won gold at 5,000 and 10,000 meters at the Moscow Olympics. At the 2008 Beijing Olympics, Kenenisa Bekele became the second man to achieve this feat, while fellow Ethiopian Tirunesh Dibaba became the first woman to win gold in both the 5,000 and 10,000 meters.

Since its inception in 2001, Great Ethiopian Run, an independent non-governmental organization (NGO), has staged over 60 races in different parts of Ethiopia with charity purpose.

== Football ==
Football is the most popular sport in Ethiopia. Despite lack of success by the national team, it is supported by a significant part of the population. The national team won the African Cup of Nations in 1962.

== Basketball ==
Ethiopia joined the international basketball governing body FIBA in 1949 and has the longest basketball tradition in Sub-Saharan Africa. Since the 1960s, however, the national team fell behind its African competition but aims to return to former glory.

== See also ==
- Ethiopia at the Olympics
- Ethiopia national football team
- Ethiopian Football Federation
- Ministry of Youth and Sport (Ethiopia)
