= Isaac Ikhouria =

Nigerian boxer (born 1947)

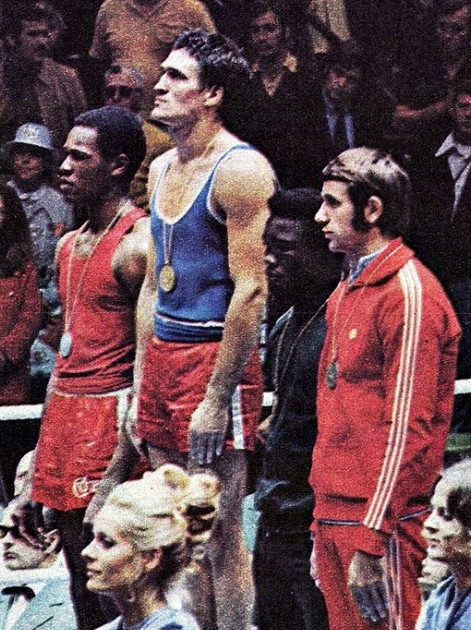
- Ikhouria (2nd right) at the 1972 Olympics

Personal information
- Born: 9 October 1947 (age 78)
- Height: 174 cm (5 ft 9 in)

Sport
- Sport: Boxing
Medal record
Representing Nigeria
Olympic Games
Bronze medal – third place	1972 Munich	-81 kg
All-Africa Games
Gold medal – first place	1973 Lagos	-81 kg

Isaac Ikhouria (born 9 October 1947) is a retired light-heavyweight boxer from Nigeria who won a bronze medal at the 1972 Summer Olympics. A year later he won a gold medal at the 1973 All-Africa Games.
