= Waldemar de Oliveira =

Brazilian boxer (born 1951)

Personal information
- Born: 22 July 1951 Bom Conselho, Brazil
- Died: 1 October 2013 (aged 62)

Sport
- Sport: Boxing
Medal record
Men's amateur boxing
Representing Brazil
Pan American Games
Silver medal – second place	1971 Cali	Light heavyweight

Waldemar de Oliveira (22 July 1951 – 1 October 2013) was a Brazilian boxer. He competed in the men's light heavyweight event at the 1972 Summer Olympics.
