= Nikolay Anfimov =

Uzbekistani boxer (born 1950)

Personal information
- Nationality: Uzbekistani
- Born: 28 December 1950 (age 74); Samarkand, Uzbek SSR, Soviet Union

Sport
- Sport: Boxing

Nikolay Anfimov (Russian: Никола́й Ю́рьевич Анфи́мов; born 28 December 1950) is an Uzbekistani boxer. He competed in the men's light heavyweight event at the 1972 Summer Olympics.
