= Jaroslav Král =

Czechoslovak boxer

Personal information
- Nationality: Czechoslovak
- Born: 6 March 1948 (age 77)

Sport
- Sport: Boxing

Jaroslav Král (born 6 March 1948) is a Czechoslovak boxer. He competed in the men's light heavyweight event at the 1972 Summer Olympics. In his first fight, he lost to Janusz Gortat of Poland.
