= Samson Laizer =

Tanzanian boxer (born 1949)

Personal information
- Full name: Samson Hassan laiser
- Nationality: Tanzanian
- Born: 30 December 1949 (age 75); Arusha tanzania
- Died: 19/2/2021; Bagamoyo pwani tanzania

Sport
- Sport: Boxing

Samson Hassan Laizer (born 31 December 1949) is a Tanzanian boxer. He competed in the men's light heavyweight event at the 1972 Summer Olympics.
