= Marian Culineac =

Romanian boxer

Personal information
- Nationality: Romanian
- Born: 1 January 1952 (age 73); Bucharest, Romania

Sport
- Sport: Boxing

Marian Culineac (born 1 January 1952) is a Romanian boxer. He competed in the men's light heavyweight event at the 1972 Summer Olympics.
