= Ahmed Mahmoud Aly =

Egyptian boxer

Personal information
- Nationality: Egyptian
- Born: 12 September 1945 (age 80)

Sport
- Sport: Boxing

Ahmed Mahmoud Aly (born 12 September 1945) is an Egyptian boxer. He competed in the men's light heavyweight event at the 1972 Summer Olympics. He was also entered in the heavyweight tournament at the 1976 Montreal Olympics, but was given a walkover loss when he did not appear for his opening bout.
