= Imre Tóth (boxer) =

Hungarian boxer

Personal information
- Nationality: Hungarian
- Born: 6 May 1948 Budapest, Hungary
- Died: 13 April 2017 (aged 68) Hungary

Sport
- Sport: Boxing

Imre Tóth (6 May 1948 – 13 April 2017) was a Hungarian boxer. He competed in the men's light heavyweight event at the 1972 Summer Olympics.
