= Brzozów, Gmina Rzeczyca =

Brzozów
- Village
- Location within Poland
- Coordinates: 51°37′51″N 20°15′34″E
- Country: Poland
- Voivodeship: Łódź
- County: Tomaszów
- Gmina: Rzeczyca
- Population: 216

Brzozów [ˈbʐɔzuf] (German: Birkenfeld or Birkenfelde) is a village founded in 1802 as a Prussian colony and today belongs to the administrative district of Gmina Rzeczyca, within Tomaszów County, Łódź Voivodeship, in central Poland.

== Geography ==
The L-shaped village of Brzozów, seen from the air, is located in an almost flat area amidst vast agricultural land to the north of an extensive forest area. At its northern end, Brzozów is surrounded by the Luboczanka (formerly Leśnica ), a small left-bank tributary of the Pilica . The Luboczanka flows near Brzozów in a small valley which is a few meters lower than the surrounding flat farmland and is covered with bushes and trees.

7 km (4 mi) north-west of the village runs the European route E67 from Prague to Helsinki (so-called "Via Baltica"), which also forms the inner-Polish expressway S8 (Wrocław - Białystok ). 2 km (1 mi) east of Brzozów runs the Droga wojewódzka (provincial road) 726 between Rawa Mazowiecka and Inowłódz through the neighbouring village of Sadykierz in a north-south direction . 10 km (6 mi) east runs the Central Railway Line, built in the 1970s to improve connections between Warsaw and Kraków; however, the depot in Strzałki near Brzozów is only for internal purposes and is not available to passengers. The nearest publicly accessible railway station has been in the district town of Tomaszów since 1885.

== History ==
=== Founded in Prussian times ===
In the 18th century, the site of the present-day village of Brzozów was merely a forest. During the three partitions of Poland from 1772 to 1795, Prussia, Russia and Austria took over the dual state of Poland-Lithuania and divided it up among themselves. Prussia formed its new province of South Prussia from the territories gained through the second partition in 1793. Since it was not expected that these territories would have to be given up again after just 14 years, efforts were made to intensify agricultural use using the latest findings and advertising campaigns were used to bring settlers from other German states into the country, particularly from Württemberg, which was then under pressure from Napoleon . In this way, a large number of so-called colonies were created whose inhabitants were not serfs, but free farmers. In 1802, when colonization was already in full swing, the best settlement areas had already been taken and the Prussian colonization administration under Captain von Nothardt was already struggling to accommodate all the influx of settlers, a new colony called Erdmannsweiler was established in a forest area 16 km (10 mi) west of Rawa Mazowiecka on the banks of the Rawka next to an existing mill . This was designed for 368 residents in 72 farms and was therefore quite large, but in terms of its ratio of area per farm it was one of the poorer colonies. Local historian Otto Heike assumes that the group of immigrants for whom these 72 farms were intended was significantly larger than planned and that is why another colony called Birkenfeld was founded at the same time 22 km (14 mi) further southeast in an absolutely peripheral location to accommodate those settlers who could no longer be accommodated in Erdmannsweiler.

Birkenfeld (depending on the source also called Birkenfelde), like Erdmannsweiler, was located in an area of moderately productive sandy soils, which in both cases had to be cleared first, and was also far away from any other Prussian colonies, but only 5 km (3 mi) from the Pilica, which flows south of the village and formed the border between Prussia and Austria at that time. It was named after the town of Birkenfeld on the Württemberg- Baden border near Pforzheim, because among the first 12 settlers of the new colony were two families (Nicolaus Brunner and Anton Zimmermann), who came from Birkenfeld in Württemberg. This method of naming was often used during the colonization of South Prussia.

The Birkenfeld colony had 38 settler sites (farms) with a total of 216 inhabitants, making it one of the smaller ones established in South Prussia. Nevertheless, the residents attached importance to having their own village school, which was built in the first few years after the settlement. It existed as a German school at least until 1919. Administratively, Birkenfeld belonged to the Lubochnia district, 14 km (9 mi) to the west .

Little is known about the further specific history of the village, but it can be assumed that the general development was similar to that in Erdmannsweiler. In Birkenfeld, too, the clearing work was probably not yet finished when Prussia collapsed in 1806, so it had to be continued without state help and in particular by foregoing the colonists' privileges offered by Prussia (subsidies, tax exemptions, etc.). With the formation of the Duchy of Warsaw by Napoleon, the colonists even had to pay taxes. The hardship increased in 1809 with Austria's Vistula campaign and in 1812 with Napoleon's Russian campaign, initially with troop movements and requisitions, then with the returning disbanded troops and the subsequent Russian occupation. It was not until after the Congress of Vienna in 1815 that times calmed down a little: Congress Poland was formed and de facto placed under the Russian Tsar .

=== After Napoleon ===
At the beginning of the Congress Polish period, a decree of the governor in Warsaw on May 2, 1820 replaced numerous German place names with Polish ones. Birkenfeld was renamed Brzozów, which can be translated into German as "Birklingen" (Polish brzoza = birch, -ów = ending for a location). However, the residents continued to use the German language and the place name Birkenfeld among themselves until 1945. The new name for Erdmannsweiler, however, was Kochanów, which has a completely different meaning in Polish (Polish kochany = dear). Both variants were also used in numerous other renamings.

For the year 1827, the Geographical Dictionary of the Kingdom of Poland from 1880 lists 260 inhabitants in 28 houses for Brzozów, but at the time of printing there were already 436 inhabitants in 40 houses. The number of 28 houses in 1827 (i.e. 10 fewer than at the time of foundation) could be a typo, since the "Warsaw List of Colonies and Colonists from 1835" already lists 37 colonists and 210 relatives in 39 fireplaces and there is no temporary drop in the number of houses in neighboring Kochanów. In a census in 1851, 316 "Germans" were found in Brzozów. Based on their origins and the conditions in the other South Prussian "Swabian colonies", it can be assumed that the inhabitants were mostly Protestant and tried to limit the influx of (mostly Catholic) Poles as much as possible. In 1821, a Protestant community was founded in Rawa Mazowiecka, to which the Brzozów Protestants also belonged from then on. Nothing is known about the construction of a church in Brzozów - in contrast to Kochanów - but there was a German cemetery 200 m southeast of the town, where some gravestones from the 1910s with German inscriptions can still be found today.

As in Kochanów, however, it can be assumed that the pastor from Rawa only came occasionally and that the service was usually held by the local cantor, who was usually also a teacher at the school established in the village . The existence of the school is documented at the latest in 1865.

Significant events after the founding of Congress Poland were the November Uprising of 1830/31 and the January Uprising of 1863/64, but neither of these brought Poland the independence from Russia it longed for, but on the contrary led to an even more rigid rule by the Tsar over his Polish territories. The only improvement for the Polish peasants was the abolition of serfdom in 1864, after this step had already been implemented (at least formally) in Russia in 1861. As a result, not only the sons of landless colonists, but also Polish peasants could now move to the growing new industrial cities such as Łódź or Żyrardów, also only 42 km (26 mi) away, without the permission of their landlords and try to earn a living there as factory workers.

=== 20th century ===
The Second World War began on September 1, 1939 with the German Wehrmacht's invasion of Poland, which ended a few weeks later with the subjugation of Poland, in which the Soviet Union also took part. While nearby Łódź (renamed Litzmannstadt in 1940) was, contrary to initial plans, annexed to the newly formed Reichsgau Wartheland and thus to the actual German Reich in November 1939, Brzozów (like Kochanów) fell to the so-called General Government, a kind of Polish rump state under German control, which, according to the will of the National Socialists, should have the main task of making all its resources available to the German Reich without regard for its own well-being. The border with the Warthegau ran about 10 km (6 mi) west of Kochanów.

For Brzozów, the Second World War ended in mid-January 1945 with a major offensive by the Red Army called the Vistula-Oder Operation, which was not unexpected for Germany but nevertheless surprising in its timing and form. The operation overran all of central Poland within a few days and wiped out any German resistance, if it still existed, in a very short time. After the situation had consolidated and the war officially ended in May 1945, the Polish government took power again. As a result, many ethnic German residents left the country, and the houses and farms of Brzozów were taken over by Poles.

After the Polish administrative reform in 1975, which abolished the powiat (district) level and increased the number of voivodeships (provinces) from 16 to 49, Brzozów belonged administratively to the Piotrków Voivodeship, and after its dissolution in 1998 it again belonged to the Łódź Voivodeship. By the late 1950s at the latest, there was also a primary school again, but it has since been closed. The German cemetery still exists. It had become overgrown over the decades, but was cleared by army members on 6 and 7 November 2018, and a candle was lit at the memorial to the dead of the First World War . The tall wooden cross has also been preserved to this day and is now clearly visible again.
