= Mexico City College =

English-speaking college in Mexico (1940–1985)

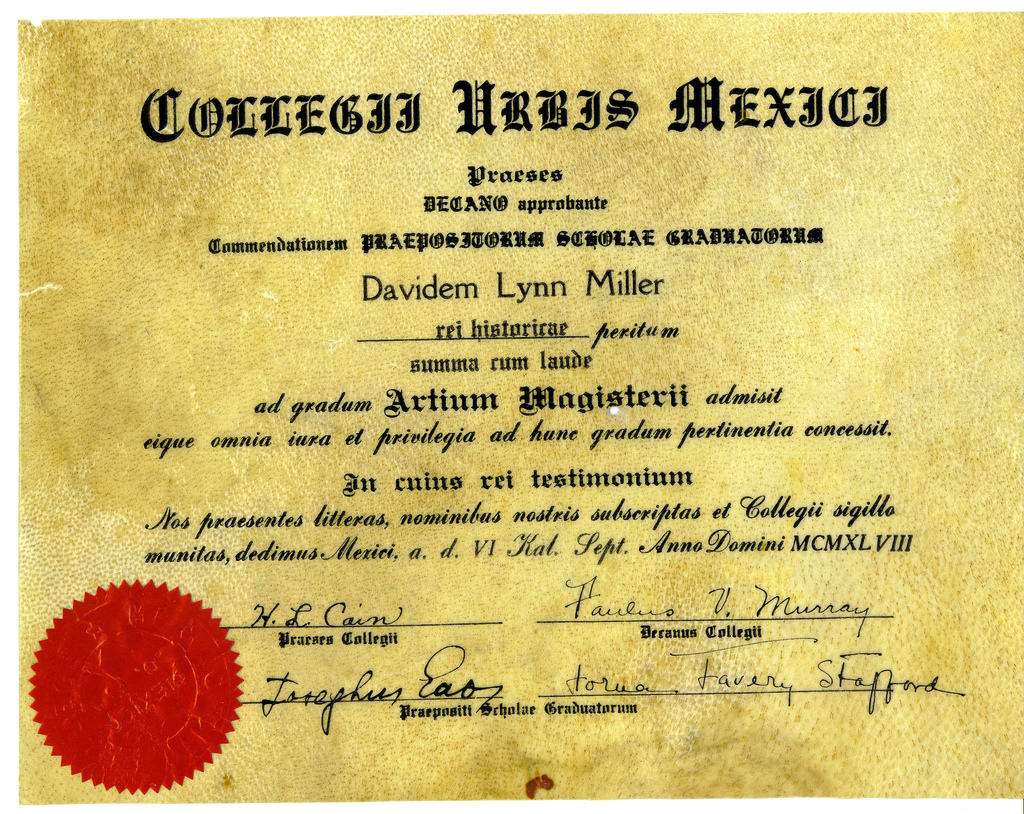
Diploma from Mexico City College, 1948 (in Latin)

Mexico City College was founded in 1940, as an English-speaking junior college in Mexico City, Mexico.

In 1946, the college became a four-year Bachelor of Arts degree-awarding institution, changing its name to University of the Americas in 1963. In 1968, the college became Universidad de las Americas, as it began the transition into a Spanish-speaking institution, culminating in its move to Cholula, Puebla, in 1971.

Because of internal problems, the campus split in 1985 into two separate institutions:

- UDLA – Universidad de las Américas, A.C., in Mexico City, Mexico.
- UDLAP – Universidad de las Américas Puebla, in Cholula, Puebla, Mexico.
