= Universidad de las Américas, A.C. =

Private university in Mexico City, Mexico

Coordinates: 19.4223°N 99.1663°W

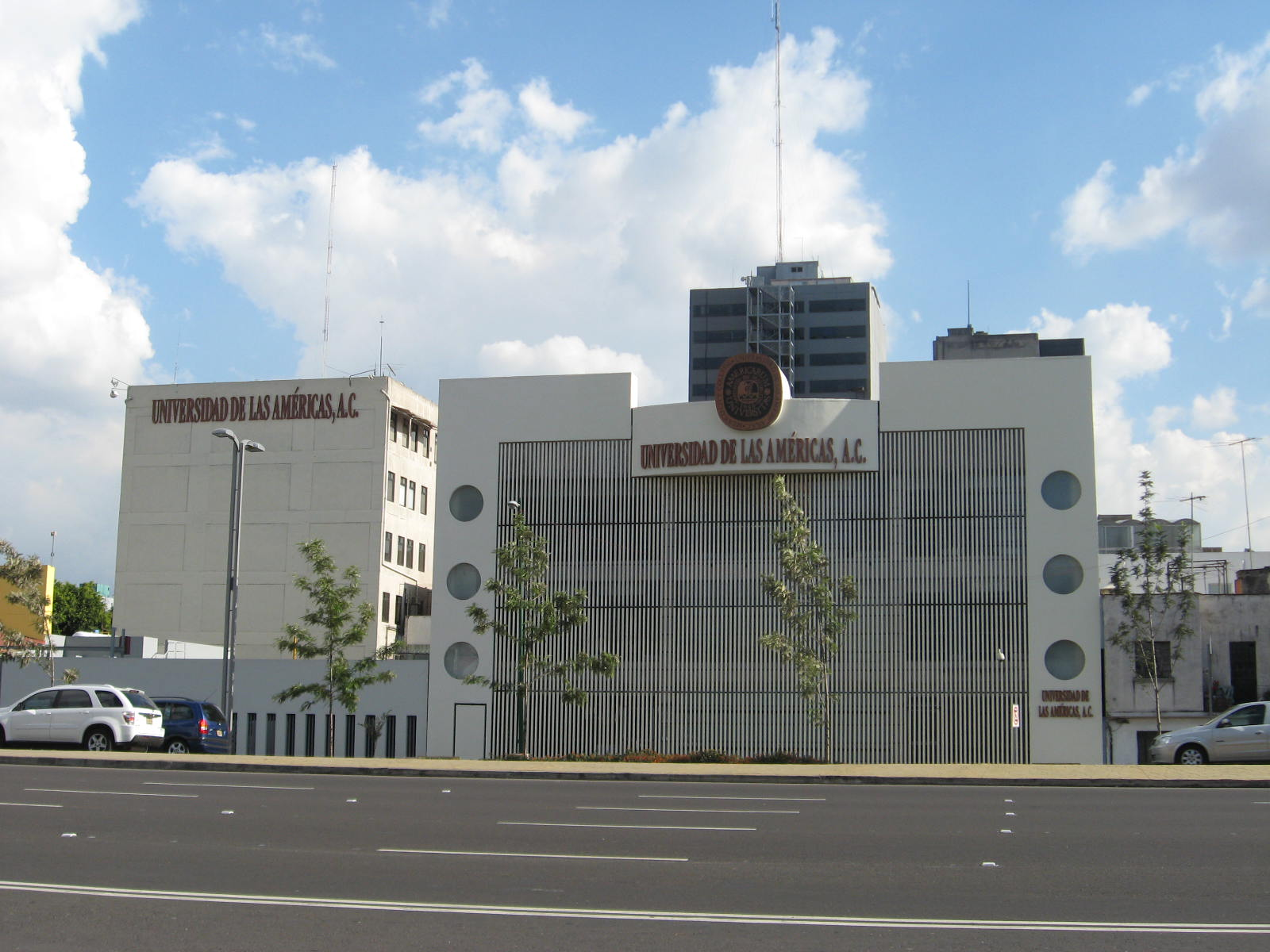
- UDLA Campus on Chapultepec Ave in Mexico City
- Motto: SAPIENTIA PAX FRATERNITAS
- Type: Private
- Established: 1940
- President: Alejandro Gertz Manero
- Location: Puebla 223, col. Roma, Mexico City, Mexico City, Mexico
- Website: http://www.udladf.mx/

The Universidad de las Américas, Asociación Civil (UDLA, A.C.) is a university located in Mexico City, Mexico. It was founded in 1940 as the Mexico City College (MCC). In 1963, its name was changed to the University of the Americas and in 1968 to the Universidad de las Américas.

Since its founding the university has been located first in leased buildings at the Colonia Roma in Mexico City during the 1950s and later on an eight-acre campus on the Mexico-Toluca Road. In the 1970s the university moved to a new campus in the State of Puebla, where it remained until 1985. That year, the Board of Associates decided to move all operations to Mexico City and to separate from the Universidad de las Américas Puebla.

At the present time the university continues its mission as a bilingual (English–Spanish) institution, the only one in Mexico offering general instruction in two languages.

== International classifications ==
The Universidad de las Américas, A.C. is qualified as follows in the national lists published in Mexican newspapers Reforma and El Universal en 2012:

- Psychology: 2nd place in Reforma and 2nd place in El Universal
- Business administration: 7th place in Reforma and 2nd place in El Universal
- Information systems: 4th place in Reforma and no evaluation in El Universal
- International relations: 6th place in Reforma and 4th place in El Universal
- Mass media: 8th place in Reforma and 2nd place in El Universal
- Law: 11th place in El Universal and no evaluation in Reforma

The program in special education is not evaluated in the surveys.

== Accreditation ==
The Universidad de las Américas, A.C., is accredited by the following associations

At national level:

- The Ministry of Public Education Secretaría de Educación Pública (SEP in Spanish) Grants to BA, specialty, master and doctorate the Recognition of Official Validity (RVOE in Spanish).
- The National Association of Universities and Higher Educations Institutions (ANUIES in Spanish), Accredited since 1998.
- Federation of Mexican Private Institutions of Higher Education, (FIMPES) accredited for the 2006-2012 period.
- National Council for Teaching and Research in Psychology (CNEIP) Consejo Nacional para la Enseñanza e Investigación en Psicología (CNEIP)
- Council for the Accreditation of Communication A.C. (CONAC) Consejo de Acreditación de la Comunicación A.C. (CONAC)
- Accrediting Council in the Teaching of Accounting and Management, A.C. (CACECA) Consejo de Acreditación en la Enseñanza de la Contaduría y Administración A.C. (CACECA)
- Association for the Accreditation and Certification in Social Sciences, A.C. (ACCESISO) Asociación para la Acreditación y Certificación en Ciencias Sociales, A.C. (ACCESISO)
- National Council for the Accreditation of Higher Education in Law, A.C. (CONFEDE) Consejo Nacional para la Acreditacion de la Educación Superior en Derecho, A.C. (CONFEDE)

At the international level:

- Southern Association of Colleges and Schools (SACS)

== Academic programs ==
Area	Undergraduate programs	Specialties	Master's degrees	Doctorates
Division of Management Sciences	Licenciatura en administración de empresas; Bachelor of Business Administration; Licenciatura en informática y tecnologías de información; Bachelor of Science in Computer Information Systems	Especialidad en administración avanzada; Specialty in Advanced Administration	Maestría en administración; Master of Business Administration	
Division of Behavioral and Developmental Sciences	Licenciatura en psicología; Bachelor of arts in Psychology		Maestría en psicología clínica; Master of Arts in Clinical Psychology	Doctorado en psicología; Doctorate in Psychology
Division of Law	Licenciatura en derecho; Bachelor of Arts in Legal Studies			
Division of International Trade and Relations	Licenciatura en relaciones internacionales; Bachelor of Arts in International Studies	Especialidad en comercio exterior; Specialty in Foreign Trade	Maestría en negocios y comercio internacional; Master of Business and International Trade	
Department of Education	Licenciatura en comunicación humana (educación especial); Bachelor of Science in Human Communication Disorders	Especialidad en desarrollo cognoscitivo; Specialty in Cognitive Development	Maestría en educación; Master of Arts in Education	
Department of Mass Media	Licenciatura en comunicación; Bachelor of Arts in Mass Media			

=== Continuing education ===
The Universidad de las Américas offers continuing education courses and diploma programs in management, education, psychology, science and technology and law.

== Notable graduates ==
- Ricardo Blanco, products communication manager for Latin America in YouTube and Google
- Mauricio Cabrera, general editor, [mediotiempo.com] (Expansión Editorial Group)
- Gilberto Carrillo, chief of information auditing in Radiomóvil DIPSA, S.A de C.V. (Telcel)
