= Rudi Hornig =

German boxer (1938–2014)

Personal information
- Full name: Rudolf Hornig
- Nationality: German
- Born: 10 August 1938; Berlin, Germany
- Died: May 2014 (aged 75)
- Height: 180 cm (5 ft 11 in)
- Weight: 78 kg (172 lb)

Sport
- Sport: Boxing

Rudolf Hornig (10 August 1938 – May 2014) was a German boxer. He competed in the men's light heavyweight event at the 1972 Summer Olympics.
