= Ernesto Sánchez =

Venezuelan boxer

Personal information
- Nationality: Venezuelan
- Born: 7 November 1947
- Died: 19 September 2024 (aged 76)

Sport
- Sport: Boxing

Ernesto Sánchez (7 November 1947 – 19 September 2024) was a Venezuelan boxer. He competed at the 1972 Summer Olympics and the 1976 Summer Olympics.
