= Hassan Nour-el-Din Aman =

Egyptian boxer (born 1943)

Personal information
- Nationality: Egyptian and Chadian
- Born: 19 November 1930 (age 94); Cairo, Egypt

Sport
- Sport: Boxing

Hassan Nour-el-Din Aman (born 7 May 1943) is an Egyptian-Chadian boxer. He competed in the men's light heavyweight event at the 1968 Summer Olympics. At the 1968 Summer Olympics, he lost to Jürgen Schlegel of East Germany.

Hassan represented Chad at the 1972 Summer Olympics in Munich in the Light-heavyweight class, in the first round he was drawn against Yugoslavian Mate Parlov, he was stopped in the second round, Mate Parlov went on to win the gold medal.
