= Henri Moreau (boxer) =

French boxer

Personal information
- Full name: Henri-Claude Moreau
- Nationality: French
- Born: 5 August 1945 (age 79)

Sport
- Sport: Boxing

Henri-Claude Moreau (French pronunciation: [ɑ̃ʁi klod mɔʁo]; born 5 August 1945) is a French boxer. He competed in the men's light heavyweight event at the 1972 Summer Olympics.
