= Seifu Makonnen =

Ethiopian boxer (1952–2020)

Seifu Makonnen in 1976 preparing for Montreal Olympics

Seifu Makonnen (11 June 1952 – 15 June 2020), known by the nickname Tibo, was a two-time Olympic boxer from Ethiopia.

== Biography ==
He was born in Aleltu, in the province of Showa. By the age of 12, he already showed athletic prowess as a bodybuilder. In 1971, inspired by Muhammad Ali, he became a boxer. An American coach, Edward Simon, recognized Makonnen's ability and welcomed Makonnen into his classes.

Makonnen then fought exhibition bouts in front of as many as 50,000 people at His Imperial Majesty Haile Selassie Stadium. In August 1972, the Ethiopian Olympic Committee chose Makonnen for the team at the 1972 Munich Olympics as a light heavyweight. Awarded a scholarship by the German Sports Ministry, Makonnen went to Berlin two months early to train in the 1936 Berlin Olympic Stadium. While in Germany, he fought 10 exhibition fights and finished a course of studies in exercise science. At the 1972 Olympics, he lost his only bout to Harald Skog of Norway on points. Makonnen ended in an eight-way tie for ninth place out of 28 fighters in the Olympic finals. He earned the nickname Tibo, which means knockout in Amharic. In 1974 he was imprisoned by the Derg regime for several months.

In 1976, Makonnen was again selected for the 1976 Summer Olympics in Montreal and many said he was a medal hope, but he was unable to compete because of the African boycott of the Olympics. His scheduled bout with Robert Burgess of Bermuda was listed as a walk-over (not available to compete). Makonnen received awards and recognition from His Imperial Majesty Haile Selassie of Ethiopia, president Jomo Kenyatta of Kenya, president Idi Amin of Uganda, and president Julius Nyerere of Tanzania.

After 1976, Makonnen fought and won in Russia and throughout Africa, then returned to Ethiopia as a national trainer. In 1980, he moved to the United States and trained athletes in many sports, including track & field and soccer, as well as boxing. Makonnen started a weekly sports radio program in Amharic for the Ethiopian community in Washington, DC, interviewing more than 180 people over the years. In the mid-1980s he moved to Los Angeles where he co-founded the Dengel Mariam Orthodox Church, serving on their board from 1986 to 1993. He was also active in support of the Los Angeles Ethiopian soccer team. Until 2006, he hosted a weekly Ethiopian Olympic sports program on New World Radio (WUST 1120 AM). Makonnen led an annual celebration of the anniversary of Abebe Bikila's Olympic Marathon victories.

Makonnen died in Los Angeles after a long illness with diabetes.
