= Raymond Russell (boxer) =

American boxer

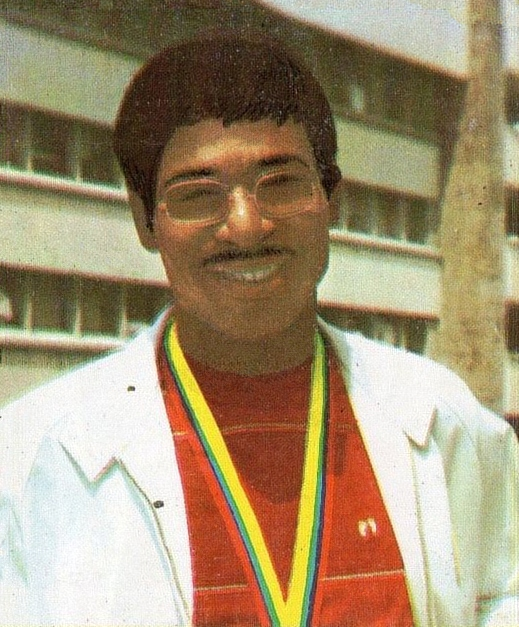
- Raymond Russell in 1972

Personal information
- Born: May 1, 1940 (age 86) Cincinnati, Ohio, U. S.
- Height: 194 cm (6 ft 4 in)
- Weight: 81 kg (179 lb)

Sport
- Sport: Boxing
- Club: U.S. Marine Corps
Medal record
Representing the United States
Pan American Games
Gold medal – first place	1971 Cali	-81 kg

Raymond Narville Russell (born May 1, 1940) is a retired American light-heavyweight boxer. He won a gold medal at the 1971 Pan American Games and competed at the 1972 Summer Olympics.
