= Gilberto Carrillo =

Cuban boxer (1951–1996)

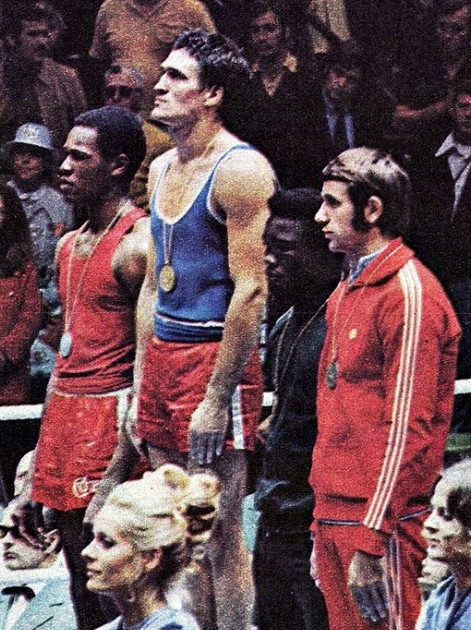
- Carrillo (left) at the 1972 Olympics

Personal information
- Full name: Gilberto Carrillo Quesada
- Born: August 16, 1951 Matanzas, Cuba
- Died: 1996 Matanzas, Cuba
- Height: 1.88 m (6 ft 2 in)
- Weight: 81 kg (179 lb)

Sport
- Sport: Boxing
- Weight class: Light heavyweight
Medal record
Representing Cuba
Olympic Games
Silver medal – second place	1972 Munich	81 kg

Gilberto Carillo (16 August 1951 – 1996) was an amateur light-heavyweight boxer from Cuba who won a silver medal at the 1972 Olympics. His elder brother Nancio was also an Olympic boxer, and his niece Nancy was an Olympic volleyball player.
