= National Stud Farm of Chaouchaoua =

Horse stud farm in Algeria

- المركز الوطني لتربية الخيول شاوشاوى
- Interactive map of National Stud Farm of Chaouchaoua
- Coordinates: 35°23′47″N 1°22′7″E
- Opening date: 1874

The National Stud Farm of Chaouchaoua (Arabic: المركز الوطني لتربية الخيول شاوشاوى; French: Haras national de Chaouchaoua) is a stud-farm in Tiaret, Algeria. Established in 1874, its primary focus is the preservation and improvement of Algerian horse breeds.

== History ==
The National Stud Farm of Chaouchaoua was established in 1874 by the French Ministry of War, originally named Jumenterie de Tiaret. Its original mission was to supply the French army with horses. In the early 20th century, it bred up to 22,000 foals per year, including military mounts (Barb, Arabian, and Arab-Barb breeds) as well as working horses for agriculture.

Following Algeria's independence in 1962, Chaouchaoua became an Algerian national stud farm. However, the number of horses decreased significantly by the end of 2018.

== Activities ==
The National Stud Farm of Chaouchaoua is not subsidized by the government and has to generate its own resources, primarily through the cultivation and sale of fodder and cereals, to ensure its operation.

The 371 hectares of land at the stud farm contribute to agricultural production, which accounted for 60% of its financial income in 2018. However, the agricultural area has been significantly reduced, and the effects of climate change have negatively impacted cereal production, resulting in a reduction in volume of approximately 60%.

The stud farm trains young horses for harness and saddle work and also prepares and presents young stallions for breeding competition. Some of the trained horses are integrated into the Republican Guard at the Soumaa Police School, and others have been exported to Germany, France, Italy, Switzerland, and Brazil.

The stud farm offers continuing education courses, particularly for veterinary medicine, horse breeding, horse care, nutrition, harnessing, and farriery. It also offers apprenticeships and internships.

The stud farm is actively involved in research, particularly aimed at improving horse behavior, health, and fertility. Research has included genetics, infectious and hereditary diseases, animal husbandry, and the enhancement of natural methods of reproduction and fertilization, as well as techniques such as artificial insemination and embryo transfer. The stud farm's research activities are conducted in collaboration with a network of partners, including veterinary faculties, universities, and equine breeding organizations.

The breeding center at the National Stud Farm of Chaouchaoua conducts research in the field of horse fertility, and offers services to mare and stallion owners, particularly in the area of fertility.

== Stallions ==
Ouassal (1969 - 1 January 1991)
The Barb breed was no longer recognized in France after 1962, at the end of the Algerian War and the dissolution of the last Spahi regiments. However, in 1990, the breed was re-recognized for the stallion Ouassal, who was then twenty-two years old but was finally allowed to breed mares legitimately. Unfortunately, on 1 January 1991, during his third mating, his heart suddenly stopped. Despite this, Ouassal fathered 37 offspring. In 1975, Ouassal had been gifted to French President Valéry Giscard d'Estaing, marking the first official visit by a head of state from the former colonial empire to Algeria since its independence.

Mabrouk (1994–)
The white stallion Mabrouk was deemed unworthy of representing the pure Barb breed by the French zootechnicians to whom he was entrusted, and he was reclassified as "Arabian-Barb." In March 2003, Mabrouk was gifted to Jacques Chirac.

Kheir (2004–)
On 5 December 2007, the stud farm presented Kheir, a gray Arabian thoroughbred, to French President Nicolas Sarkozy after his visit to Algiers.

Sami and Sadja
A pair of Barb horses, Sami (dark gray stallion) and Sadja (bay mare), were gifted to French President François Hollande on 20 December 2012, following his visit to Algeria. Upon their arrival in France, the pair was separated—Sami going to the Haras national du Pin, where breeding is no longer practiced, and Sadja was sent to the Pompadour Stud Farm, where the government had stopped breeding for foals. However, in 2016, a filly named Gemme Pompadour was born from their union. Both Sami and Sadja were bred from 2015 to 2016. On 18 May 2017, another filly named Hiba was born from Sami mating with another mare. Although the former president was not a horseman, he became aware of Sami's genetic quality, and he agreed to allow ten matings per year to be granted to the national association of the Barb breed.
