= Horses in Morocco =

Horses in Moroccan culture

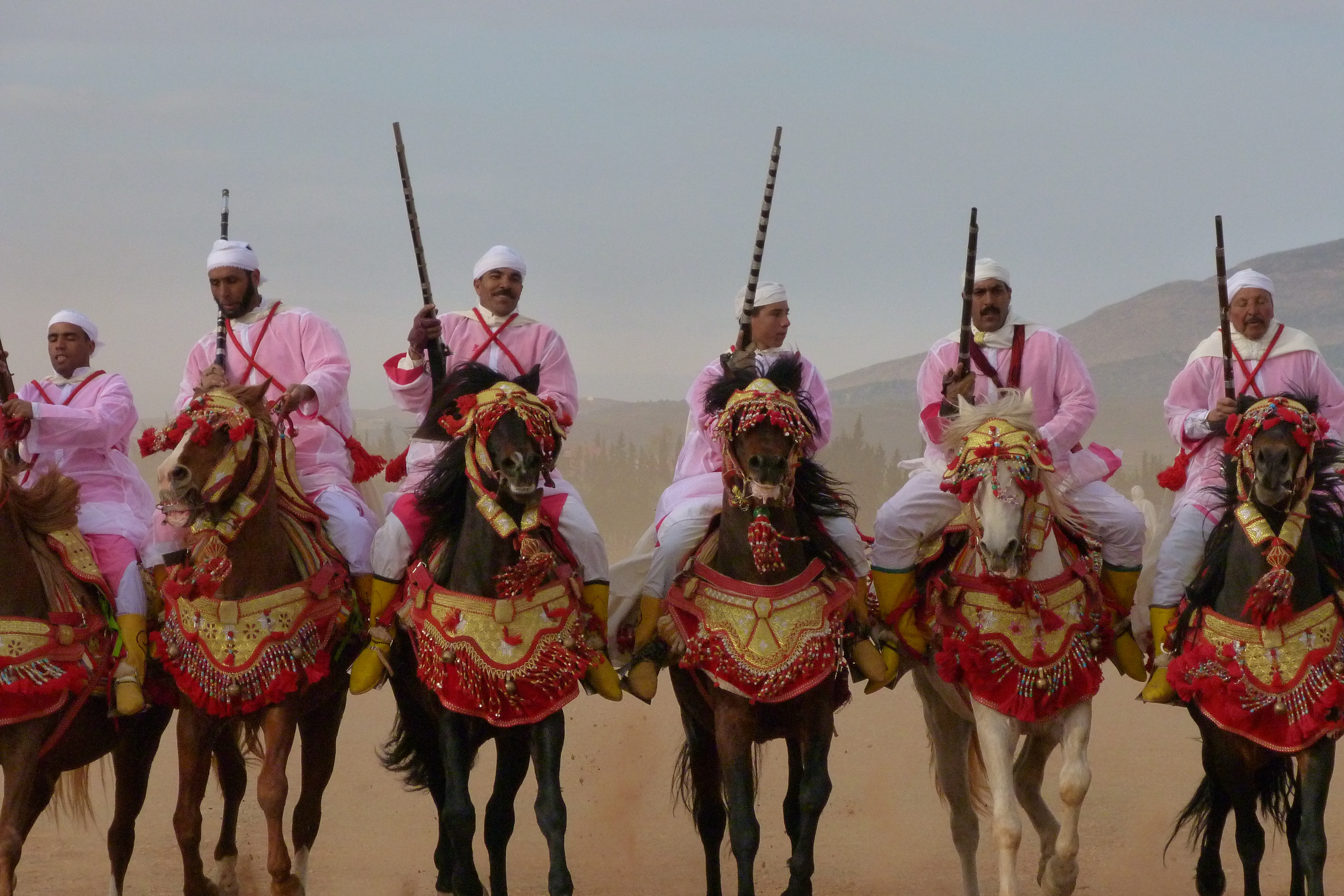
Fantasia at Beni Drar in the region of Oujda, Morocco, region Oriental.

Horses in Morocco are an ancient tradition, linked to the history of the Berber cavalry. The Barb and Arab-Barb breeds are considered a national heritage in Morocco, having been bred by numerous local tribes. Tbourida, the most popular Moroccan equestrian sport, showcases the military use of the Barb or Arab-Barb horse. The country boasts five national stud farms in Marrakesh, Meknes, Bouznika, Oujda and El Jadida. It organizes major international equestrian events, such as the El Jadida International Horse Show and the Morocco Royal Tour, as well as national sporting events, such as the Rabat Horse Week.

== History ==
Horses are linked to the history of the Berber and Arab peoples who inhabit the Moroccan territory; moreover, according to Philippe Barbié de Préaudeau, Morocco is probably the Maghreb country that has preserved its equestrian practices with the greatest continuity.

=== Protectorate period ===
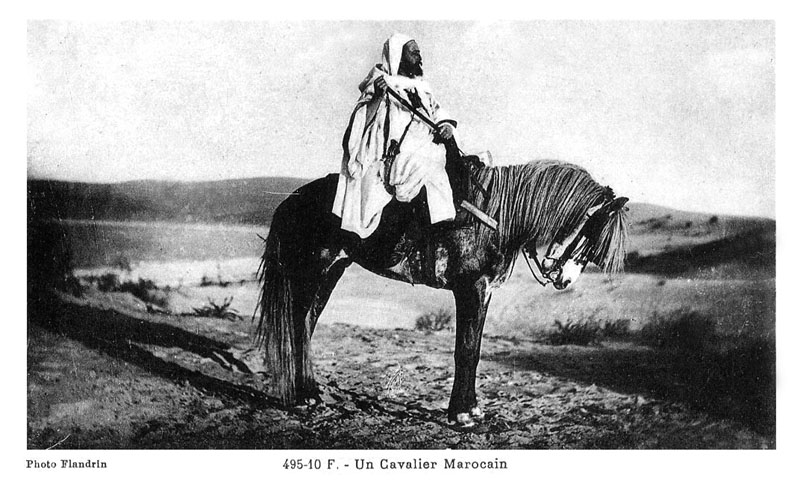
Moroccan rider in the early 20th century.

During the French protectorate, a Service des remontes et haras was created in 1906, with two mare farms in Témara and Meknes, and a stallion depot in Mazagan. A number of military stud farms were thus created in Morocco, the oldest of which was the Meknes stud farm in 1912. The first scientific works in equine veterinary medicine appeared under the impetus of the Research Laboratory of the Livestock Service in Casablanca. Arab horses were imported from France, Algeria, Tunisia and Syria, but there was also movement in the opposite direction, with some of the best Maghreb horses going to France. The closure of the Témara mare farm in 1927 led to the transfer of the livestock to the national stud farm in Meknes. In 1947, horse breeding was transferred from military control to the Ministry of Agriculture.

=== After Moroccan independence ===
After Moroccan independence, veterinary medicine was taught at the Hassan-II Agronomic and Veterinary Institute in 1970, leading to publications in equine veterinary medicine. A studbook was created for the Moroccan Arab Thoroughbred in 1982. Over the course of the 20th century, the Moroccan horse industry declined, due to the increasing scarcity of uses for horses. Since 2000, the Moroccan royal family has supported the development of equestrian sports and the organization of a growing number of international equestrian events on Moroccan soil. The Société royale d'encouragement du cheval (SOREC) was created in 2003 for this purpose, at a time when the national herd of 130,000 horses is declining every year.

Renovation and equipment work at Morocco's five national stud farms began in 2010. The technical quality of Moroccan studs is now close to that of European studs.

In 2007, the equestrian sector accounted for 3.4 billion dirhams of Morocco's gross domestic product. By the end of 2014, horse-riding had become the second most popular sport in Morocco, behind football. In 2012, 11,500 Moroccan jobs depended directly or indirectly on the horse; in 2015, another estimate gives around 30,000 jobs in this sector, or 0.61% of Moroccan GDP, corresponding to 6 billion dirhams.

A modern veterinary clinic at the Institut Agronomique et Vétérinaire Hassan-II in Rabat opened in September 2016, and performed the first surgery on a horse on Moroccan soil in November 2016.

== Practices ==
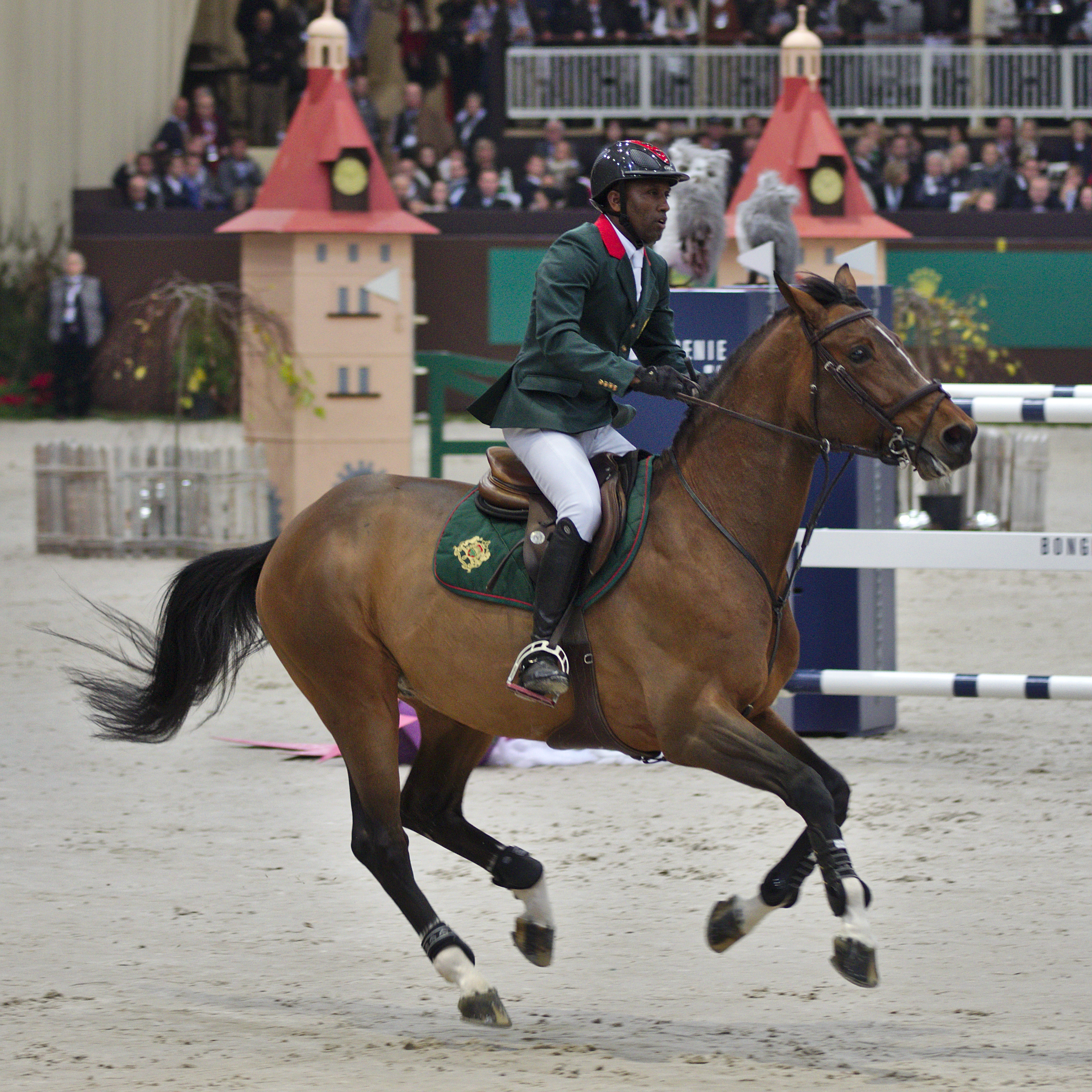
Abdelkebir Ouaddar and Quickly de Kreisker at the CHI de Genève in 2013.

According to the Royal Moroccan Federation of Equestrian Sports, tbourida is the leading equestrian discipline in the country, well ahead of show jumping, dressage and endurance. The sector is evolving from a relationship with a working animal to practices based on sport and leisure.

However, riding and equestrian sports are still not widely practiced in Morocco, where there are some 20,000 riders in riding schools or private stables. Moroccan riders can pass four grades certifying their equestrian skills, known as "Fariss". Since 2012, Moroccan rider Abdelkebir Ouaddar has been making a name for himself. He reached the highest level thanks to King Mohammed VI, who bought the French Selle stallion Quickly de Kreisker for him from a Breton rider, Benjamin Robert. Since 2017, his daughter Soukaina Ouaddar has been making her debut in international show jumping.

Equestrian tourism has a strong presence and is developing rapidly.

The horse racing sector is also growing, with 500 new races organized between 2011 and 2016. Some 2,400 races are organized in Morocco every year, and 560 venues offer betting facilities. In April 2016, a woman jockey took part in a race in Morocco for the first time. In June 2017, Morocco has 3 female jockeys, including Zineb el Briouil.

Horses are associated with everyday celebrations and ceremonies, such as circumcision, weddings and moussem. Kings Hassan II and Mohammed VI have both declared that the horse is an integral part of Moroccan culture and civilization. Members of the royal family also take part in numerous national and international equestrian events.

== Breeding ==
Traditional Moroccan horse tack.

In 2005, Morocco had 160,000 horses of all breeds. Between 2011 and 2017, the number of new births rose by 24%, or 900 more horses. The country's main breeds are the Arabian and Barb. More rarely, Morocco also breeds Arabians, Thoroughbreds and Anglo-Arabians. However, mule breeding for agricultural work is still very common. SOREC aims to promote the Barb horse as a global ambassador for Moroccan equestrian practices.

A sport horse breeding operation was set up in Sidi Beroussii in 1985, to obtain the Moroccan Sport Horse.

The country has five national stud farms, located in Marrakesh, Meknes, Bouznika, Oujda and El Jadida, managed by SOREC. The Bouznika stud is home to the Royal Family's Arabian horses. Morocco also boasts some excellent private stud farms. The use of artificial insemination is growing, particularly in remote areas.

== Events ==
Morocco organizes numerous equestrian events. The most important is the Salon international du cheval d'El Jadida, created in 2008, which attracted 230,000 visitors, according to its organizers, for its 2018 edition. Since 2011, SOREC has organized international meetings for Barb and Arab-Barb horses, with the aim of promoting these two national breeds.

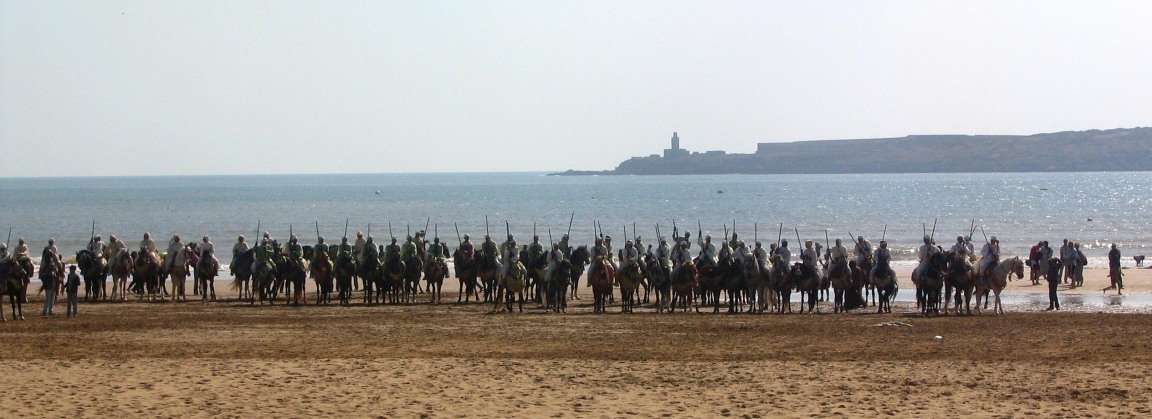
Berber tbourida riders preparing on the beach at Essaouira.

The Morocco Royal Tour, an international show jumping competition created in 2010 on the instructions of His Majesty Mohammed VI, was upgraded from 3-star to 4-star status in 2018.

The Rabat Horse Week (Oussbouou lfarass) brings together Morocco's top national riders every July.

== Culture ==
Moroccan equestrian practices and history have inspired many artists, in particular Eugène Delacroix, who painted Exercices militaires des Marocains in 1832, Le Kaïd, chef marocain in 1837, Le Sultan du Maroc in 1845 and Chevaux sortant de la mer in 1860; but also Salvador Dalí, with La Bataille de Tétouan, painted in 1961–1962.

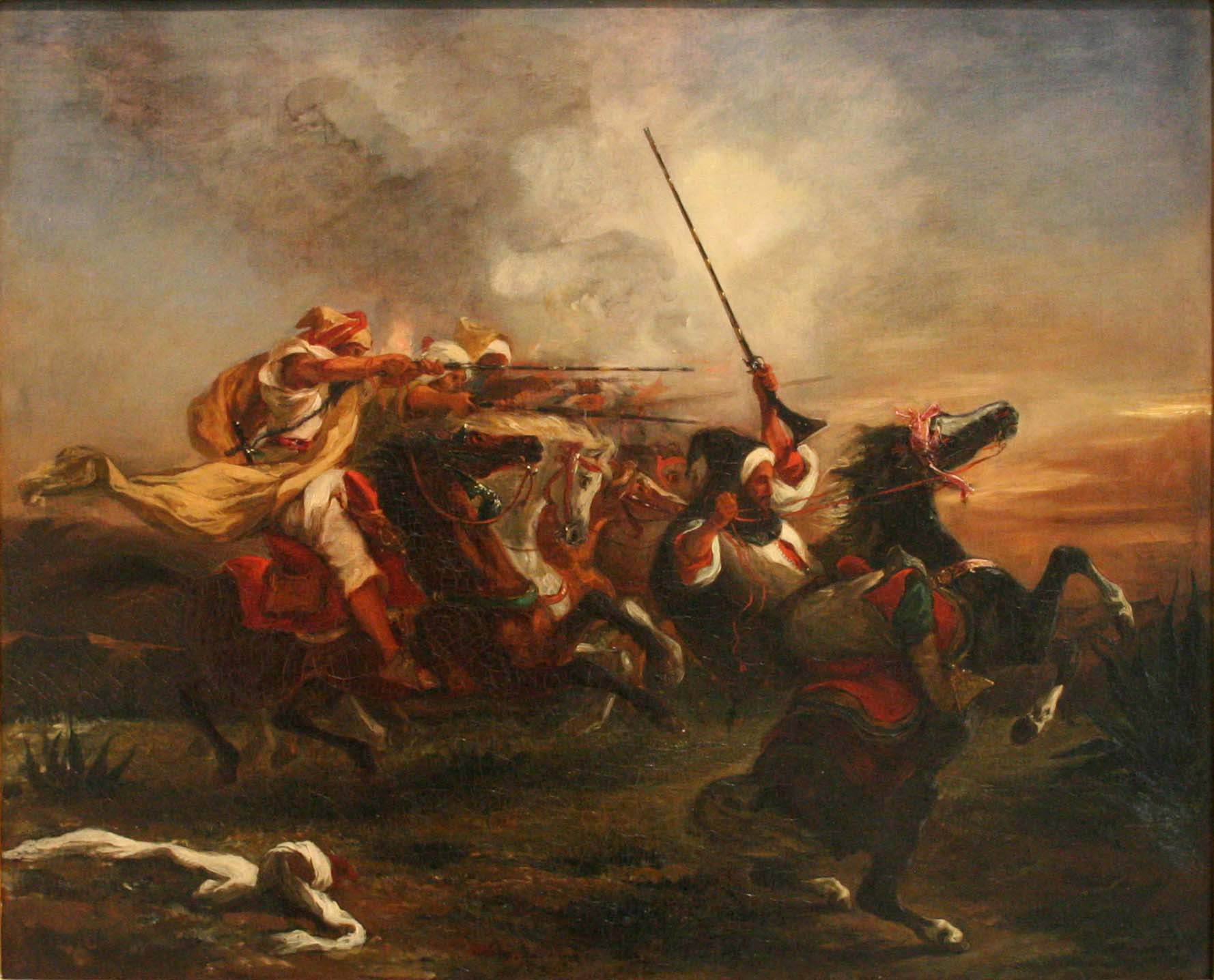
Exercices militaires des Marocains, Eugène Delacroix, 1832.

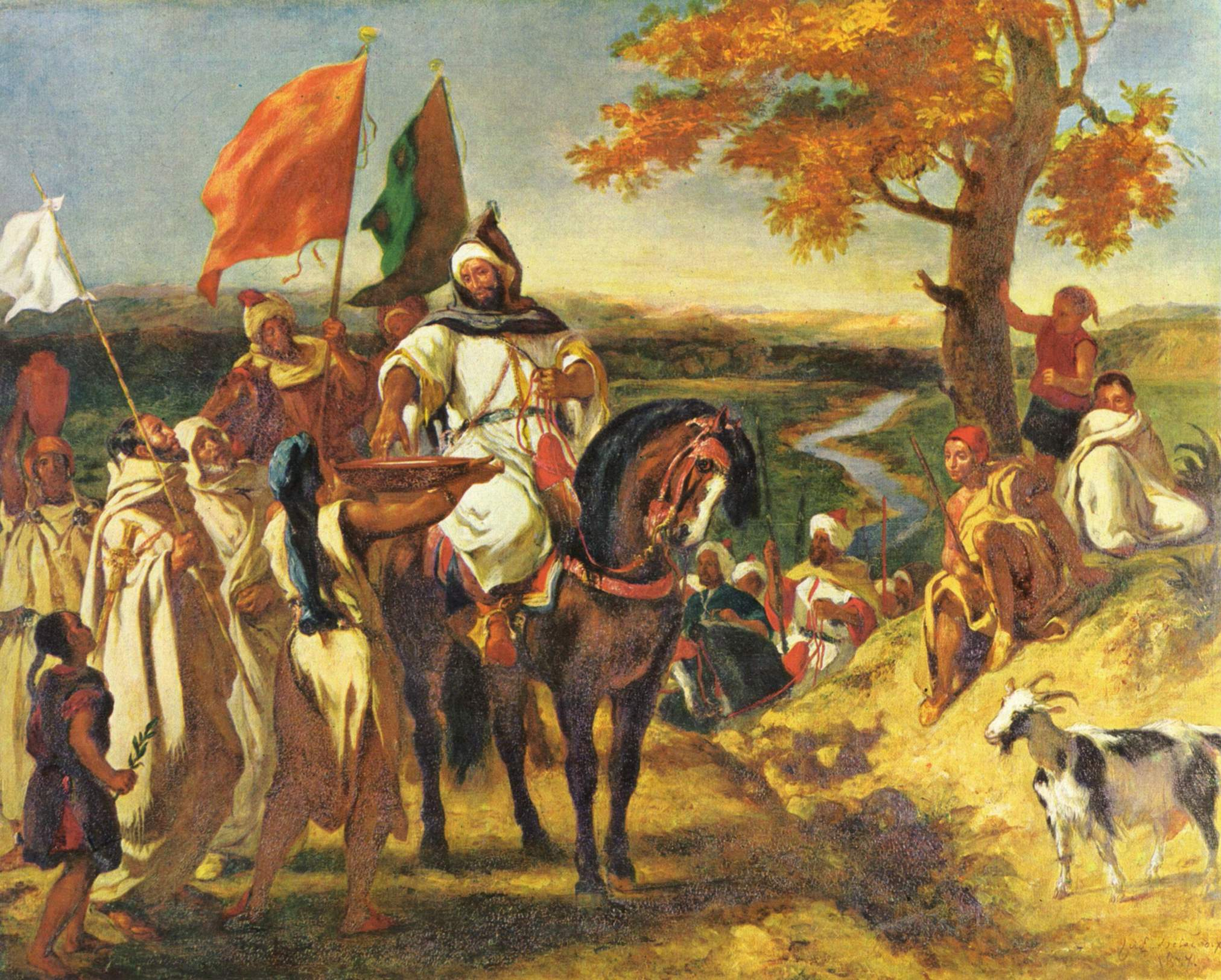
Le Kaïd, chef marocain, Eugène Delacroix, 1837.

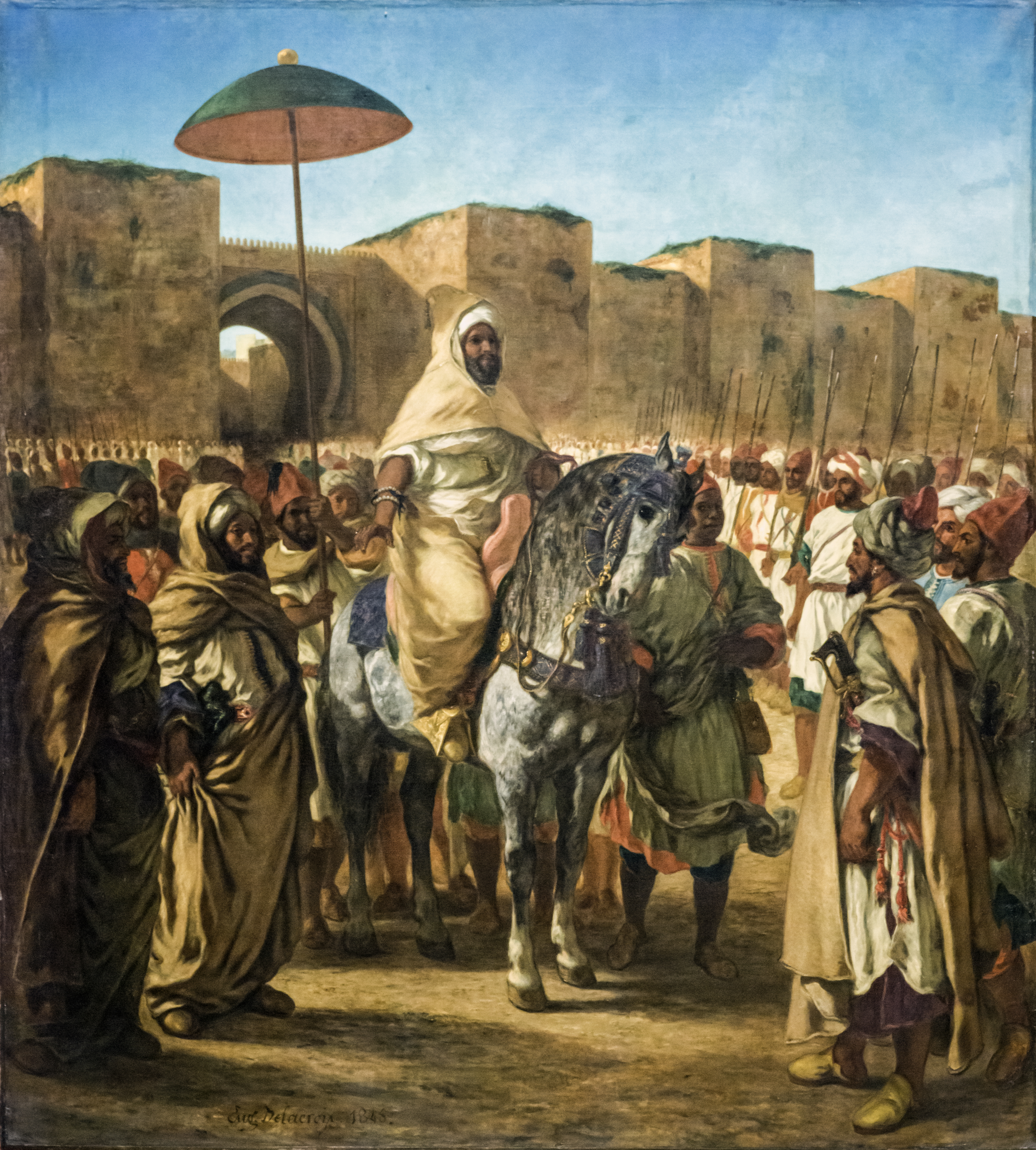
Le Sultan du Maroc, Eugène Delacroix, 1845.

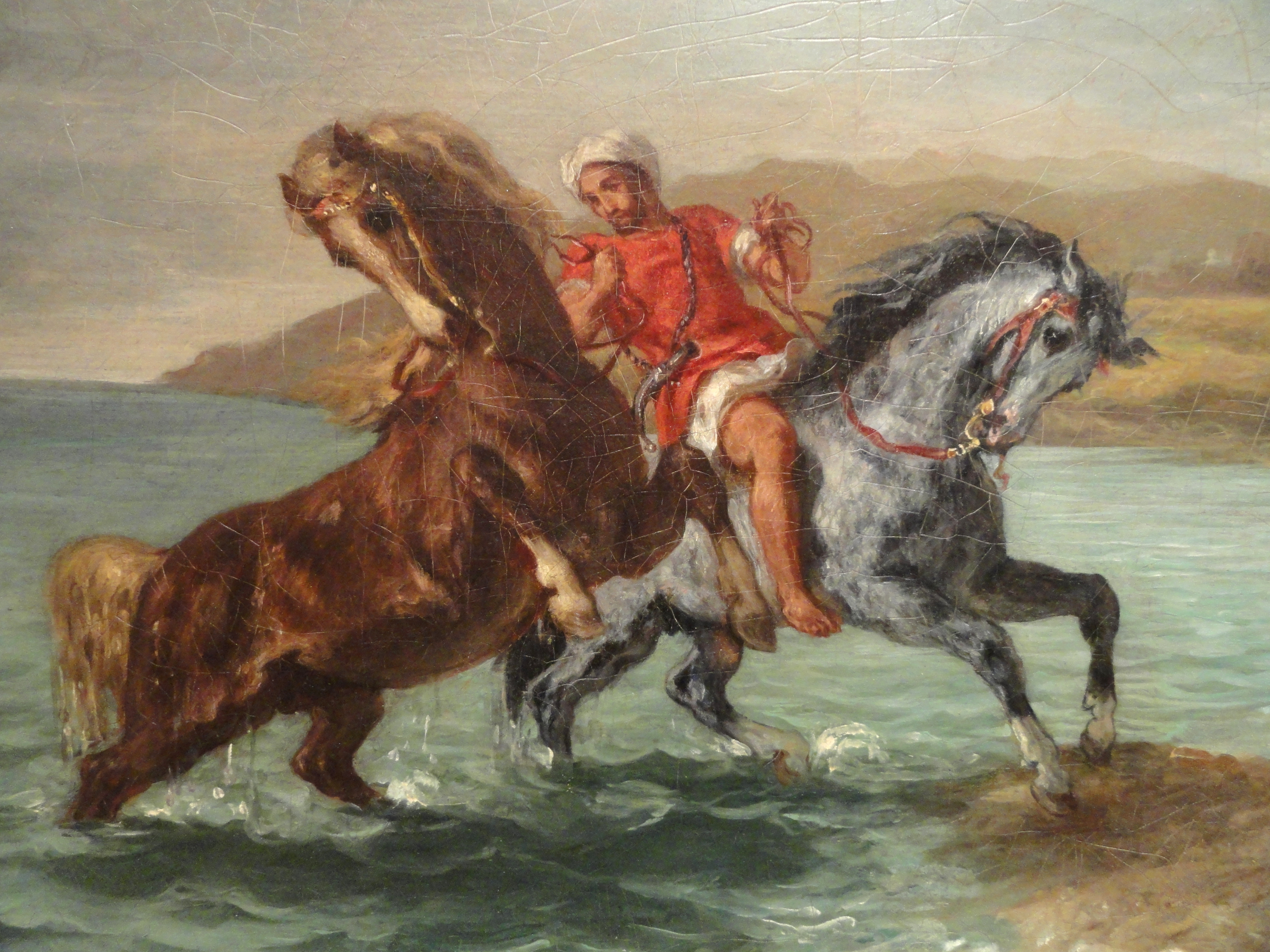
Chevaux sortant de la mer, Eugène Delacroix, 1860.

== See also ==
- Tbourida

== Bibliography ==
=== Books ===
- Barbié de Préaudeau, Philippe (2002). Le Cheval arabe (in French) (2nd ed.). Les éditions du Jaguar. ISBN 2-86950-358-X.
- Hossaini-Hilali, Jamal (2012). La recherche vétérinaire sur le cheval au Maroc : Répertoire des travaux scientifiques de 1913 à 2011 (in French). Jamal Hossaini-Hilali. ISBN 978-9954-31-274-2.

=== Articles ===
- Talley, Gwyneth (2020). Human-Horse Relationships in Morocco: what Equids Can Tell Us About Society (in French). Hesperis Tamuda.
- Le Brech, Catherine (2018). Au Maroc, la filière du cheval monte en gamme (in French). Franceinfo.
- Libbrecht, Xavier (2014). Derrière Kebir Ouaddar c'est tout le Maroc qui galope (in French). La Revue.
- Mayrand, Lise (2014). Le Maroc, de la tbourida au CSO (in French). Cheval Magazine.
- Rousseau, Élise (2014). Tous les chevaux du monde (in French). Delachaux et Niestlé. ISBN 978-2-603-01865-1.
- Sylla, Adama (2017). La filière équine prend du galon (in French). Challenge.
- Vagnozzi, Catherine (2014). Abdelkebir Ouddar, Morocco to bois le Roi (in French). Equestrio.
