= Kheir (horse) =

Algerian horse gifted to French President Nicolas Sarkozy

Kheir (خير)
- Sex: Male
- Born: Kheir; February 19, 2004; Algeria

Kheir is a gray Barb horse, born in 2004 at the National Stud of Chaouchaoua in Algeria, and then given as a diplomatic gift to the French President Nicolas Sarkozy in 2007. He was subsequently sent to the National Stud of Les Bréviaires in France and trained for equestrian shows.

== History ==
Kheir was born on February 19, 2004, at the National Stud of Chaouchaoua. He was then gifted by the President of Algeria, Abdelaziz Bouteflika, to the President of France, Nicolas Sarkozy, presumably on December 5, 2007, after his visit to Algiers. Since 2008, when he was 3 years old, Kheir has been housed at the National Stud of Les Bréviaires. According to Jean-Louis Gouraud, he contracted equine viral arteritis the same year, which led to his castration. However, the French Institute of the Horse and Riding indicates that he has sired 7 foals born between 2011 and 2013.

At Les Bréviaires, Kheir was trained for equestrian shows by Loïs Bourdais, who is in charge of the show activities at the stud. The horse garnered a certain curiosity during his performances. According to Libération, the Élysée Palace censored the promotional brochure for the 2010 edition of the Paris Horse Show, which featured a burlesque show titled "Les pitreries du cheval du président" (The Antics of the President's Horse), showcasing Kheir. Instead, they only mentioned a liberty dressage show without specifying the connection between the president and the horse. This operation apparently cost tens of thousands of euros to the Élysée Palace. As of 2013, Kheir had never been visited by his French owner, but one of Nicolas Sarkozy's sons reportedly came to see him.

As of 2021, Kheir is still alive and participating in shows at the National Stud of Le Pin. The following year, he was housed at the National Stud of Pompadour.

== Description ==
According to various press sources, Kheir is described as being of Barb breed, Arab breed, or a cross between Arab-Barb breeds. However, his registered pedigree indicates that he is a Barb horse. He has a gray coat and stands at a height of 1.55 meters.

According to Loïs Bourdais, Kheir has a strong and determined character but is also mischievous and playful.
