= Abdelkebir Ouaddar =

Moroccan equestrian

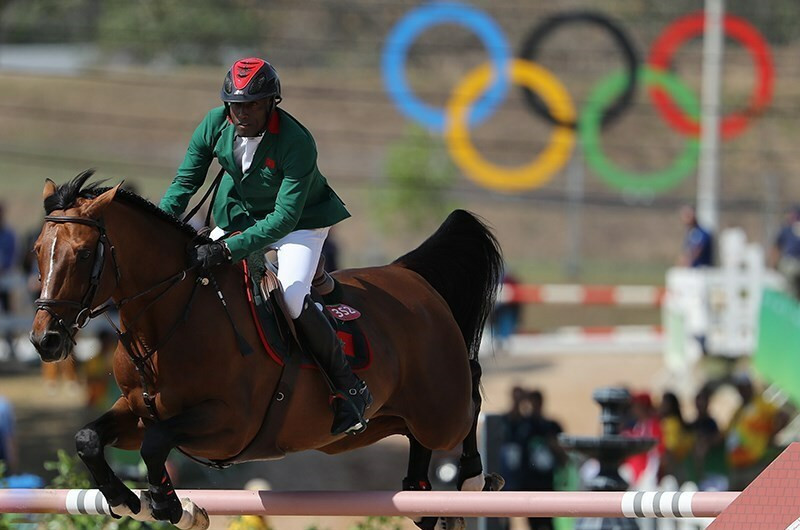
- Ouaddar riding Quickly de Kreisker at the 2016 Summer Olympics

Personal information
- Born: 15 July 1962 (age 64) Aït Ourir, Morocco
- Height: 174 cm (5 ft 9 in)
- Weight: 67 kg (148 lb)
Medal record
Equestrian
Representing Morocco
Mediterranean Games
Bronze medal – third place	2026 Taranto	Team jumping

Abdelkebir Ouaddar (Arabic: عبد الكبير ودار, born 15 July 1962) is a Moroccan equestrian. He competed at the 2016 Summer Olympics in the individual jumping event, where he tied for 50th place. He was the flag-bearer for Morocco at the Parade of Nations.

Ouaddar also participated at the 2014 World Equestrian Games in Normandy, France, where he placed 13th individually and 27th teamwise.

He competed at the 2020 Summer Olympics.

== See also ==
- Quickly de Kreisker (Abdelkebir's show jumping horse)
- Horses in Morocco

Olympic Games
Preceded by Adam Lamhamedi	Flagbearer for Morocco; Rio de Janeiro 2018	Succeeded by Samir Azzimani
