= Quickly de Kreisker =

French show jumping stallion

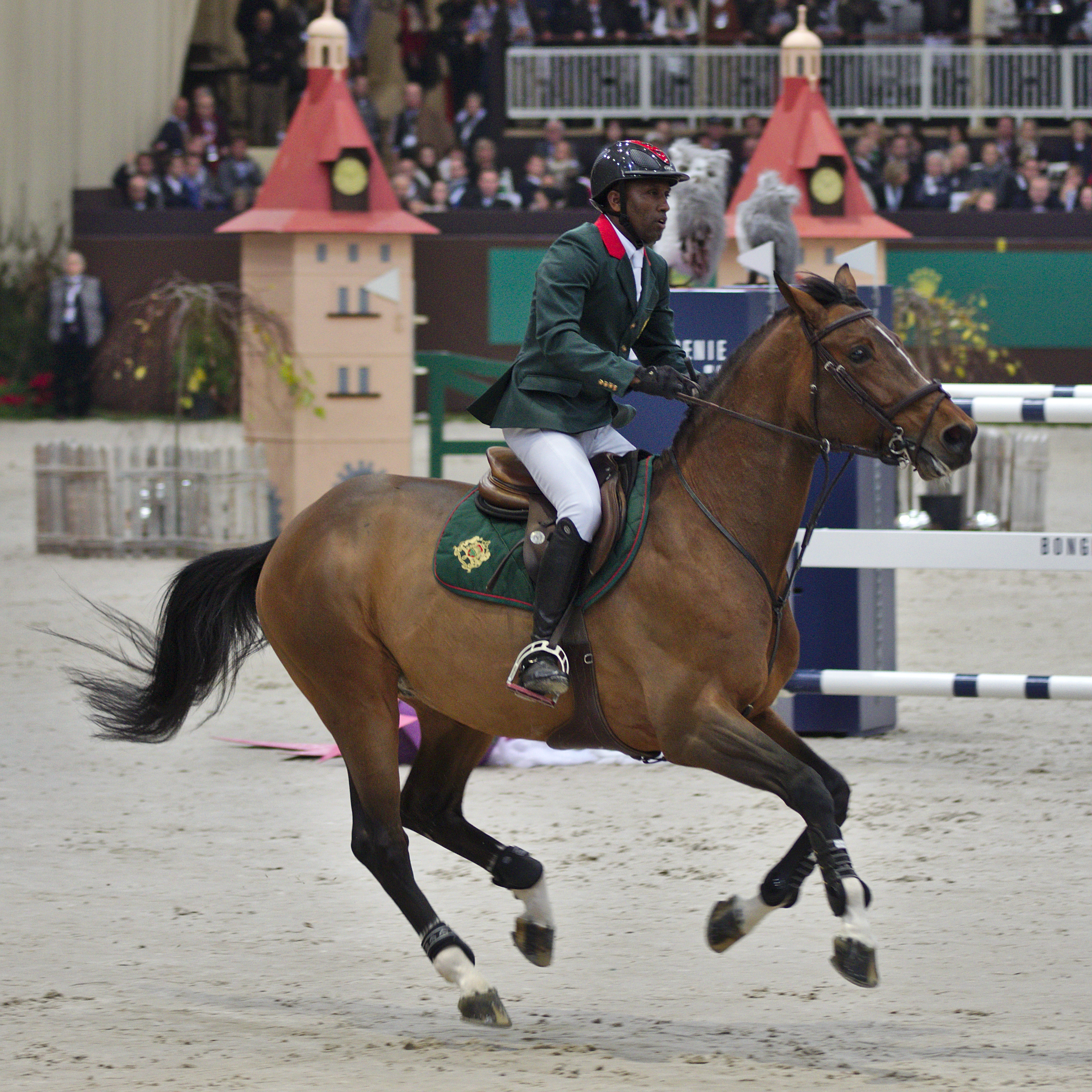
- Breed: Selle français
- Sire: Diamant de Semilly
- Dam: Briseis d'Helby
- Sex: Male
- Color: Bay
- Owner: Mohammed VI

Quickly de Kreisker is a Selle Français show jumping stallion born on February 5, 2004, at a stud in Finistère. Sired by Diamant de Semilly and Briseis d'Helby by Laudanum, he was sold by the Fences agency as a two-year-old. He spent several years in France on the classic cycle, trained by Benjamin Robert and Bruno Souloumiac's Breton stables. At the end of 2012, King Mohammed VI of Morocco bought him under Marcel Rozier's supervision, and entrusted him to Abdelkebir Ouaddar, a Moroccan rider.

The pair, trained by Rozier in the Paris region, proved to be an excellent match. Quickly de Kreisker reached the highest level, with "dazzling" progress in 2013 and 2014. In particular, he took second place at Jumping International de France, and the Morocco Royal Tour two years running. Quickly de Kreisker was regularly No. 1 in the world jumping horse rankings at the start of the 2014 and 2015 seasons, but stayed away from the showgrounds in subsequent years.

Highly appreciated by both French and Moroccan audiences, he is officially retired on December 20, 2020.

== History ==
=== Birth and weaning ===
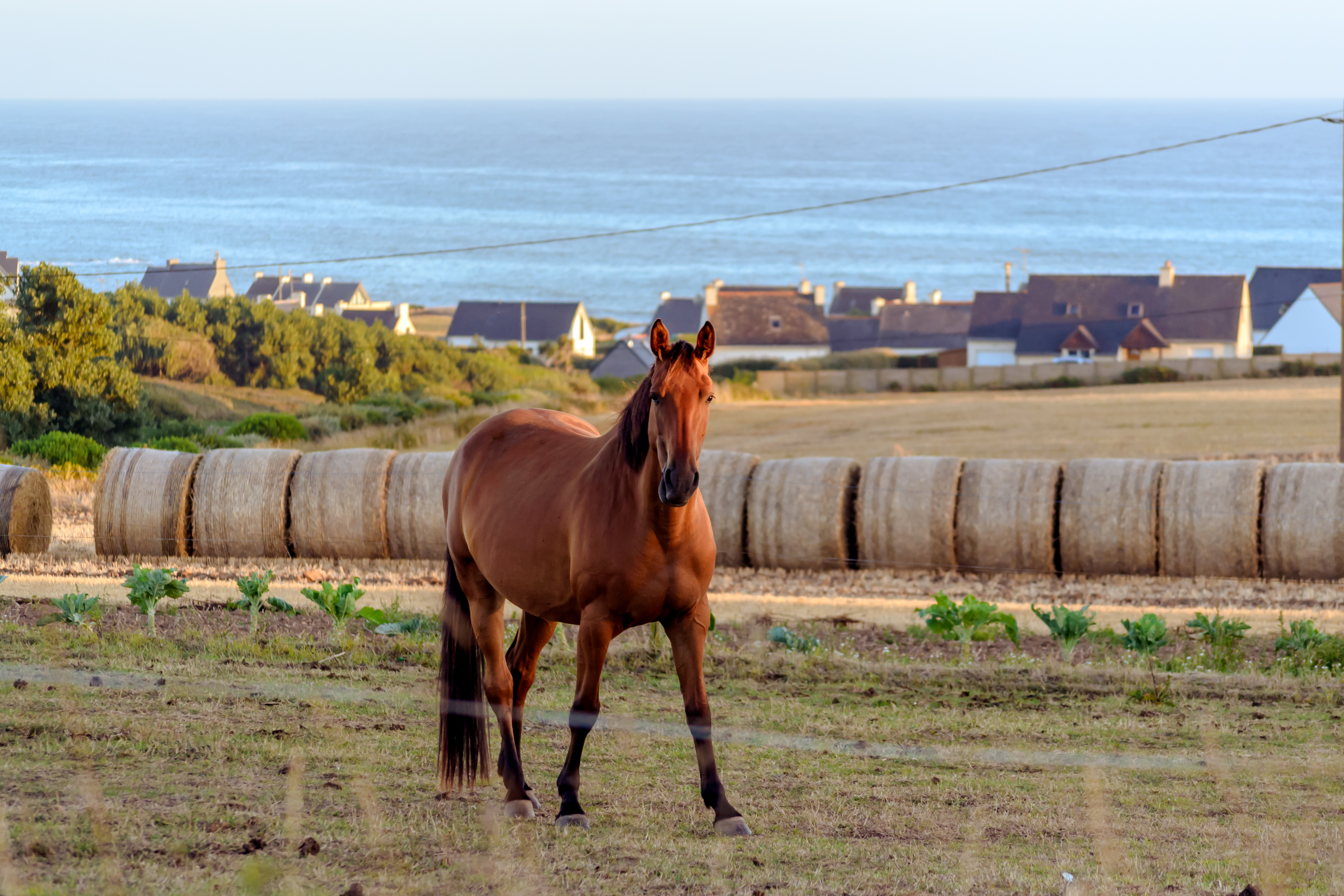
The Kreisker stud farm in Plozévet.

Quickly was born on February 5, 2004, at Guillaume Ansquer's stud in Plozévet, Finistère. According to his breeder, he was "a perfectly normal foal" at birth. He is an "SFA" according to the Selle Français studbook, meaning he is the offspring of two Selle Français horses with no foreign bloodlines. His dam, Briseis, was acquired by his breeder as part of a downsizing at the Helby stud. Quickly is the first foal from this breeding farm, from which he takes his name: Kéringard Kreisker, "the last breeding farm in the West before America", where around twenty foals are born each year. He is sold at weaning at the age of six months, for the sum of 20,000 euros. In the end, the Ansquer family, who bred him, knew little about him. It was Albert Lamotte who bought him.

=== Early years ===
Albert Lamotte presented Quickly at the Fences sales at the age of two. He was bought by Liliane Fromer of the Blés breeding farm at Hurbache in the Vosges and by an Italian buyer, for the total sum of 60,000 euros. At the age of three, his owners entrusted him to Bruno Souloumiac's Breton stables, who took him through the classic show jumping cycle from age four to six. Each time, he qualifies for the final at Fontainebleau. At the age of five, Quickly made a brief stop at the Haras de Hus, where he was ridden by Thomas Rousseau. At the age of six, the young stallion began to make a name for himself, and offers to buy him came thick and fast. Liliane Fromer bought out all Quickly's shares, making her the sole owner at the age of seven. Quickly did not take part in the final of the classic cycle at Fontainebleau that year, as his owner felt he was not ready. He did, however, go to Lanaken, where he made a strong impression thanks to his mastery of the triple jump. Quickly visits a variety of showgrounds, including Dinard and Chantilly.

He was mainly trained by rider Benjamin Robert, originally from the South-West of France but now working in Brittany, from the age of four to eight. He then moved to the Helby breeding farm in Betton, Ille-et-Vilaine. The year he turned eight was the year of his revelation in the world of breeding. He took part in his first CSI (Concours de saut internationaux) and the World Young Horse Championships in Lanaken, reaching the final. During the season, he scored four victories, including the 3-star International Jumping Competition - CSI3* in Dinard, which Benjamin Robert considers to be his greatest victory and best memory. It was during this competition that Moroccan rider Abdelkebir Ouaddar spotted Quickly. Quickly's most recent victories under the saddle of rider Benjamin Robert for his Breton stables were the 2-star international jumping competition - CSI2* in Auvers and the CSI3* in Caen, on October 21, 2012.

=== A move to Morocco ===
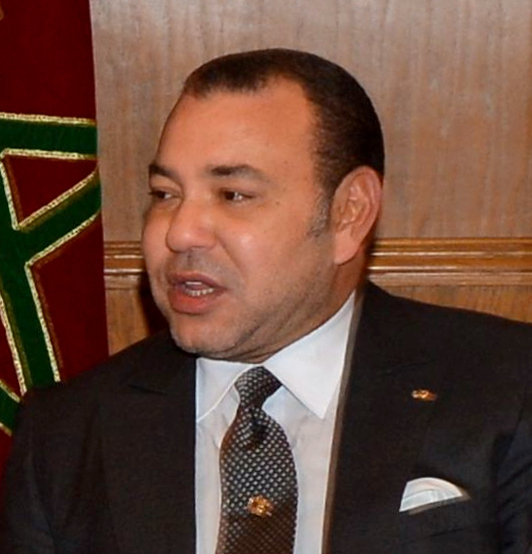
King Mohammed VI of Morocco, current owner of Quickly de Kreisker.

Abdelkebir Ouaddar mentions Quickly to his trainer, Marcel Rozier, who arranges a trial under the supervision of Moulay Abdellah Alaoui, President of the Royal Moroccan Equestrian Federation. Abdelkebir is won over by the trial. The Frenchman Marcel Rozier oversees the transaction with Bruno Souloumiac's stable on behalf of the Royal Moroccan Mare, in his opinion being discreet and faster than the competition. As part of exchanges between the Brittany region and Morocco, King Mohammed VI became the new owner of Quickly de Kreisker, officially entrusting him to Moroccan rider Abdelkebir Ouaddar at the end of 2012. Abdelkebir says he fell in love with Quickly as soon as he saw him.

Quickly and Abdelkebir are trained at Bois-le-Roi by Marcel Rozier. They also benefit from the financial and logistical support of the Moroccan royal family. Within a year and a half, this couple, unknown on the sporting scene, had risen to the level of the world's best. Quickly's exceptional abilities and Marcel Rozier's training program are cited among the reasons for Abdelkebir Ouaddar's success.

=== 2012 and 2013 seasons ===
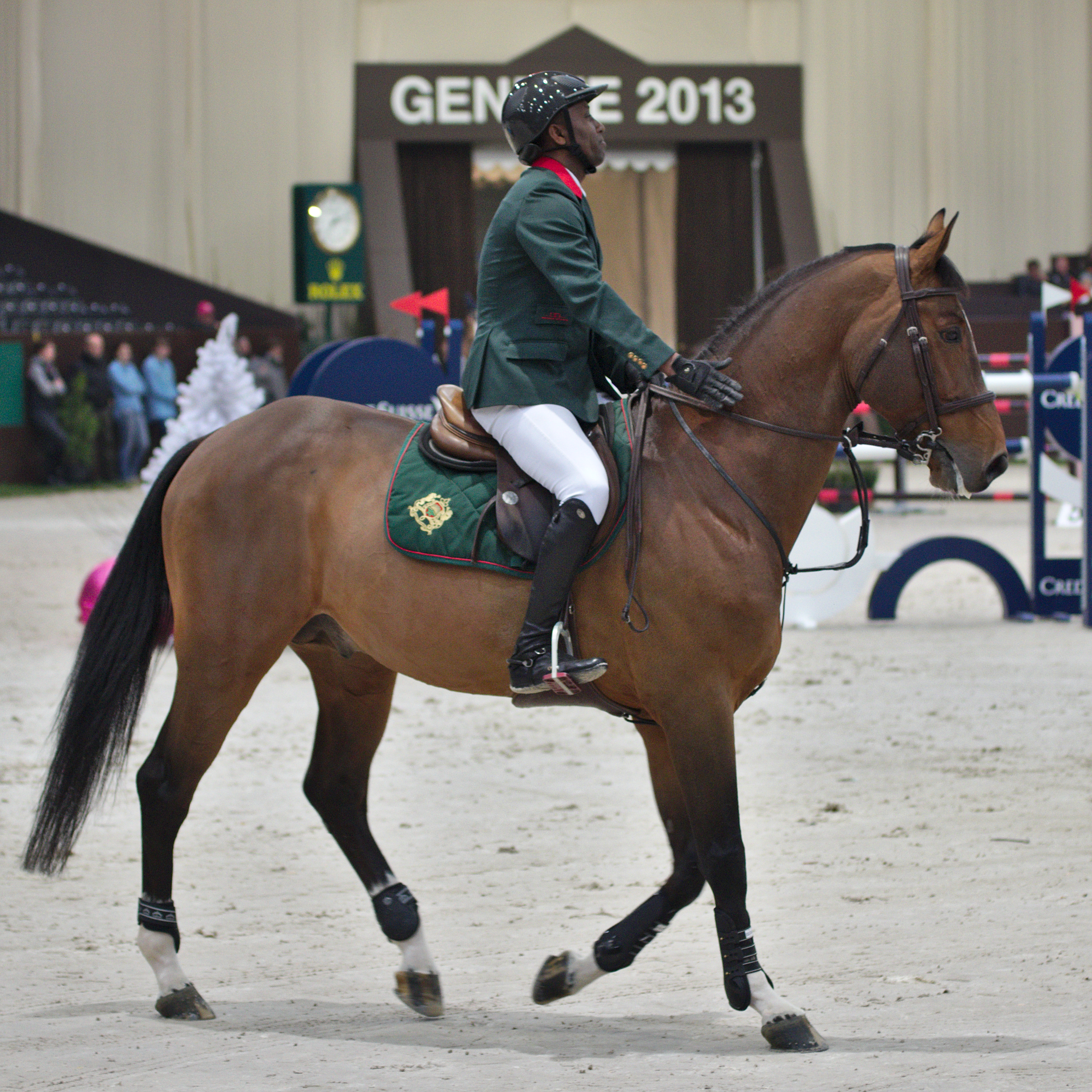
Abdelkebir Ouaddar and Quickly de Kreisker at CHI Geneva 2013.

In October 2012, the new pair made their first, unsuccessful attempt at the Equita'Lyon 5-star international jumping competition - CSI5*: Quickly had only changed riders a week earlier and was taking part in his first indoor competition. After a somewhat difficult start and a change of net, "Abdelkebir and Quickly have developed an extraordinary understanding and symbiosis". The pair's rise proved to be "meteoric", as in the space of a year and a half they went from being unknowns in equestrian sports to the world's show jumping elite.

They were highly acclaimed at the Gucci Paris Masters in the Speed Challenge at the end of November 2012. The Sunshine Tour in Vejer de la Frontera in March 2013 is their first Grand Prix win. For the occasion, Abdelkebir rides with a small Pelham bit. He receives congratulations from French rider Michel Robert, who sees Quickly as a "crack". The pair qualify for the 2014 World Equestrian Games later in the year. They open the CSI5* Masters in Stuttgart in November. This victory puts the competition organizers in a quandary, as they had not anticipated the victory of a Moroccan rider. The Moroccan national anthem and flag were slow to appear. On December 6, 2013, Quickly and Abdelkebir completed an impressive run at the Gucci Masters, finishing 3rd in the GDE prize.

=== 2014 season ===
Quickly is the best Selle Français on the circuit over the winter-spring 2013-2014 season. On February 9, 2014, he won his first CSI5* Grand Prix at Al Ain, with his rider. He became the world show jumping revelation of the year and the best horse throughout the early part of the season, winning in particular the Grand Prix du Touquet and a second place at the official 5-star international jumping competition - CSIO5* de La Baule. Abdelkebir Ouaddar comments that he "played it safe" rather than the stopwatch at La Baule.

During the 2014 World Equestrian Games, Quickly made a mistake when crossing the river during the first round of the show jumping competition. As a result, the couple loses any chance of a medal.

=== 2015 season ===
Quickly and Kebir easily win the CSI3* in Al Ain, in February, with a seven-second time advantage over the runner-up. They also won the CSI5* Al Shaqab in Doha in March, two seconds ahead of the world's #1 rider, Scott Brash. He finished second in the Chantilly Global Champions Tour event in July. Victories at the end of 2014 and the beginning of 2015 once again lifted Quickly de Kreisker to the top of the World Breeding Federation for Sport Horses (WBFSH) rankings in April 2015, and thus to the status of the world's best show jumping horse. As the stallion was only 11 years old in 2015, he is still "on the rise".

=== 2016 and 2017 seasons ===
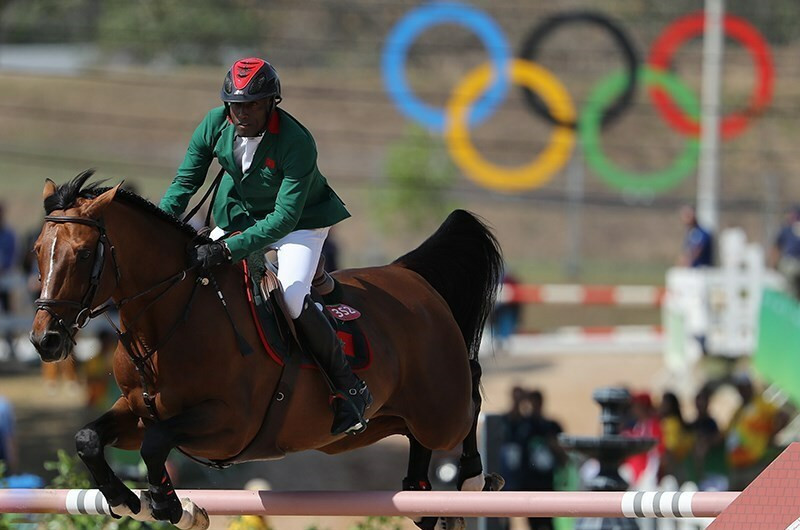
Ouaddar and Quickly de Kreisker in the Olympic show jumping competition.

Quickly wins the Hermès jump in March 2016. At the start of the Rio Olympics, a Qatari emir offers to buy him for 16 million euros. Abdelkebir Ouaddar turned down the offer, declaring that the King's horse was not for sale. The stallion is placed under close surveillance, watched over by experienced guards.

Injured, Quickly is rested from March to autumn 2017. He does not return to the competition arena.

== Description ==
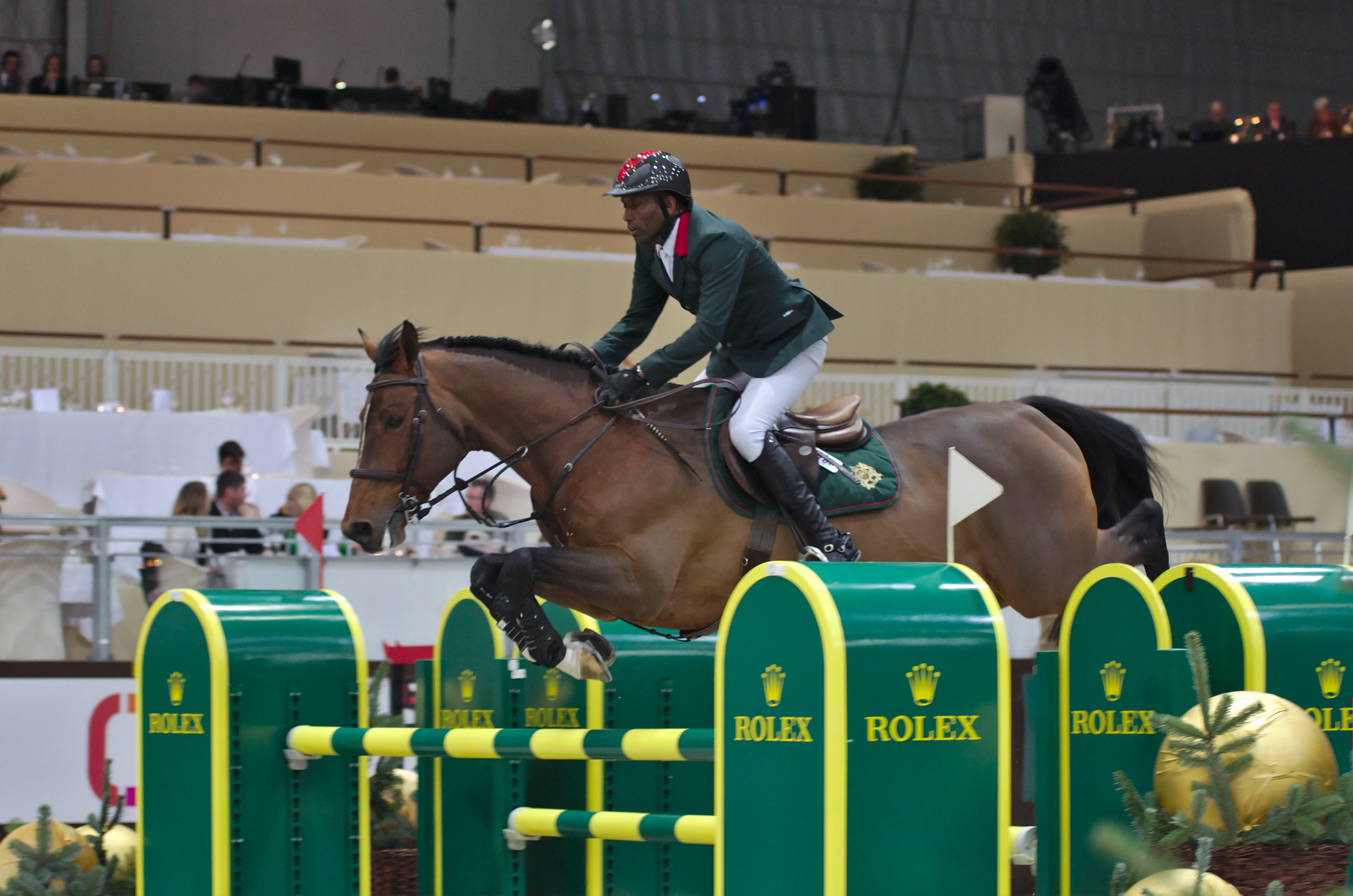
Abdelkebir Ouaddar and Quickly de Kreisker at CHI Geneva 2013.

At 1.65 m, Quickly is a rather small stallion for show jumping: Abdelkebir calls him "my double pony" because of his size and modest appearance. Although he may seem to lack strength and ability at first glance, Quickly makes up for it with a powerful hock, great suppleness and real intelligence on the bars. His coat is bay.

Quickly has the reputation of being a nervous and very expressive stallion in competition. He leaves no one indifferent, especially his rider. Described as an "exceptional horse" for his "particular character" by veterinarian Dr. Sandrine Serfati, he is gifted with exceptional physical aptitudes combined with great intelligence. His temperament is whimsical, notably in his habit of rushing between obstacles (or even between each obstacle), unlike most competition horses, which are calmer. For his rider Abdelkebir Ouaddar, "it's fun for him to buck. It's also his way of saying hello to the public. Abdelkebir believes that Quickly is a genius with the character of a star, wants to share his joy of being with spectators and loves encouragement. When put to work, he proves to be quite available and cooperative, placing a great deal of trust in his rider. The stallion has difficulty with mouthpiece constraints, and dislikes bits and nosebands that close his mouth. Outside the show ring, his character is quite different, showing great calm. His breeder Guillaume Ansquer testifies that he was a very gentle and respectful foal with a lot of energy and chic, qualities he kept by remaining a whole horse.

== Results ==
Quickly de Kreisker finished 76th in the SHF Cycle Classique Championship for four-year-olds at the Grande Semaine de Fontainebleau, ridden by Benjamin Robert. In his fifth year, with Thomas Rousseau, he won the Grand Critérium SHF for five-year-olds, finishing 19th among competitors of his generation. In his sixth year, again with Benjamin Robert, he won the Cycle Classique 8 times, finishing 8th in the Championship and 24th in the Grand Critérium.

In 2013 and 2014, Quickly de Kreisker won the Morocco Royal Tour. He became the world's No. 1 show jumping horse in the WBFSH rankings in July 2014, a position he lost and then regained for the period from October 1, 2014, to March 31, 2015.

=== 2012 ===
- July: 1st in the 1.50 m CSI3* at Dinard
- August: 8th in the 1.45 m CSI3* in Royan
- November: 4th in the CSI2* 1.45 m Grand Prix in Strazeele

=== 2013 ===
- March: 2nd in the CSI2* in Oliva
- May: 3rd in the CSI3* at Le Touquet
- June: 5th in the CSI4* at Franconville
- July: 1st in the CSI3* GP in Vichy
- October: Winner of the 4th Morocco Royal Tour
- November: Winner of the 1.50 m opening event at the CSI5* Masters in Stuttgart

=== 2014 ===
He was 6th in the WBFSH world ranking of show jumping horses in October 2014.

- January: 1st in the CSI3*-W Grand Prix in Sharjah
- February: 1st in the CSIO5* Grand Prix in Al Ain
- May: 1st in the CSI3* in Le Touquet (1.55 m)
- May: 1st in the Prix du Conseil Général de Loire Atlantique (1.55 m) and 2nd in the Grand Prix (CSIO5*) at the Jumping International de France in La Baule-Escoublac
- July: 2nd in the Prix RMC, CSI3* at Paris Eiffel Jumping
- August: 1st in the Grand prix 1.50 m, CSI3* Mâcon-Chaintré
- October: 1st in the CSI3* in Tétouan (Morocco Royal Tour event)
- October: 1st in the CSI3* in Rabat (Morocco Royal Tour event)
- October: 2nd in the CSI3* in El Jadida (Morocco Royal Tour event)
- Winner of the 5th Morocco Royal Tour

=== 2015 ===
He is 6th in the WBFSH world ranking of show jumping horses, established in October 2015.

- February: 1st in the CSI3* in Al Ain
- March: 1st in the CSI5* Al Shaqab in Doha
- July: 2nd in the CSI5* Chantilly, France

== Origins ==
Quickly de Kreisker is a Selle Français A, which means he has no foreign bloodlines among his ancestors. Often referred to as a "Breton horse", he was indeed born in Brittany, but the genetic origins of his ancestors lie more in Normandy. While the quality of his paternal line by Diamant de Semilly is well known, his maternal origins are also exceptional, since crosses with the Laudanum line have produced numerous international champions. The Kreisker stud is renowned for its attention to maternal lines. Briseis is a descendant of Son Altesse (1940), a mare who left her mark on Selle Français maternal lines.

Pedigree of Quickly de Kreisker (2004)
Sire Diamant de Semilly (1991-2022)	Le Tot de Semilly (1977-2008)	Grand Veneur (1972-1988)	Amour du Bois (1966-1979)
Sire Diamant de Semilly (1991-2022)	Le Tot de Semilly (1977-2008)	Grand Veneur (1972-1988)	Tanagra (1963)
Sire Diamant de Semilly (1991-2022)	Le Tot de Semilly (1977-2008)	Venue du Tot (1965)	Juriste (1953)
Sire Diamant de Semilly (1991-2022)	Le Tot de Semilly (1977-2008)	Venue du Tot (1965)	Relique (1961)
Sire Diamant de Semilly (1991-2022)	Venise des Cresles (1987-1991)	Elf III (1970-1991)	Ibrahim (1952-1973)
Sire Diamant de Semilly (1991-2022)	Venise des Cresles (1987-1991)	Elf III (1970-1991)	Osyris (1958)
Sire Diamant de Semilly (1991-2022)	Venise des Cresles (1987-1991)	Miss des Cresles (1978-1989)	Amarpour (1966)
Sire Diamant de Semilly (1991-2022)	Venise des Cresles (1987-1991)	Miss des Cresles (1978-1989)	Urlurette (1964)
Dam Briseis d'Helby (1989)	Laudanum (1967-1996)	Boran (1960)	Mourne (1954)
Dam Briseis d'Helby (1989)	Laudanum (1967-1996)	Boran (1960)	Bethora (1951)
Dam Briseis d'Helby (1989)	Laudanum (1967-1996)	Monta Bella (1961)	Montaval (1953-1965)
Dam Briseis d'Helby (1989)	Laudanum (1967-1996)	Monta Bella (1961)	Cecropia (1955)
Dam Briseis d'Helby (1989)	Nika du Nevada (1979)	Ecuyer I (1970-1986)	Tanael (1963-1981)
Dam Briseis d'Helby (1989)	Nika du Nevada (1979)	Ecuyer I (1970-1986)	Vive étoile (1965)
Dam Briseis d'Helby (1989)	Nika du Nevada (1979)	Danae (1969)	Starter (1962)
Dam Briseis d'Helby (1989)	Nika du Nevada (1979)	Danae (1969)	Magali (1956)

== Recognition ==
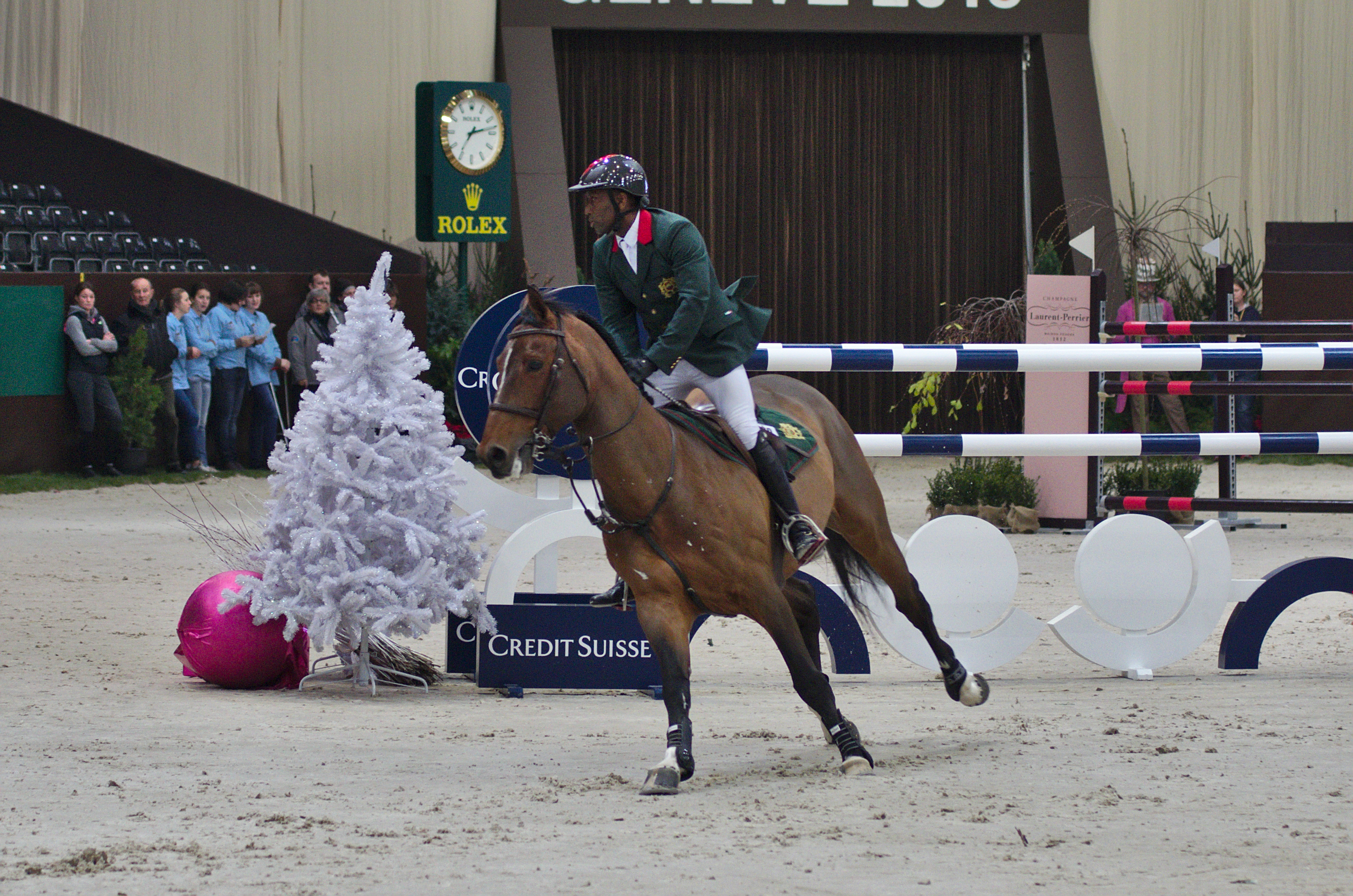
Abdelkebir Ouaddar and Quickly de Kreisker at CHI Geneva 2013.

Quickly is much loved by the Moroccan and French public alike, certainly due to his Breton origins. In fact, he's nicknamed "le crack de Plozévet" in Brittany. He is considered the leading horse of the Selle Français studbook in 2015.

According to his breeder Guillaume Ansquer, "he brings happiness wherever he goes". He has a dedicated page on Facebook. Abdelkebir Ouaddar calls him his "horse of a lifetime". Just before the 2014 World Equestrian Games, Quickly de Kreisker and Abdelkebir Ouaddar formed one of the most closely followed and appreciated equestrian sports couples. Their appearance on a show ring almost always results in a standing ovation, so much so that the speakers at show jumping competitions (of all nations) are obliged to ask the audience to keep the noise down to spare Quickly's ears. His success has raised the profile of Breton and French sport horse breeding, in particular the Danae mare line.

== Breeding ==
Quickly de Kreisker bred in France from 2010 to 2014, but is no longer available for breeding in that country. He started his stallion career rather late, at six years old, to preserve his abilities. His foals are still too young to assess his breeding qualities.

== See also ==
- Selle Français
- Abdelkebir Ouaddar

== Bibliography ==
- Mrani, Omar (2014). Abdelkebir Ouaddar, l'homme qui murmurait à l'oreille des chevaux (in French). Version Homme.
- Libbrecht, Xavier (2014). Derrière Kebir Ouaddar, c'est tout le Maroc qui galope (in French). La Revue.
- Godfroy, Daphné; Verrier, Marc (2014). Quickly, le joyau de la couronne marocaine (PDF) (in French). Grand Prix magazine.
- Lhermite, Mélina (2015). Quickly de Kreisker, chouchou du public (in French). Cheval Magazine.
- Vagnozzi, Catherine (2014). Abdelkebir Ouddar, Morocco to Bois le Roi (PDF) (in French). Equestrio. Archived from the original (PDF) on 2016-03-03.
