= Arab-Barb =

Horse breed

The Arab-Barb or Arabian-Berber (Arabic: حصان عربي بربري) is a breed of saddle horses originating from the Maghreb. It is the result of crossing the Arab and Barb breeds and shares a common genetic origin with the latter. The first Arab-Barb studbook was created in 1948.

The Arab-Barb is of medium size and has a square build, exhibiting the typical morphology of a saddle horse suited for speed, with a significant chest circumference. It is used primarily for fantasias, as well as for agricultural work and pulling in rural regions of the Maghreb, although this applies mainly to horses with a majority Barb heritage.

The Arab-Barb is a common horse breed throughout North Africa, with an estimated population of around 185,000 in 2010. There is also a small population in Europe.

== Naming ==
This breed is primarily known as "Arab-Barb" in French, whether in Morocco, Algeria, Tunisia, or France, with variations in the use of hyphens and capitalization, such as "Arabe Barbe" and "arabe-barbe." Lætitia Bataille notes that the naming can depend on the genetic origins, using "arabe-barbe" when the Arab heritage is dominant and "barbe-arabe" when the Barb heritage is dominant. However, Elise Rousseau, author of the unreliable Guide Delachaux, uses only the name "barbe-arabe" and considers "arabe-barbe" as a simple synonym. In Chad, the name retained for the breed is "Barbe-Arabe."

In Arabic, the name provided by the Royal Society for the Encouragement of the Horse (SOREC) in Morocco is العريب الرببري (ʿarīb barbarī).

In English, the breed is called "Arabian-Berber" in the CAB International reference work (2016), or "Arab-Barb" in various scientific publications and in Mauritania. In German, its official name is "Araber-Berberpferd," but "Araber-Berber" can also be used.

== History ==
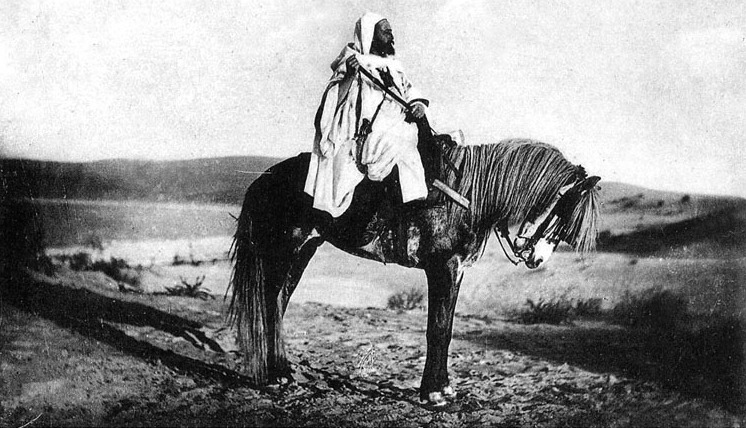
Moroccan rider on his Barb horse.

These horses come from crosses between the Barb, notably Moroccan, and the Arabian. The dendrogram and factorial correspondence analysis between the Barb and the Tunisian Arab-Barb show an overlap in the genetic makeup of the analyzed individuals, confirming a common genetic basis.

The formation of the breed stems from the French colonization of North Africa in the late 19th century when purebred Arabian horses or crosses were mixed with the indigenous Barb. According to veterinarian Dr. Yassine-Hervé Jamali, French breeding agents were concerned about the "degeneration" of the Maghrebi Barb, a well-characterized and differentiated breed from the Arabian in historical documents, and proposed "regenerating" it through crosses with the Arabian.

In Algeria, indigenous Barb mares from Tiaret (in the western part of the country) were crossed with Arabian stallions starting in 1877, with a military objective of "correcting" the morphology of the Barb, which was considered defective. The horses resulting from these crosses then reproduced among themselves.

Algeria was the first country to establish a stud book for the Arab-Barb breed in 1948. The Moroccan stud book for the Arab-Barb was opened the same year. Arab-Barb horses have been presented in Algerian shows since 1975.

== Description ==
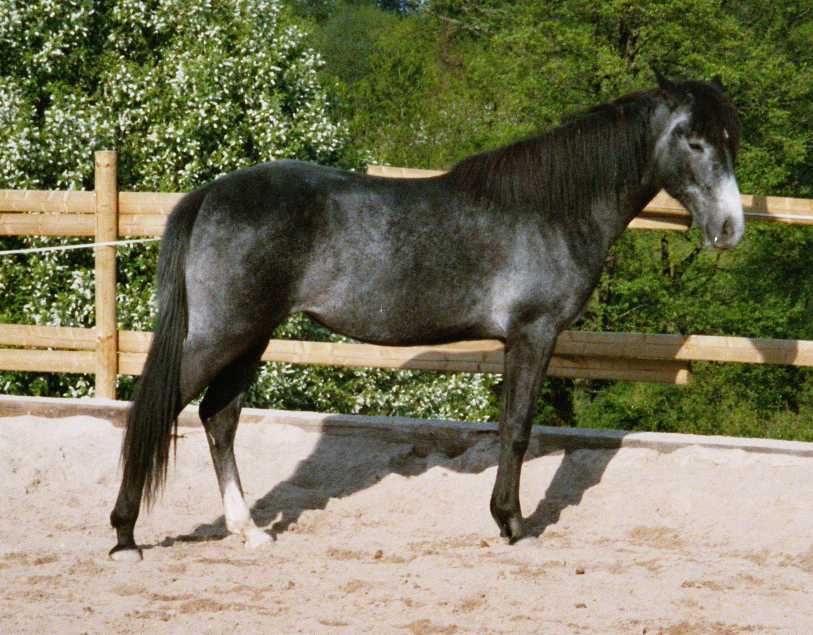
Young gray Arab-Barb.

=== Size and Weight ===
CAB International indicates a size range of 1.52 m to 1.62 m (2016), while the Delachaux Guide indicates 1.40 m to 1.55 m. In Tunisia, the reference measurements recorded in the DAD-IS database are 1.50 m for females and 1.55 m for males. In Chad, the reference measurements are smaller, averaging 1.42 m for females and 1.47 m for males.

In Algeria, a height of 1.55 m is indicated for both males and females. The Arab-Barb of the coastal plains is larger than the one from the high plateaus, which is larger than the one from the desert regions, with the smallest being found in the mountains. The Algerian Arab-Barb is smaller than the Barb, with a smaller cannon circumference. However, it is larger than the Arab-Barb of Morocco and has a larger cannon circumference. Morphometric measurements vary significantly depending on the breeding region.

Birth weight ranges from 60 to 65 kg. In adulthood, the weight ranges from 420 to 450 kg according to the DAD-IS data in Tunisia, and from 400 to 500 kg according to the data from Algeria.

=== Morphology ===
The model is that of a medium-bodied oriental horse. The Arab-Barb is generally larger and sturdier than Arabian horses, with higher hindquarters and feet adapted for speed. The body shape is always "square." The limbs are slender compared to the mass of the horse. The chest circumference is relatively large, which is a necessary quality for a fast saddle horse. The withers height is equal to the croup height, making the Arab-Barb a "horizontal" horse.

The other measurements and morphological characteristics, which vary greatly, depend on the degree of Arab and Barb origins of the animal, with a distinction between three categories: horses with less than 25% Arab origins, horses between 25% and 75%, and horses with over 75% Arab origins. The morphology of the Arab is very different from that of the Barb: the Arab is light, dry, and fine, with a slim and elongated neck, a concave or straight profile, a short tail set high, and a horizontal croup. In contrast, the Barb is thicker, with a wide and thick neck, a convex or straight profile, a long and full tail set low, and a "desk-like" croup. According to SOREC, the head profile of an Arab-Barb is generally straight or slightly concave, the neck has medium mass, and the croup has moderate inclination, with a median tail set.

There are also significant morphological differences between the Arab-Barb of the coastal plains and those of the mountains. Horses from the high plateaus and desert regions are morphologically intermediate between the two.

Mountain horses are more stocky and perceived as less elegant.

=== Coat ===
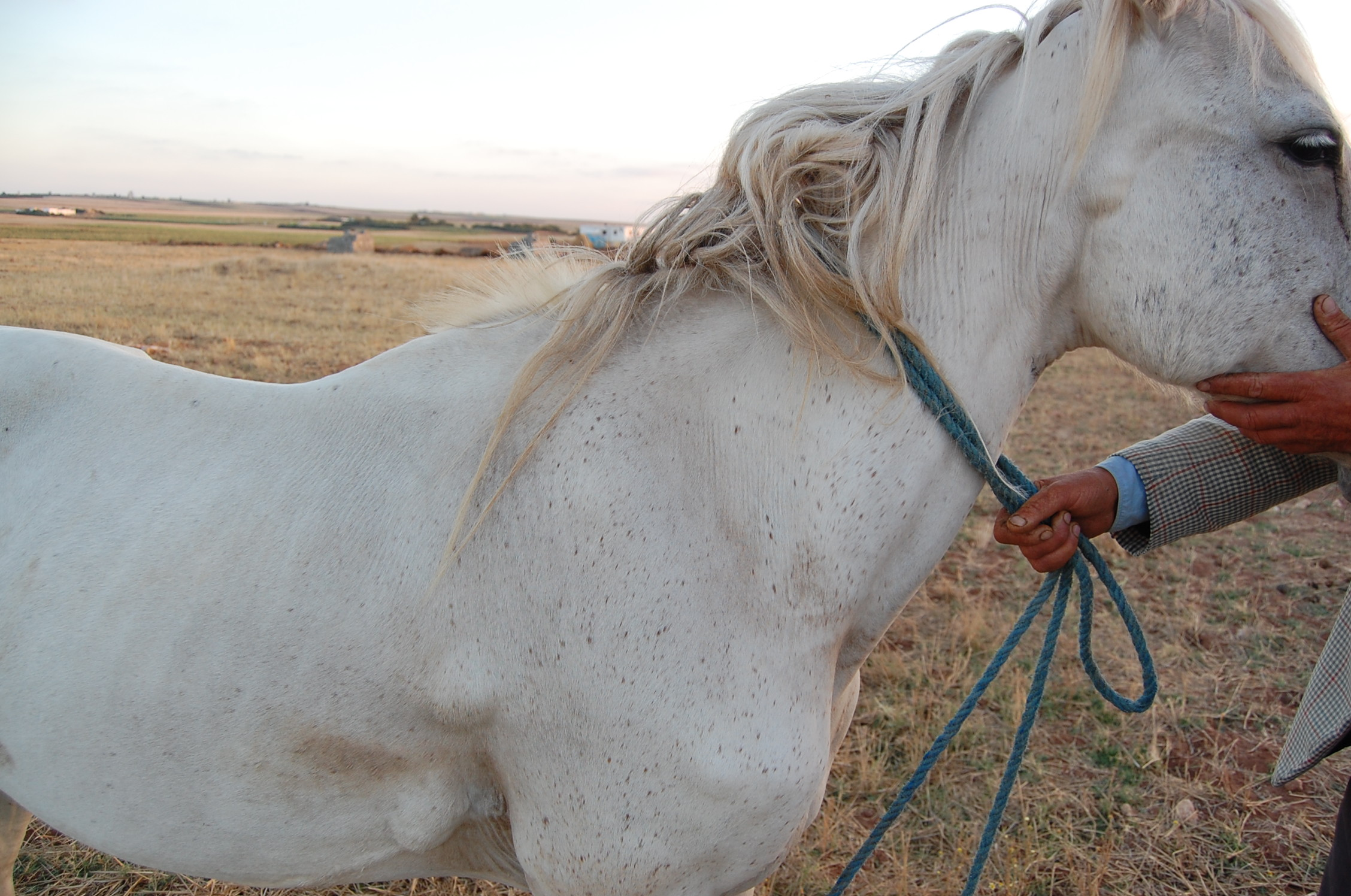
Melanomas on a gray Moroccan Arab-Barb horse.

The coat is indicated as being gray in the Tunisian data on DAD-IS. However, the Delachaux Guide also indicates bay, chestnut with washed mane, and black as possible coat colors, often accompanied by white markings. The Chadian Arab-Barb is said to have a dark coat.

Temperament and Care

The fertility of the breed is reputed to be low, around 30 to 35% according to data from Tunisia. The lactation period for mares lasts an average of 180 days. These horses are known for their hardiness; they are highly economical, especially in terms of feeding.

The morphological differences between populations of Arabian-Barb horses can also be explained by food availability. The coastal plains, with a humid Mediterranean climate, provide abundant vegetation for these animals, while mountainous regions have a subhumid climate with limited food availability. The desert regions of the Sahara have a subarid climate with little food and vulnerability to desertification.

These horses can be parasitized by Toxoplasma gondii. A study conducted in Tunisia showed a higher infestation rate in the southern part of the country compared to the north. In rare cases, Moroccan Arabian-Barb horses can be genetically carriers of severe combined immunodeficiency syndrome (SCID). Genealogical analysis of the affected horses traced back to three Arabian stallions imported to Morocco.

=== Hodh Horse ===
A renowned type of Arabian-Barb or Barb horse is described in colonial sources as the "Hodh horse." It is specific to the Hodh El Chargui region, located in Mauritania and northern Mali, where it is bred by the Mechdoufs. It measures between 1.45m to 1.48m and weighs 325 to 375 kg.

=== Breeding ===
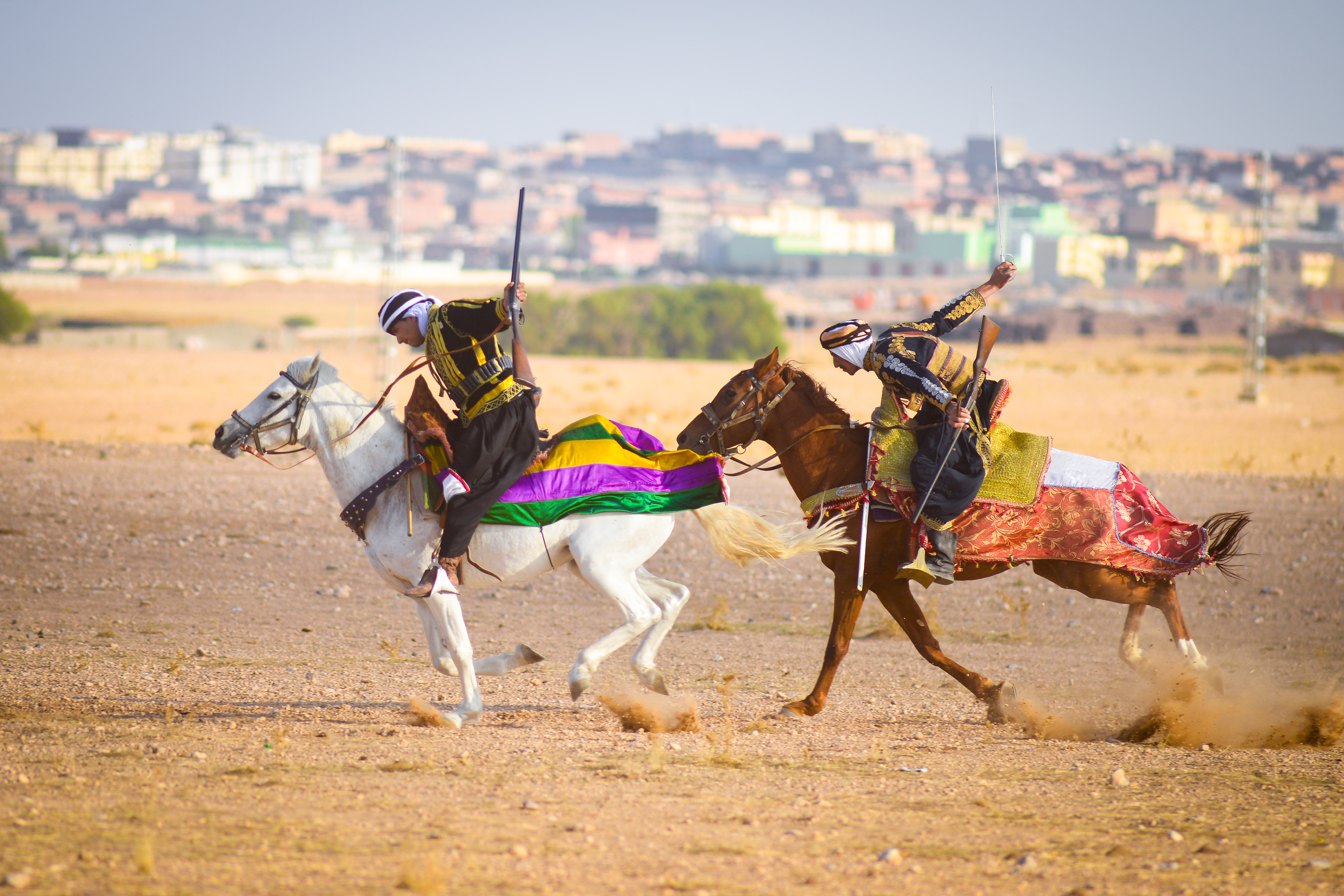
Algerian fantasia horses.

Arabian-Barb horses can be registered with the World Organization of Barb Horses (OMCB). It has been proposed that a horse with Arabian origins ranging from 25% to 75% should be considered a true Arabian-Barb and eligible for initial registration in the Arabian-Barb studbook in countries that are the breed's place of origin. The number of "pure" Arabian-Barb horses registered in the Algerian studbook born between 1993 and 2004 is 3,379. As a result, the majority of Arabian-Barb horses are presumed (without papers) and identified based on their morphology, in the absence of documents revealing their lineage.

There is no official breed standard. Jamali's research indicates a deviation in granting Arabian-Barb papers to fantasia horses that do not exhibit the expected morphological type.

During the OMCB's annual conference held in Tunis in 2013, the following crossbreeds were recognized as Arabian-Barb horses:

- Arabian-Barb x Arabian-Barb
- Arabian-Barb x Arabian Purebred
- Arabian-Barb x Barb
- Barb x Arabian Purebred

=== Genetics ===
The genetic diversity expressed by the breed's heterozygosity is good (according to a study conducted in Morocco and published in 1994), with a short genetic distance between the Barb and Arabian-Barb. The confirmed genetic proximity between the Barb and Arabian-Barb led Jemmali et al. (2017) to classify them within the same gene cluster. This genetic proximity has prompted some researchers (such as Berber et al. in 2014) to consider them as a single horse population.

A study published in Tunisia in 2015 showed that the average number of observed alleles in the Arabian-Barb population is 7.70 (0.613) alleles per locus, indicating a slightly deficient heterozygosity in the Arabian-Barb population.

The Arabian-Barb exhibits rare genetic variants such as Dcfgkm, Ddekl, Es-N, Tf-A, and Pi-W. There is a diversification of polymorphism among Arabian-Barb and Barb horses, unlike Arabian horses.

== Uses ==
These horses, historically used for warfare, are now employed for work and cultural events, particularly in fantasias, where they are ideal. As sturdy riding horses, they can also participate in endurance riding. In Tunisia, everyday rural tasks such as agricultural traction are performed by Barb and Arab-Barb horses from small traditional breeding farms.

A common opinion in the Maghreb region is that the Arab-Barb is suitable for sports, while the Barb is reserved for "chores". Local sources reflect this bias by describing the Barb as a stout and placid horse, and the Arab-Barb as athletic and spirited.

The Arab-Barb is crossed with Thoroughbreds to create a new hybrid called the "Anglo-Arab-Barb". In 1998, Morocco had approximately 2,500 Anglo-Arab-Barb horses in the El Jadida region, where these racehorses were gradually replaced by the Anglo-Arab.

== Breeding Distribution ==
The Arab-Barb is an internationally distributed horse breed. It is common in North Africa, including Morocco, Algeria, Tunisia, Chad, and Mauritania. Chadian horses are primarily bred in the mountainous regions of the country. Present in six African countries, the Arab-Barb is one of the most widely distributed horse breeds on the continent, along with the Barb (and following the Arab and Thoroughbred).

According to a conference given at the El Jadida International Horse Show in October 2010, the estimated total number of Arab-Barb horses throughout the Maghreb region is 185,000. The Arab-Barb is the best-known and most common horse breed in Algeria, Morocco, and Tunisia. In 1992, the recorded population in the Tunisian, Algerian, and Mauritanian DAD-IS database was 32,000, with a declining trend.

According to Mebarki et al. (2018), out of approximately 100,000 horses in Algeria, 90% are Arab-Barb. However, this is only an estimation since there are no documents proving the horses' origin, and the majority of Algerian Arab-Barb horses have less than 25% Arab ancestry.

In 2005, Lahoussine Ouragh estimated the equine population in Morocco to be 160,000 horses, with 90% being Arab-Barb. The Moroccan figures are not provided in DAD-IS. The National Stud of Oujda breeds this breed.

In 1998, according to Serge Farissier, Dr. Ali Bousrih, the former Director-General of the National Foundation for the Improvement of Horse Breeds (FNARC), estimated the number of Tunisian Arab-Barb horses to be nearly 40,000. Jemmali et al. estimate the combined population of Barb and Arab-Barb horses in Tunisia to be around 20,000 in 2015, with the number of Arab-Barb horses alone estimated at 14,000 heads in 2017.

A few Arab-Barb horses can be found in Europe, particularly in Spain, France, and Germany. The European population is much smaller than that of the African continent, with an estimated 1,600 Arab-Barb horses. In 2018, around fifty individuals were recorded in Germany.

== See also ==
- Horses in Morocco
